= List of Iraqi aerial victories during the Iran–Iraq war =

The Iran–Iraq War was an armed conflict between the Islamic Republic of Iran and the Republic of Iraq lasting from September 1980 to August 1988. The following list contains Iraqi victories by known Iraqi pilots. Note the list is far from complete. The confirmed victories are bold and probable victories are italic in the column of victims.

Pilot	Total Number of Kills	Victim aircraft	Victim pilots	Weapons	Date	Fighter type	Notes
Mohommed Rayyan	5	F-5; F-5; F-4D; F-4E; RF-4E	? ? Hosseyn Khalatbari(KiA)/Issa Arousmahalle(Ejected) ? Zolfaghari/Norouzi(KiA)	R-13; R-13; R-40; R-40; R-40	23 Oct 80; 23 Oct 80; 21 Mar 85; 5 Jun 85; 10 Jun 86	MiG-21MF; MiG-25PD	KiA= Killed in Action
S. A. Razak	4	F-5; F-5; F-5; F-5	Hassan Afshin Azar(KiA); Ali Jahanshahloo(KiA) ?(KiA) ?(KiA)	R-13M; R-13M; R-13M; R-13M	23 Sep 80; 23 Sep 80; 20 Oct 80; 20 Oct 80	MiG-21MF	
Ahmad Sabbah	3	F-5; F-5; F-5	Gholam Hosseyn Orouji(?); Massihollah Dinmohammadi(?) ?	AAM; AAM; AAM	23 Sep 80; 23 Sep 80; 26 Sep 80	MiG-23MLA	
Ahmad Salem	3	AH-1J; AH-1J; F-4E	? ? ? (Ejected, fate unknown)	23mm 23mm R.550 Magic	? Oct 82 ? Oct 82; 27 Mar 87	MiG-21MF; MiG-21MF; Mirage F1	
Omar Goben	3	F-5; F-5; F-5	? Abolhassani(KiA) ? (The aircraft damaged)	R-13; R-13M; R-23	12 Oct 80; 26 Nov 80 ? Dec 82	MiG-21MF; MiG-21MF; MiG-23MF	Goben also shot down an Iranian civilian Fokker F-27-600 on 20 February 1986. All 49 crew members and passengers were killed.
Advan Hassan Yassin	3	Helicopter; Helicopter; Helicopter	? ? ?	? ? ?	? ? ?	Mi-25	
Hassan	2	F-4E; F-4E	?(airplane damaged) ?	R-13M; R-13M	23 Sep 80; 23 Sep 80	MiG-21MF	
S. Auda	2	CH-47C; CH-47C	?(Pilots OK) ?	23mm 23mm	26 Feb 84; 27 Feb 84	MiG-21MF; MiG-21bis	
Mansoor	1	Grumman F-14	?	?	? ? 1980	MiG-21	
Riadh Y. Yousef	1	F-4E	Dinmohammadi(KiA)/Nouri Bahadori(KiA)	30 mm	20 Oct 80	Su-20	
Nasser Arkan Abadi	1	F-4D	Bijan Haji(KiA)/Ghodrat Kianjoo(KiA)	23 mm	8 Oct 80	MiG-21MF	
Tariq Al-Dinmaruf	1	F-5	Amir Asadi(?)	23mm	30 Sep 80	Mig-21MF	
Sadiq	1	F-4E	Eskandar(OK)/Rio(KiA)	R-13M	8 Sep 80	MiG-21MF	
Zeki	1	F-4E	?	R.550 Magic	? Dec 80	MiG-21bis	
Nawfal	1	F-5	Abdolhassani(KiA)	R-60	26 Nov 80	MiG-21bis	
Mokhalad Abdulkareem	1	F-4E	?(airplane damaged)	R.550 Magic	4 Dec 81	Mirage F1	
Faiq	1	AH-1	?	23mm	? Oct 80	MiG-23MS	
? (Unit 39FS)	1	F-4D	(KiA)	23 mm (GSh-23L)	5/7 October 80	MiG-23MS	
? (Unit 63FS)	1	F-14A	(KiA)	R-60MK	11 August 84	MiG-23ML	
? (Unit 63FS)	1	F-14A	(KiA)	? (missile)	17 January 87	MiG-25PDS	
Ali Sabah	1	F-14	Gholamreza Nezamabadi(Ejected)	Super 530D	19 Jul 88	Mirage F1	
