= RP-23 Sapfir =

Type of aircraft radar system

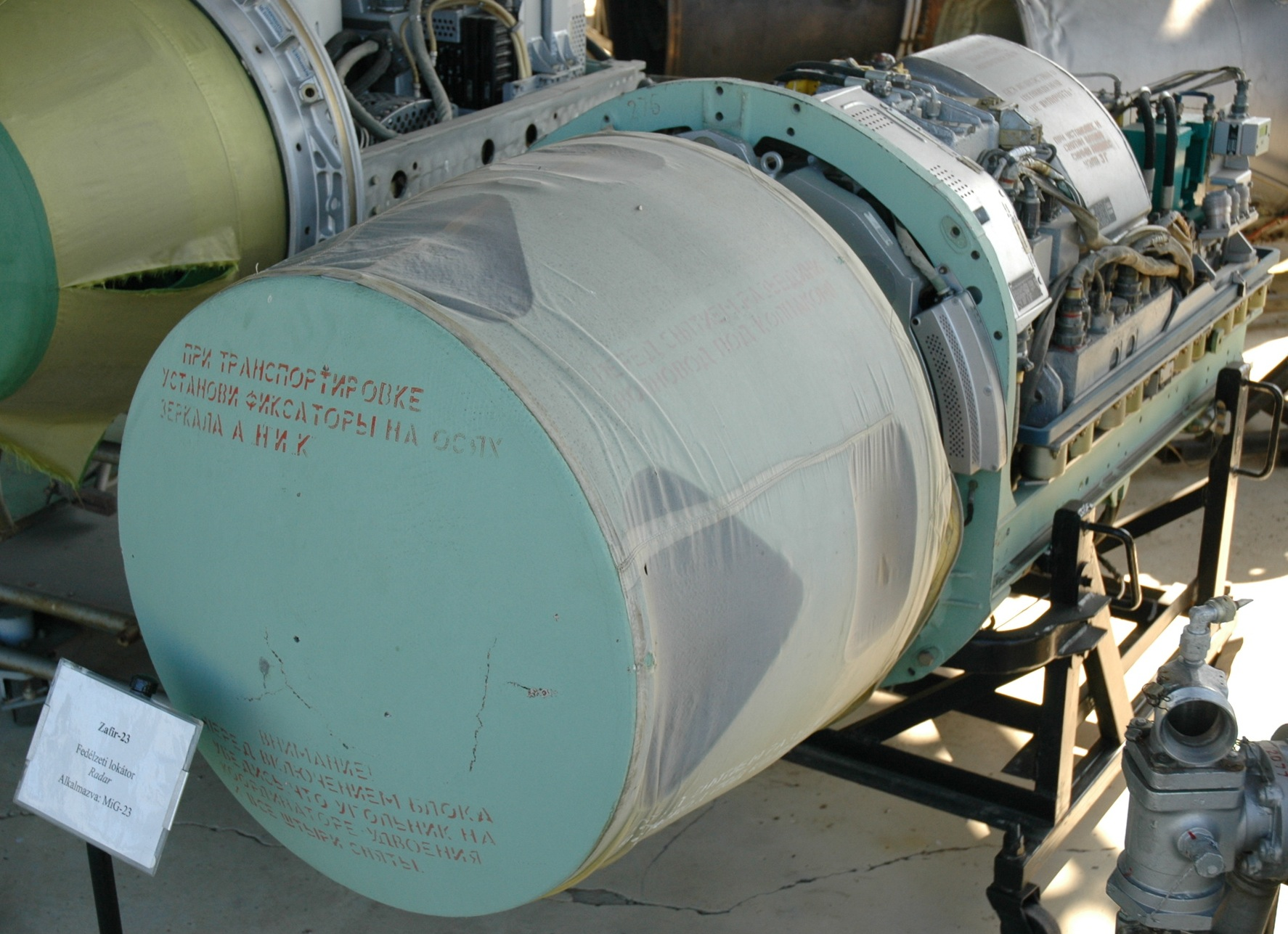
Front view of RP-23 Sapfir-23 radar (used on MiG-23), displayed at the Hungarian Aviation Museum, Szolnok

The RP-23 Sapfir (NATO codename: High Lark) was a Soviet look-down/shoot-down radar system. It was developed by Phazotron specifically for the Soviet Air Forces (VVS) new MiG-23 fighter aircraft and used in conjunction with the Vympel R-23 (NATO codename: AA-7 Apex) beyond visual range air-to-air missile.

== Variants ==
Sapfir-23L

The initial production version, the Sapfir-23L (L - Lyogkiy or lightweight) pulse radar was first carried on the MiG-23 Edition 1971. Using a twist-Cassegrain antenna 800 mm (31 in) in diameter, it used a continuous-wave target illuminator channel to provide guidance for the semi-active radar homing (SARH) R-23R missile. However, as an interim variant it was considered unreliable and lacked the look-down/shoot-down capability of later Sapfir radars; it could only guide missiles onto targets flying above 1,000 m (3,300 ft).

Sapfir-23D

Equipping the MiG-23M, the improved Sapfir-23D had look-down/shoot-down capability and could guide both R-23R and R-23T missiles. It was not a true Doppler radar but used the less effective "envelope detection" technique common to Western radars of the 1960s. The Sapfir-23D had a detection range of approximately 45km against a high-flying, fighter-sized target. All Sapfir-23Ds were eventually updated to the definitive Sapfir-23D-III during field upgrades.

Sapfir-23D-III

The definitive version of the first-generation Sapfir-23s, all MiG-23Ms were fitted with the Sapfir-23D-III starting in 1975. Working in the 3cm wavelength and with a carrier frequency of about 9 GHz, it had a detection range of about 45km against a high-altitude fighter-sized aircraft during a head-on engagement, and between 10 and 20km in look-down mode during a tail-chase engagement. Against bomber-size targets these ranges were 55km and 15 to 20km respectively. However, in look-down/shoot-down mode targets flying slower than 60 km/h (37 mph) would not be detected.

Sapfir-23E

A re-designation of the Sapfir-23D-III carried on the export-specific MiG-23MF. Those which were sold to Third World clients had downgraded performance and lacked electronic counter-countermeasures (ECCM).

Sapfir-23ML (N003)

Equipping the newer MiG-23ML, the Sapfir-23ML was an improvement upon the Sapfir-23D-III, being more reliable and with superior look-down/shoot-down capability. It had a maximum detection range of 65km against a fighter-sized target at high altitude, reduced to 25km in look-down mode.

Sapfir-23MLA (N003)

An improved version of the Sapfir-23ML with better range, reliability, ECCM and the capability to guide the updated R-24R/T air-to-air missiles. It also had a frequency spacing feature that prevented multiple radars from interfering with each other's operation, allowing for group-search patterns to be conducted.

Sapfir-23MLAE (N003E)

A downgraded version of the N003 carried on MiG-23MLDs exported to Syria. It was also carried on export versions of the MiG-23ML. The N003E had no ability to detect or track targets in a tail-chase engagement, relying on the fighter's IRST instead. It's field of scan was +/- 30° to either side of the fighter's nose and +/- 6° in elevation.

Sapfir-23MLA-II (N008)

The ultimate version of the RP-23, the N008 was carried on the MiG-23MLD used by the VVS. Weighing 360 kg (790 lb), it had an average emitting power of 1 kW and peak output of 60 kW. It featured improved detection range, reliability, ECCM, look-down/shoot-down over rough terrain, and a close air combat mode with vertical-scan capability. Search range against high-altitude targets was 75km for a bomber-sized target and 52km for a fighter-sized target; in look-down mode it was 23km for both target types, except for fighter-sized targets in a head-on engagements in which case it was 14km. Tracking range against high-altitude targets was 52km for bomber-sized and 39km for fighter-sized targets; in look-down mode it was 23km for bombers, while for fighter-sized targets it was 15km in tail-chase or 9km in head-on engagements. The scan field was limited to 60° x 6°, although it could be steered up to 60° left and right to expand the search area.

Sapfir-23P (N006)

This derivative of the Sapfir-23ML was designed specifically for the MiG-23P interceptor, although initial models were unreliable and required additional maintenance. It had slightly improved look-down/shoot-down, including against cruise missiles.

== Bibliography ==
- Cooper, Tom; Dildy, Douglas (2016). F-15C Eagle Vs MiG-23/25: Iraq 1991. London: Osprey Publishing. ISBN 9781472812711.
- Mladenov, Alexander (2016). Soviet Cold War Fighters. United Kingdom: Fonthill Media. ISBN 9781781554968.
- Vasconcelos, Miguel (2013). Civil Airworthiness Certification: Former Military High-Performance Aircraft. Stickshaker Pubs.
