= Mikoyan-Gurevich MiG-25 =

Family of interceptor and reconnaissance aircraft

MiG-25
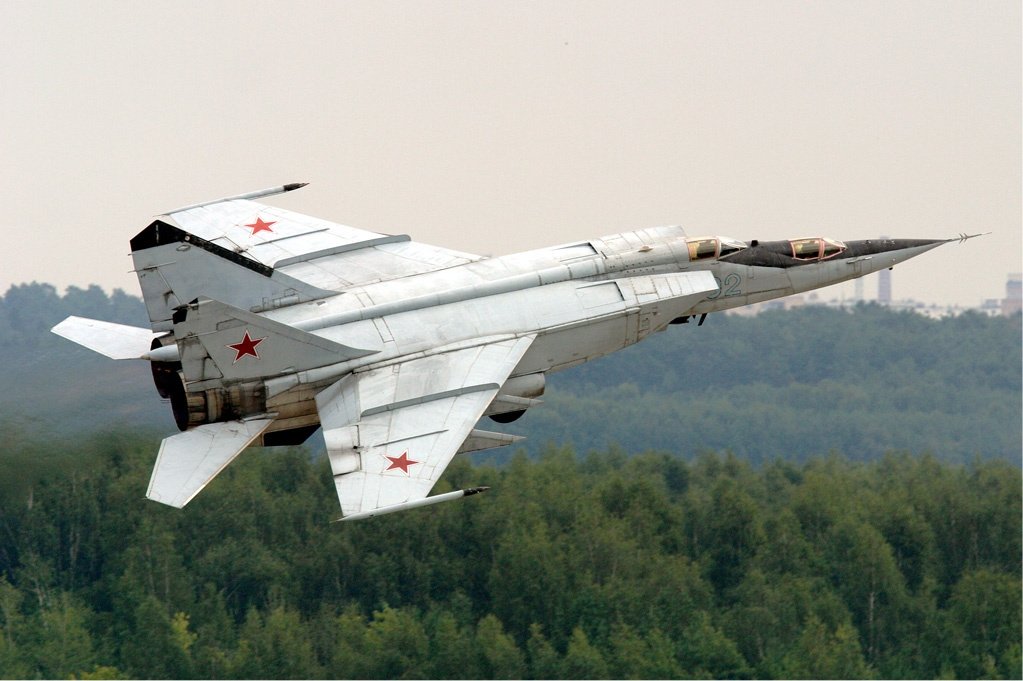
- A MiG-25PU two-seat trainer

General information
- Type: Interceptor and reconnaissance aircraft
- National origin: Soviet Union
- Manufacturer: Mikoyan-Gurevich / Mikoyan
- Status: Retired
- Primary users: Soviet Air Defence Forces (historical): Iraqi Air Force (historical); Indian Air Force (historical); Algerian Air Force (historical)
- Number built: 1,186

History
- Manufactured: 1964–1984
- Introduction date: 1970
- First flight: 6 March 1964; 62 years ago
- Developed into: Mikoyan MiG-31

The Mikoyan-Gurevich MiG-25 (Russian: Микоян и Гуревич МиГ-25; NATO reporting name: Foxbat) is a supersonic interceptor and reconnaissance aircraft that is among the fastest military aircraft to enter service. Designed by the Soviet Union's Mikoyan-Gurevich bureau, it is an aircraft built primarily using a nickel-steel alloy. It was the last aircraft designed by Mikhail Gurevich before his retirement.

The first prototype flew in 1964 and the aircraft entered service in 1970. Although it was capable of reaching speeds exceeding Mach 3.2 (3,445 km/h (2,141 mph)) this would result in the engines accelerating out of control and needing replacement. Therefore, the operational top speed was limited to Mach 2.83 (2,743.2 km/h (1,704.5 mph)). The MiG-25 features a powerful radar and four air-to-air missiles, and it still holds the world record for altitude reached by airbreathing piloted aircraft of 38 km (125,000 ft).

Production of the MiG-25 series ended in 1984 after completion of 1,186 aircraft. A symbol of the Cold War, the MiG-25 flew with Soviet allies and former Soviet republics, remaining in limited service in several export customers. It is one of the highest-flying military aircraft, the fastest serially produced interceptor aircraft, and the second-fastest serially produced aircraft after the SR-71 reconnaissance aircraft, which was built in very small numbers compared to the MiG-25. As of 2018, the MiG-25 remained the fastest manned serially produced aircraft in operational use and the fastest plane that was offered for supersonic flights and edge-of-space flights to civilian customers.

== Design and development ==
=== Background ===
During the Cold War, Soviet Air Defence Forces, PVO (not to be confused with Soviet Air Force, VVS) was given the task of strategic air defence of the USSR. This meant not only dealing with accidental border violations but more importantly defending the vast airspace of the USSR against US reconnaissance aircraft and strategic bombers carrying free-fall nuclear bombs. The performance of these types of aircraft was steadily improved. In the late 1950s, the very high altitude overflights of Soviet territory by the Lockheed U-2 revealed the need for a higher altitude interceptor aircraft than available at that time.

In addition, the subsonic Boeing B-47 Stratojet and Boeing B-52 Stratofortress strategic bombers were followed by the Mach 2 Convair B-58 Hustler, with the Mach 3 North American B-70 Valkyrie being developed at that time. A major upgrade in the PVO defence system was required in order to meet the higher and faster American strategic bombers. At the start of 1958, a requirement was issued for manned interceptors capable of reaching 3,000 km/h (1,600 kn) and heights of up to 27 km (89,000 ft). Mikoyan and Sukhoi responded.

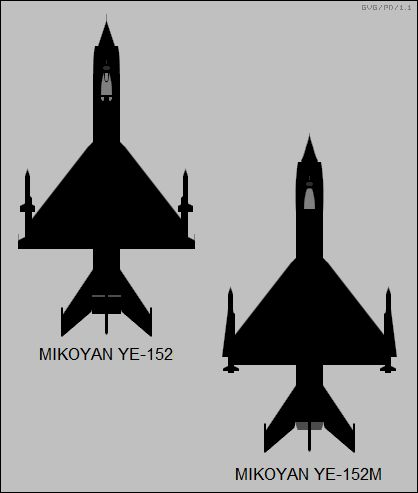
YE-152 and YE-152M experimental interceptor

The Mikoyan-Gurevich OKB had been working on a series of interceptors during the second half of the 1950s: the I-1, I-3U, I-7U, I-75, Ye-150, Ye-150A, Ye-152, Ye-152A, Ye-152P, and Ye-152M. The Ye-150 was noteworthy because it was built specifically to test the Tumansky R-15 engine, two of which would later be used for the MiG-25. This led to Ye-152, alternatively known as Ye-166, which set several world records. The Ye-152M (converted from one of the two Ye-152 aircraft) was intended to be the definite heavy interceptor design. But before it was finished, the PVO had selected the Tupolev Tu-128. As the work on the MiG-25 was well under way, the single-engine Ye-152M was abandoned.

=== Development ===
Work on the new Soviet interceptor that became the MiG-25 started in mid-1959, a year before Soviet intelligence learned of the American Mach 3 A-12 reconnaissance aircraft. It is not clear if the design was influenced by the American XF-108 Rapier and the A-5 Vigilante.

The design bureau studied several possible layouts for the new aircraft. One had the engines located side by side, as on the MiG-19. The second had a stepped arrangement with one engine amidships, with exhaust under the fuselage, and another in the aft fuselage. The third project had an engine arrangement similar to that of the English Electric Lightning, with two engines stacked vertically. Options two and three were both rejected because the size of the engines meant that either of them would result in a very tall aircraft, which would complicate maintenance.

The idea of placing the engines in underwing nacelles was also rejected because of the dangers of any thrust asymmetry during flight. Having decided on engine configuration, there was thought of giving the machine variable-sweep wings and a second crew member, a navigator. Variable geometry would improve manoeuvrability at subsonic speed, but at the cost of decreased fuel tank capacity. Because the reconnaissance aircraft would operate at high speed and high altitude, the idea was soon dropped. Another interesting but impractical idea was to improve the field performance using two RD36-35 lift-jets. Vertical takeoff and landing would allow for use of damaged runways during wartime and was studied on both sides of the Iron Curtain. The perennial problem with engines dedicated to vertical lift is they become mere dead weight in horizontal flight and also occupy space in the airframe needed for fuel. The MiG interceptor would need all the fuel it could get, so the idea was abandoned.

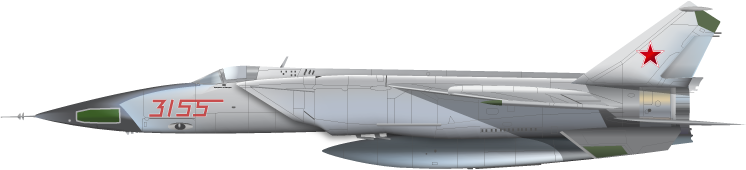
Ye-155R3 Reconnaissance prototype with a 5,280 L (1,390 US gal) drop tank under the belly, 1964

The first prototype was a reconnaissance variant, designated Ye-155-R1, that made its first flight on 6 March 1964. It had some characteristics that were unique to that prototype, and some of these were visually very evident: the wings had fixed wingtip tanks with a 600 L (160 US gal) capacity, to which small winglets were attached for stability purposes, but when it was found that fuel sloshing around in the tanks caused vibrations, they were eliminated. The aircraft also had attachments for movable foreplanes, canards, to help with pitch control at high speed (provisions for canards had previously been installed, but not used, on the Ye-152P).

The first flight of the interceptor prototype, Ye-155-P1, took place on 9 September 1964. Development of the MiG-25, which represented a major step forward in Soviet aerodynamics, engineering and metallurgy, took several more years to complete.

On 9 July 1967, the new aircraft was first shown to the public at the Domodedovo air show, with four prototypes (three fighters and a reconnaissance aircraft) making a flypast.

==== Aviation records ====
The Mikoyan-Gurevich design bureau soon realized that the performance of the new aircraft gave it great potential to set new flight records. In addition to their normal duties, the prototypes Ye-155-P1, Ye-155-R1, Ye-155-R3 were made lighter by removing some unneeded equipment and were used for these attempts. Under Federation Aeronautique Internationale (FAI) classification, the Ye-155 type belonged to class C1 (III), which specifies jet-powered land planes with unlimited maximum take-off weight. Records set included:

- The first claim was for world speed records with no payload and payloads of 1,000 and 2,000 kilograms (2,205 and 4,409 lb). MiG OKB Chief Test Pilot Aleksandr Vasilyevich Fedotov reached an average speed of 2,319.12 km/h (1,252.22 kn) over a 1,000 km (621.4 mi) circuit on 16 March 1965.
- For pure speed, with no payload, test pilot Mikhail M. Komarov averaged 2,981.5 km/h (1,609.9 kn) over a 500 km (311 mi) closed circuit on 5 October 1967. On the same day, Fedotov reached an altitude of 29,977 metres (98,350 ft) with a 1,000 kilograms (2,205 lb) payload. The MiG eventually became the first aircraft to go higher than 35,000 metres (115,000 ft).
- Time to height records were recorded on 4 June 1973 when Boris A. Orlov climbed to 20,000 m (65,617 ft) in 2 min 49.8 s. The same day, Pyotr M. Ostapenko reached 25,000 m (82,021 ft) in 3 min 12.6 s and 30,000 m (98,425 ft) in 4 min 3.86 s.
- On 25 July 1973, Fedotov reached 35,230 m (115,584 ft) with 1,000 kg (2,205 lb) payload and 36,240 m (118,900 ft) with no load (an absolute world record). In the thin air, the engines flamed out, and the aircraft coasted in a ballistic trajectory by inertia alone. At the apex the speed had dropped to 75 km/h (40 kn).
- On 31 August 1977, Ye-266M again flown by Fedotov, set the recognized absolute altitude record for a jet aircraft under its own power. He reached 37,650 metres (123,520 ft) at Podmoskovnoye, USSR in zoom climb (the absolute altitude record is different from the record for sustained altitude in horizontal flight). The aircraft was actually a MiG-25RB re-engined with the powerful R-15BF2-300. It had earlier been part of the program to improve the aircraft's top speed that resulted in the MiG-25M prototype.

In all, 29 records were claimed, of which seven were all-time world records for time to altitudes of 20,000 m (66,000 ft) and higher, and speed. Several records still stand.

==== Technical description ====
Because of the thermal stresses incurred in flight above Mach 2, the Mikoyan-Gurevich OKB had difficulties choosing what materials to use for the aircraft. They had to use E-2 heat-resistant Plexiglas for the canopy and high-strength stainless steel for the wings and fuselage. Using titanium rather than steel would have been ideal, but it was expensive and difficult to work with. The problem of cracks in welded titanium structures with thin walls could not be solved, so the heavier nickel steel was used instead. It cost far less than titanium and allowed for welding, along with heat-resistant seals. The MiG-25 was constructed from 80% nickel-steel alloy, 11% aluminium, and 9% titanium. The steel components were formed by a combination of spot welding, automatic machine welding, and hand arc welding methods.

Initially, the interceptor version was equipped with the TL-25 Smerch-A (also referred to as Product 720) radar, a development of the system carried by the earlier Tu-128. While powerful and thus long-ranged and resistant to jamming, the system—due to the age of its design and its intended purpose (tracking and targeting high- and fast-flying US bombers and reconnaissance aircraft)—lacked look-down/shoot-down capability, which limited its effectiveness against low-flying targets. (This is one of the reasons why it was replaced with the MiG-31, whose Zaslon radar has that capability.) By the time the MiG-25 entered service in 1969, this was a serious shortcoming, as strategic bombing doctrine was shifting towards low-level penetration of enemy territory. After Belenko's defection to Japan exposed this flaw to the West, a government decree issued on 4 November 1976 urgently called for a more advanced radar. To speed up development, the existing RP-23 Sapfir of the MiG-23 was repurposed, with the use of a larger antenna. The renamed Sapfir-25 gave the new MiG-25PD variant improved jamming resistance and look-down/shoot-down capability.

As an interceptor, typical armament includes four R-40 long-range air-to-air missiles, each fitted with either an infrared seeker (R-40T/TD) or a semi-active radar homing seeker (R-40R/RD) and a maximum range of 35–60 km (22–37 mi) against a high-flying target on a collision course. A fuel tank could be suspended under the fuselage. The aircraft could carry unguided gravity bombs to fulfill a rudimentary strike role by using a delivery system developed for nuclear weapons. As the bombs would weigh no more and incur no more drag than its regular load of R-40 missiles, its performance was not impaired, leading to some impressive bombing feats; when released at an altitude of 20,000 m (66,000 ft) and a speed above Mach 2, a 500 kg (1,100 lb) bomb would have a range of several tens of kilometres.

The MiG-25 was theoretically capable of a maximum speed exceeding Mach 3 and a ceiling of 27 km (89,000 ft). Its high speed was problematic: Although sufficient thrust was available to reach Mach 3.2, a limit of Mach 2.83 had to be imposed as the engines tended to overspeed and overheat at higher airspeeds, possibly damaging them beyond repair.

The design cruising speed is Mach 2.35 (2,500 km/h) with partial afterburner in operation. The maximum speed of Mach 2.83 (3,000 km/h) is allowed for no more than 5 minutes due to the danger of overheating the airframe and fuel. When the airframe temperature reaches 290 °C (554 °F), a warning lamp lights up, and the pilot must reduce airspeed. The use of a partial afterburner and a cruising flight altitude 19,000–21,000 m (62,000–69,000 ft) makes it possible to have a range of only 230 km (140 mi) less than when flying at Mach 0.9 at altitudes of 9,000–10,000 m (30,000–33,000 ft). The maximum altitude of flight without an afterburner in operation is 12,000 m (39,000 ft). The poor fuel consumption in the subsonic regime, and hence range, is due to the engines having an extremely low pressure ratio of just 4.75 at subsonic speeds. The specific fuel consumption (SFC) of the engines is 1.12lb/(h·lbf) in cruise and 2.45lb/(h·lbf) with afterburners. For comparison purposes, this is 50% worse in cruise than the first generation of F100 engines from the F-15 Eagle, but the SFC with afterburners is actually nearly equal, though the F100 is a far newer engine design.

=== Production ===
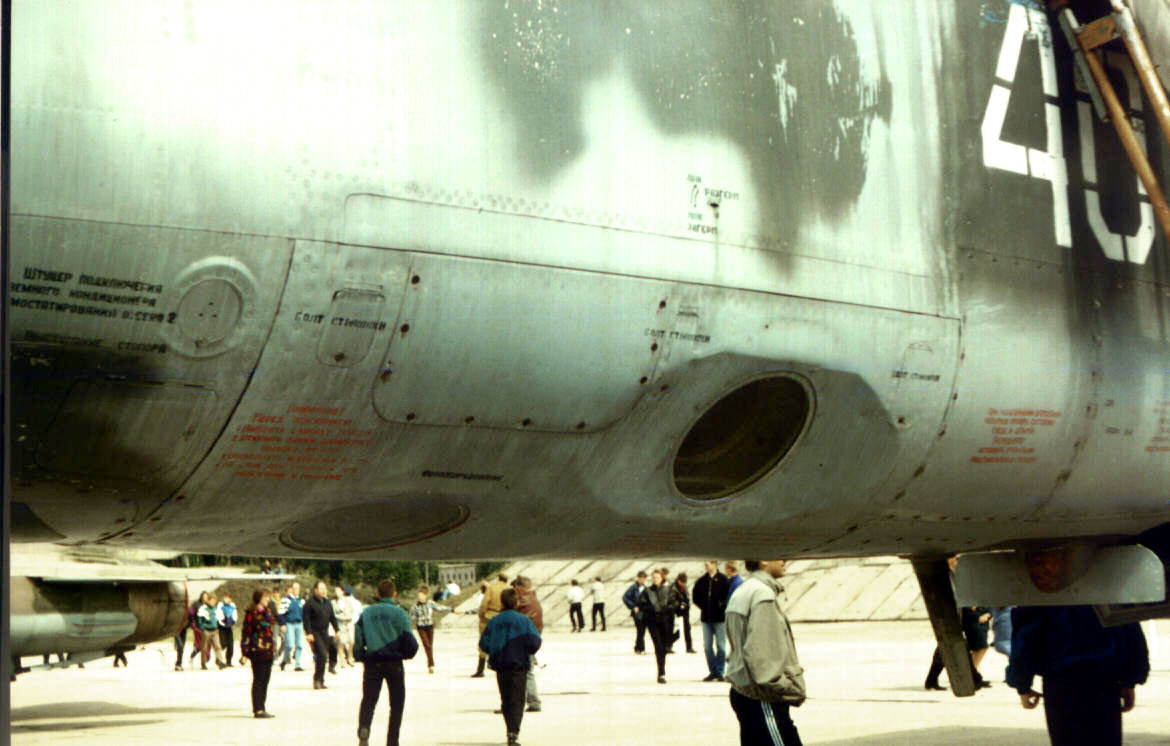
Surveillance cameras of the MiG-25RB

Full-scale production of the MiG-25R ("Foxbat-B") began in 1969 at the Gorkii aircraft factory (Plant No. 21). The MiG-25P ("Foxbat-A") followed in 1971, and 460 of this variant were built until production ended in 1982. The improved PD variant that replaced it was built from 1978 to 1984, with 104 aircraft completed. Subsequently, the Gorkii factory switched production to the new MiG-31.

=== Western intelligence and the MiG-25 ===
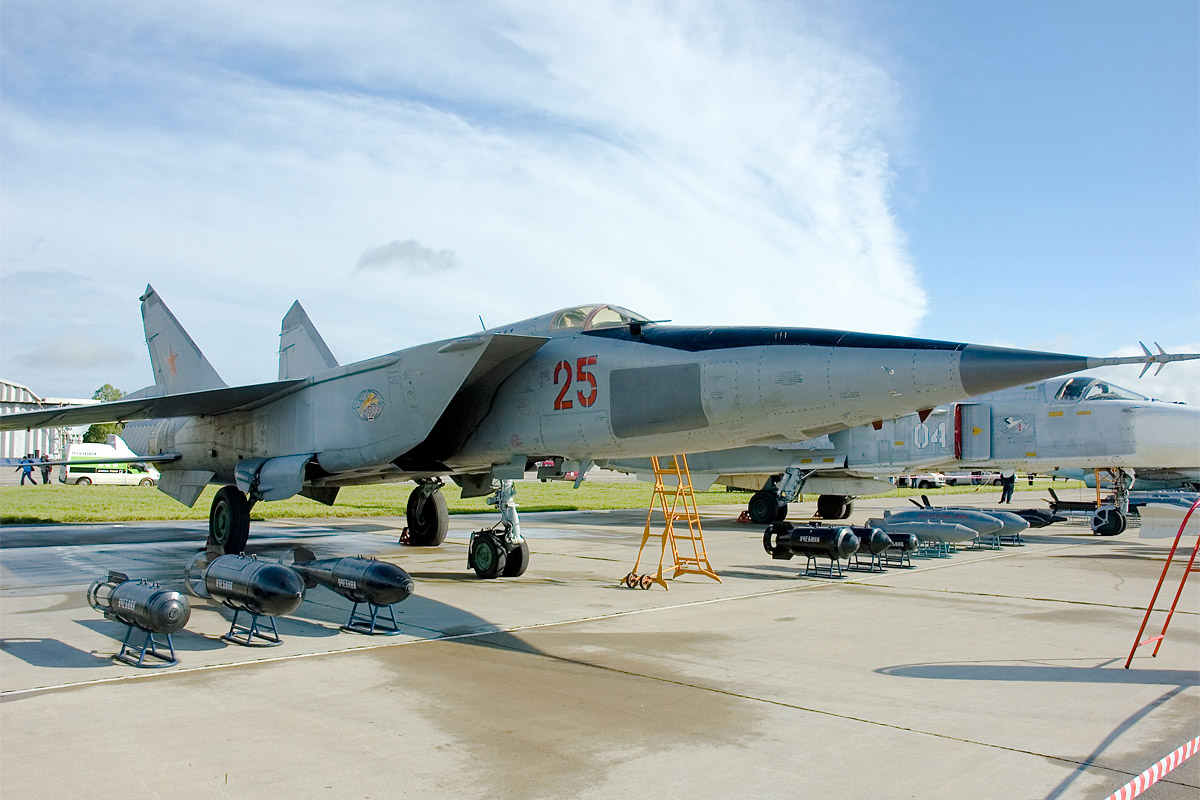
MiG-25RBSh with markings of 2nd Sqn/47th GvORAP (Guards independent recce Regiment)

Western intelligence first encountered the MiG-25 at the Moscow air show on 8 and 9 July 1967, where it was assessed as a fighter-bomber and all-weather interceptor capable of speeds in excess of Mach 2.5. It was not believed at that time to have been in series production.

NATO obtained a better understanding of the MiG-25's capabilities on 6 September 1976, when a Soviet Air Defence Forces pilot, Lt. Viktor Belenko, defected, landing his MiG-25P at Hakodate Airport in Japan. The pilot overshot the runway on landing and damaged the front landing gear. Despite Soviet protests, the Japanese invited U.S. Air Force personnel to investigate the aircraft. On 25 September, it was moved by a C-5A transport to a base in central Japan, where it was carefully dismantled and analyzed. After 67 days, the aircraft was returned by ship to the Soviets, in pieces. The aircraft was reassembled and is now on display at the Sokol plant in Nizhny Novgorod.

The analysis, based on technical manuals and ground tests of its engines and avionics, revealed unusual technical information:

- Belenko's particular aircraft was brand new, representing the latest Soviet technology.
- The aircraft was assembled quickly and was essentially built around its massive Tumansky R-15(B) turbojets.
- Welding was done by hand. Rivets with non-flush heads were used in areas that would not cause adverse aerodynamic drag.
- The aircraft was built of a nickel-steel alloy and not titanium, as was assumed (although some titanium was used in heat-critical areas). The steel construction contributed to the craft's high 29,000 kg (64,000 lb) unarmed weight.
- Maximum acceleration (g-load) rating was just 2.2 g (21.6 m/s^{2}) with full fuel tanks, with an absolute limit of 4.5 g (44.1 m/s^{2}). One MiG-25 withstood an inadvertent 11.5 g (112.8 m/s^{2}) pull during low-altitude dogfight training, but the resulting deformation damaged the airframe beyond repair.
- Combat radius was 300 kilometres (186 mi), and maximum range on internal fuel (at subsonic speeds) was only 1,197 kilometres (744 mi) at low altitude, less than 1,000 m (3,300 ft).
- The airspeed indicator was redlined at Mach 2.8, with typical intercept speeds near Mach 2.5 in order to extend the service life of the engines. A MiG-25 was tracked flying over the Sinai Peninsula at Mach 3.2 in the early 1970s, but the flight caused the engines to be damaged beyond repair.
- The majority of the on-board avionics were based on vacuum tube technology, more specifically nuvistors, not solid-state electronics. Although they represented aging technology, vacuum tubes were more tolerant of temperature extremes, thereby removing the need for environmental controls in the avionics bays. With the use of vacuum tubes, the MiG-25P's original Smerch-A (Tornado, NATO reporting name "Foxfire") radar had enormous power, about 600 kilowatts. As with most Soviet aircraft, the MiG-25 was designed to be as robust as possible. Use of nuvistors was speculated to be part of an effort to harden the aircraft against electromagnetic pulse, but it may simply have been due to lower adoption of semiconductor technology in the Soviet Union.

=== Later versions ===
As the result of Belenko's defection and the compromise of the MiG-25P's radar and missile systems, beginning in 1976, the Soviets developed an updated version with a new fire control system, the MiG-25PD ("Foxbat-E"). The MiG-25PD replaced the Smerch-A radar of the MiG-25P with the Saphir-25, based on the MiG-23's Saphir-23, supplemented by an Infrared search and track (IRST) system. The ability to carry R-60 air-to-air missiles was added. A total of 104 MiG-25PDs were built from 1978 to 1984, while existing MiG-25Ps were modified to a similar standard to the PD as the MiG-25PDS.

Work was also carried out to improve the MiG-25's performance, with a revised version of the R15 engine, the R15BF2-300, designed with an extra compression stage and running at higher temperatures to give greater power and better fuel consumption. A MiG-25P was fitted with the new engines, with testing of the modified aircraft, unofficially known as the MiG-25M (Ye-155M) beginning in 1974. Planned production aircraft would have received improved radar and armament, but production orders never followed, as the coming MiG-31 showed more promise. Three MiG-25RB reconnaissance/strike aircraft were also modified with the R15BF2-300, which were used to set a series of time-to-height world records (under the designation Ye-266M) on 17 May 1975, and two altitude world records in 1977.

== Operational history ==
=== Soviet Union ===
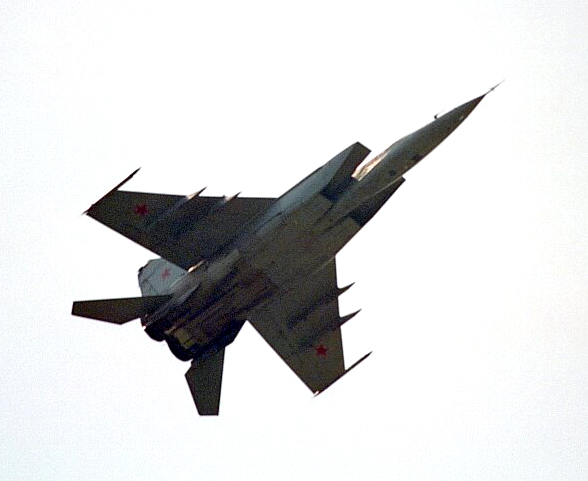
MiG-25PU

The unarmed "B" version had greater impact than the interceptor when the USSR sent two MiG-25R and two MiG-25RB to Egypt in March 1971, which stayed until July 1972. They were operated by the Soviet 63rd Independent Air Detachment (Det 63), which was established for this mission. Det 63 flew over Israeli-held territory in Sinai on reconnaissance missions roughly 20 times. The flights were in pairs at maximum speed and high altitude, between 17,000 and 23,000 m (56,000 and 75,000 ft). On 6 November 1971, a Soviet MiG-25 operating out of Egypt flying at Mach 2.5 was met by Israeli F-4Es and fired upon unsuccessfully. A MiG-25 was tracked flying over Sinai at Mach 3.2 during this period. The MiG-25 engines went into overspeed, which caused them to be scrapped. Det 63 was sent back home in 1972. Soviet-operated reconnaissance Foxbats returned to Egypt in 19–20 October 1973, during the Yom Kippur War. Det 154 remained in Egypt until late 1974.

During the 1970s, the Soviet air force conducted reconnaissance overflights across Iran using its MiG-25RBSh aircraft in response to joint U.S.–Iran reconnaissance operations.

The Swedish Air Force observed Soviet Air Defence MiG-25s via radar regularly performing intercepts at 19,000 m (62,000 ft) and 2.9 km (1.8 mi) behind the Lockheed SR-71 Blackbird at 22,000 m (72,000 ft) over the Baltic Sea in the 1980s.

=== Algeria ===
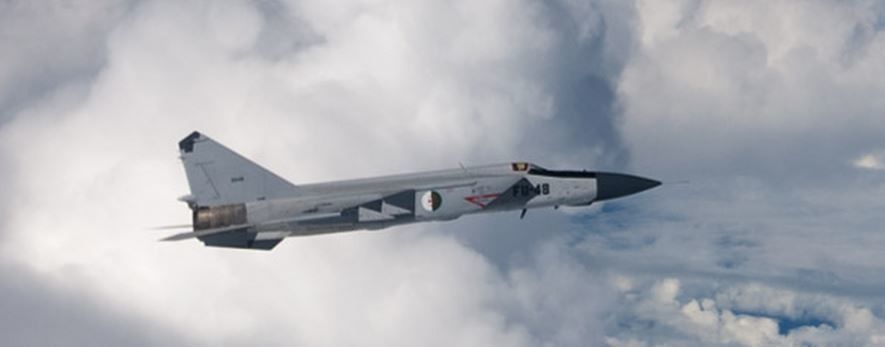
Algerian MIG-25PDS of the Algerian Air Force

Algeria was the first foreign operator of the MiG‑25, acquiring the aircraft in the late 1970s and early 1980s. The initial deliveries included reconnaissance variants (MiG‑25R/RB), followed later by interceptor variants (MiG‑25P/PD).

During the Western Sahara conflict, Algeria supported the Polisario Front, while Morocco controlled and fortified some of the sahrawi-claimed territory. According to declassified CIA intelligence assessments, Morocco lacked the capability to intercept high‑altitude, high‑speed MiG‑25 aircraft, and Algerian MiG‑25s conducted overflight missions over Western Sahara and even into Moroccan airspace during this period. The CIA documents specifically noted that "Morocco has no capability to interdict high altitude, high speed MiG‑25 aircraft such as the two Algerian MiG‑25s which last year overflew...", emphasizing that Moroccan air defenses were unable to counter these flights. These operations were interpreted by U.S. intelligence analysts as both reconnaissance and a signal of Algeria's regional military advantage, given the Algerian MiG‑25's unmatched speed and altitude.

On one occasion, Algerian MiG‑25s reportedly conducted long-range reconnaissance flights in which the aircraft would fly north at high speed from their base at Ain Ouessara, veer west over the Mediterranean, cross Andalusia, and then traverse Morocco from north to south before returning to Tindouf. These flights alarmed multiple regional air defense systems, which were unable to respond to the MiG‑25's extreme speed and altitude. The overflights were said to have prompted Spain to urgently acquire F‑18 Hornets and an Aegis-equipped frigate.

Algeria officially retired their MiG-25s from frontline service in July 2022, though a few are still flyable and were used in parades. They were likely the last MiG-25s in service (with the possible exception of Syria) and they were replaced with the recent purchase of Su-57s. As of June 2026, Algeria has reportedly maintained an unspecified number of MiG-25s in airworthy condition to supplement its newly-acquired Su-57s in the aerial reconnaissance role.

=== Syria ===
Syria ordered its MiG-25s in April 1978 as a primary customer of Soviet arms exports, and put 30 MiG-25PD interceptors, 5 MiG-25 PUs and 8 MiG-25RBs into operation by 1981. On 13 February 1981, the Israeli Air Force sent two RF-4Es over Lebanon as decoys for Syrian MiG-25 interceptors. As the MiGs scrambled, the RF-4Es turned back delivering chaff and using ECM pods. Two IDF/AF F-15As were waiting for the MiGs and shot one of them down with AIM-7F Sparrow missiles. The other MiG was able to escape. In a similar engagement, on 29 July 1981, a Syrian MiG-25 was again downed by an Israeli F-15A, after which a second MiG-25 launched its R-40 missiles at the F-15 and its wingman, but they missed. A third MiG-25 was downed by IAF F-15As; this time a MiG-25RB by a F-15 of the 133 Fighter Squadron (as with the previous two engagements) on the 31st of August 1982.

By 2011, most of the Syrian fleet (around twenty-eight out of an estimated forty) was withdrawn from service, possibly due their vulnerability to Israeli jamming. During the Syrian Civil War, the MiG-25 saw limited action against rebel forces in 2012 and 2014, armed with R-40 missiles or FAB-500T unguided bombs. After the fall of the Assad regime in 2024, the IAF conducted airstrikes destroying the remaining Syrian Air Force assets to prevent them from falling into the rebels hands.

=== Iraq ===
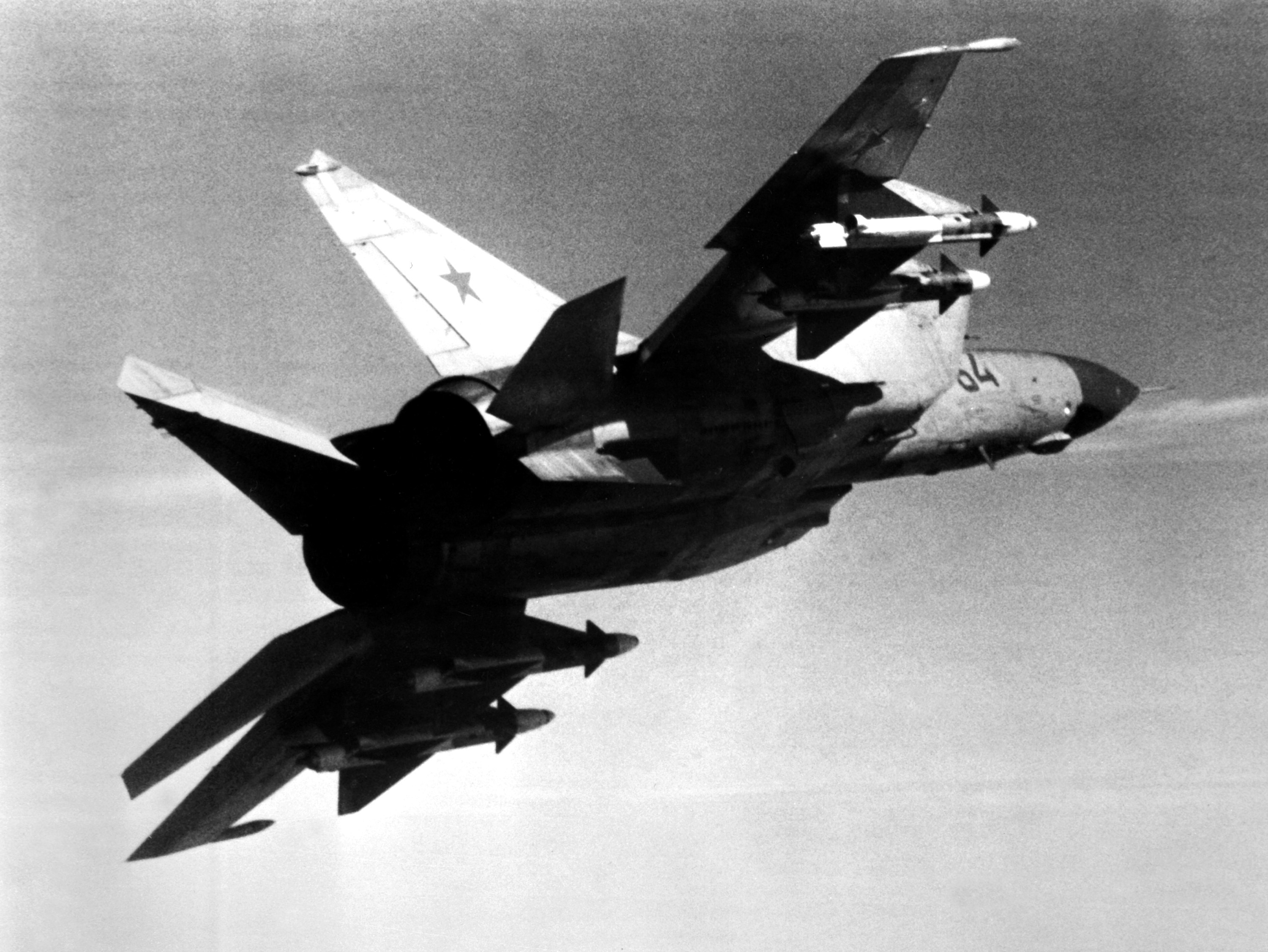
A Soviet MiG-25

==== Iran–Iraq War ====
All confirmed air-to-air kills by the MiG-25 were made by Iraq.

The MiG-25 was in service with the Iraqi Air Force during the Iran–Iraq War. Iraq claimed their MiG-25s shot down at least 15 Iranian aircraft during the war, while only one MiG-25 was lost in air combat (one more lost by SAM)

- On 19 March 1982, an Iranian F-4E was badly damaged by a missile fired by an Iraqi MiG-25.
- On 24 November 1982, an Iraqi MiG-25PD over Eivan shot down an Iranian F-5F.
- In December 1982, an Iraqi MiG-25PD over Baghdad shot down an Iranian F-5E.
- In February 1983, an Iraqi MiG-25PD shot down an Iranian C-130.
- In April 1984, an Iraqi MiG-25PD shot down an Iranian F-5E.
- On 21 March 1985, an Iraqi MiG-25PD shot down an Iranian F-4E (Iranian pilots Hossein Khalatbari and Mohammad Zadeh were killed).
- On 5 June 1985, an Iraqi MiG-25PD shot down a second Iranian F-4E.
- On 17 February 1986, an Iraqi MiG-25PD shot down an Iranian Fokker F-27. All 53 people, including crew and high-ranked officers, were killed.
- On 23 February 1986, an Iraqi MiG-25PD shot down an Iranian C-130.
- On 10 June 1986, an Iraqi MiG-25PD shot down an Iranian RF-4E.
- In October 1986, an Iraqi MiG-25PDS shot down a second RF-4E.
- On 17 January 1987, an Iraqi MiG-25PDS shot down an Iranian F-14A with an R-40 missile. Iranian pilot Major Bahram Ghaneie was rescued, and operator Lieutenant Reza Vadtalab was killed. For a long time, it was believed that this air victory had been achieved by a MiG-23ML.

The most successful Iraqi MiG-25 pilot of the war was Colonel Mohammed Rayyan, who was credited with ten kills. Eight of these kills were achieved while he flew the MiG-25PD from 1981 to 1986. In 1986, after attaining the rank of colonel, Rayyan was shot down and killed by Iranian F-14s. For the majority of the air combat Iraqi pilots used R-40 missiles.

- On 3 May 1981, an Iraqi MiG-25PD shot down an Algerian Gulfstream II.
- On 2 October 1986, an Iraqi MiG-25PD shot down a Syrian MiG-21RF.

According to research by journalist Tom Cooper, Iran claimed that ten MiG-25s (nine reconnaissance and one fighter) may have been shot down by Iranian F-14s (one kill was shared with an F-5) during the Iran–Iraq war. Only three MiG-25 losses (to ground fire or air combat) were confirmed by Iraq.

Confirmed MiG-25 combat losses during the Iran–Iraq war:

- In June 1983, an Iraqi MiG-25R piloted by Colonel Abdullah Faraj Mohammad was shot down by an Iranian F-14A.
- On 25 February 1987, an Iraqi MiG-25RB piloted by Lieutenant Sayer Sobhi Ahmad was shot down by an Iranian SAM HQ-2 and was captured.

The MiG-25 was also used as a strike aircraft during the war, targeting Iranian cities.

==== Gulf War ====
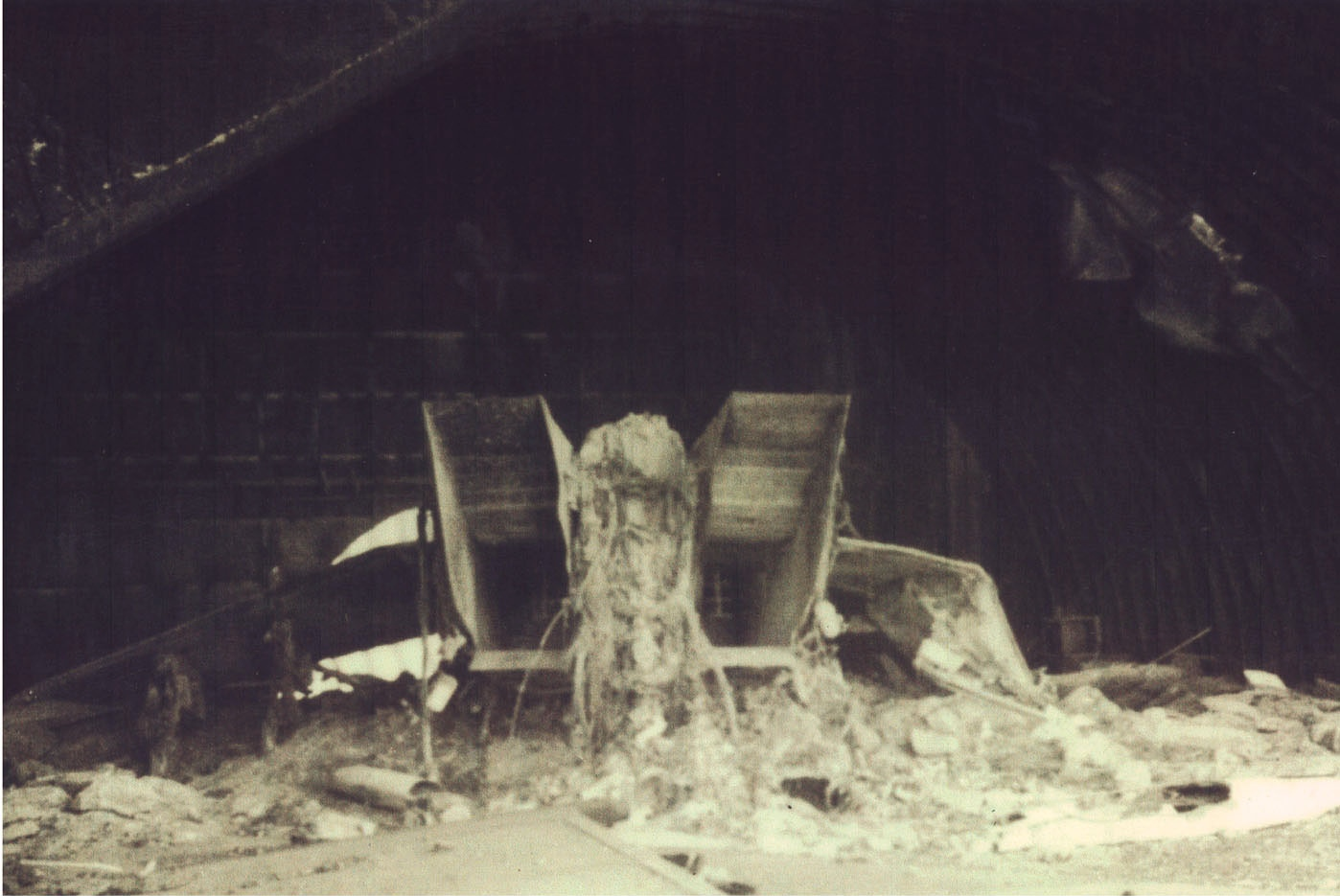
Post–Operation Desert Storm assessment photograph of an Iraqi aircraft bunker with the remains of a MiG-25 after being attacked with a 2,000 pound laser-guided bomb.

During the Gulf War, a U.S. Navy F/A-18, piloted by Lieutenant Commander Scott Speicher, was shot down on the first night of the war in the early hours of 17 January 1991 by a missile fired by a MiG-25. The kill was reportedly made with a Bisnovat R-40RD missile fired from a MiG-25PDS flown by Lt. Zuhair Dawood of the 96th squadron of the IQAF,

Two IQAF MiG-25s were shot down by U.S. Air Force F-15s on 19 January. The MiGs attempted to hide from the F-15s by using chaff and electronic jammers in order to engage the F-15s untargeted. However, the F-15 pilots were able to reacquire the two Iraqi MiG-25s and shot both down with AIM-7 Sparrow missiles. In another incident, an Iraqi MiG-25PD, after eluding eight USAF F-15s at long range, fired three missiles at General Dynamics EF-111A Raven electronic warfare aircraft, forcing them to abort their mission and leave attacking aircraft without electronic jamming support. (Note: Quote: "But as the Ravens began their second orbit in a counterclockwise turn toward the Syrian border (over Al-Qaim), a MiG-25 suddenly darted toward them at high speed. The Iraqi fired one air-to-air missile at the lead Raven and two at his wingman. The missiles flew wide, but the Ravens dived to escape and then, uncertain where the MiG was lurking, turned back to Saudi Arabia.")

In a different incident, two MiG-25s approached a pair of F-15s, fired missiles at long range, which were evaded by the F-15s, and then outran the American fighters. Two more F-15s joined the pursuit, and a total of 10 air-to-air missiles were fired at the MiG-25s, though none reached them.

On 30 January 1991, two IQAF MiG-25s attacked a pair of USAF F-15Cs patrolling the Iranian border before being chased back to base by a second pair of F-15s. The IQAF claimed to have damaged an F-15C with an R-40 missile in the Samurra Air Battle, this claim was upgraded to a kill after the Iraqi government claimed a Bedouin smuggler discovered wreckage belonging to the F-15. However, in interviews given post-war, Iraqi pilots dispute this, stating that they were demoralized by their belief that they had not mounted a single successful interception. Additionally USAF records show no F-15 being listed as damaged or destroyed on the date in question, and in accounts of the battle delivered by US pilots who participated, including by the pilot whose aircraft was allegedly damaged, no mention is made of US aircraft being damaged or destroyed.

After the war, on 27 December 1992, a U.S. F-16D downed an IQAF MiG-25 that violated the no-fly zone in southern Iraq with an AIM-120 AMRAAM missile. It was the first USAF F-16 air-to-air victory and the first AMRAAM kill.

On 23 December 2002, an Iraqi MiG-25 shot down a U.S. Air Force unmanned MQ-1 Predator drone, which was performing armed reconnaissance over Iraq. This was the first time in history that an aircraft and an unmanned drone had engaged in combat. Predators had been armed with AIM-92 Stinger air-to-air missiles and were being used to "bait" Iraqi fighter aircraft, then run. In this incident, the Predator did not run, but instead fired one of the Stingers, which missed, while the MiG's missile did not.

In August 2003, several dozen Iraqi aircraft, including MiG-25s, were discovered buried in the sand.

=== India ===
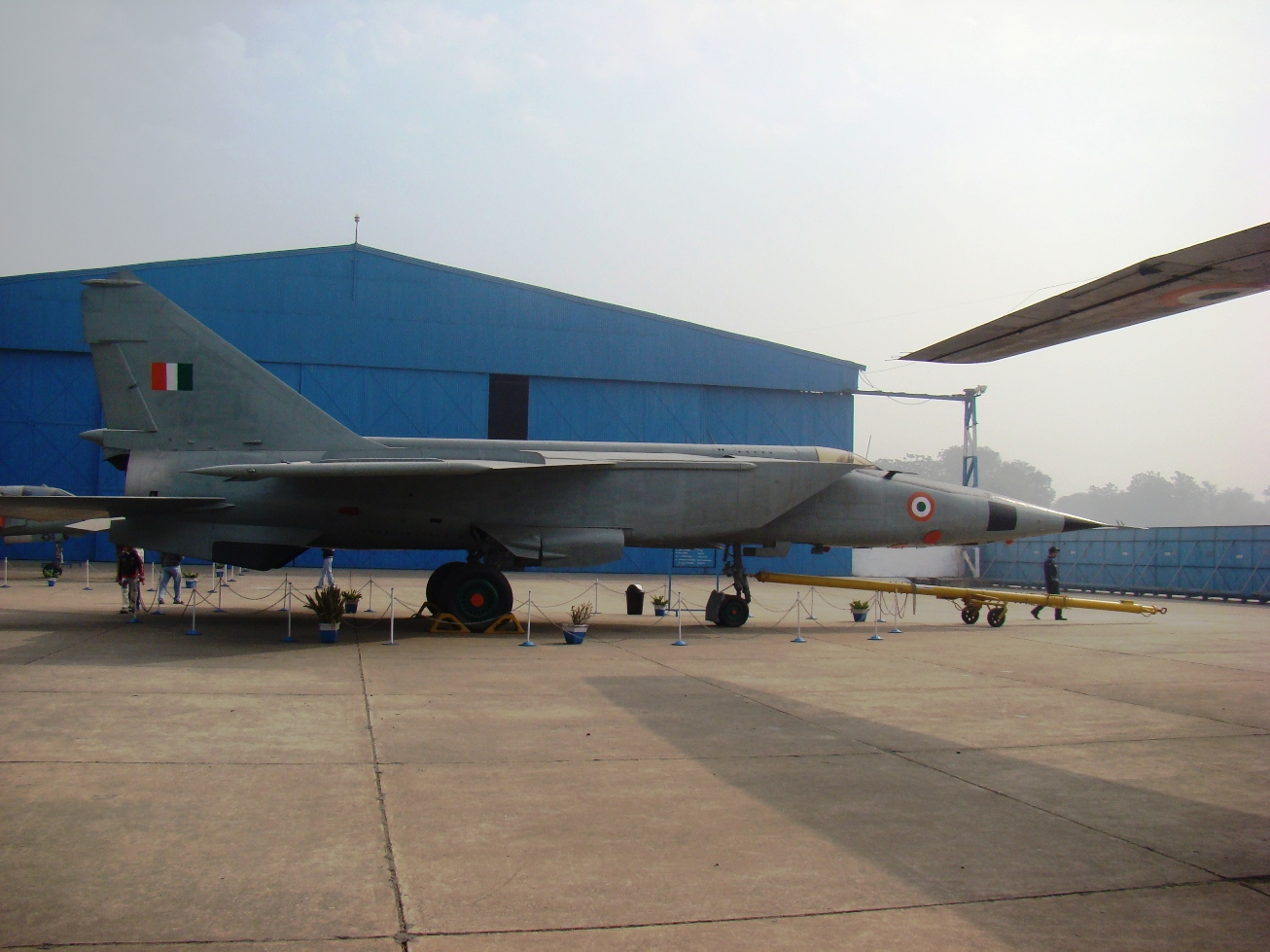
MiG-25R of No. 102 Squadron IAF on display at the Indian Air Force Museum, Palam

The MiG-25 was kept a guarded secret in India, designated Garuda after the large mythical bird of Vishnu from Hindu scriptures. It was used extensively in the Kargil War and Operation Parakram, conducting aerial reconnaissance sorties over Pakistan. (Note: Quote: "The MIG 25 was extensively used in the Kargil conflict in 1999 and also during Operation Parakram 2001.")

In May 1997, an Indian Air Force Mikoyan MiG-25RB reconnaissance aircraft created a furore when the pilot flew faster than Mach 3 over Pakistani territory following a reconnaissance mission into Pakistan airspace. The MiG-25 broke the sound barrier while flying at an altitude of around 20,000 m (66,000 ft), otherwise the mission would have remained covert, at least to the general public. The Pakistani Government contended that the breaking of the sound barrier was a deliberate attempt to make the point that the Pakistan Air Force (PAF) had no aircraft in its inventory that could come close to the MiG-25's cruising altitude (up to 23,000 metres (74,000 ft)). India denied the incident but Pakistan's Foreign Minister, Gohar Ayub Khan, believed that the Foxbat photographed strategic installations near the capital, Islamabad.

Lack of spare parts and India's acquisition of unmanned aerial vehicles and satellite imagery eventually led to its retirement in 2006. (Note: Quote: "UAVs and Satellite Imagery have made these aircraft obsolete to an extent, however these are still useful for strategic reconnaissance. Spares are a major problem as per Air Marshal A K Singh, C in C Western Air Command.")

Subsequently, six out of the seven surviving MiG-25s (the eighth aircraft was lost in a crash in 1994) have been preserved at various locations in India.

An aerial observation of the solar eclipse of 24 October 1995 over India was conducted by a MiG-25, which took images of the eclipse at an altitude of 25,000 m (82,000 ft).

=== Libya ===
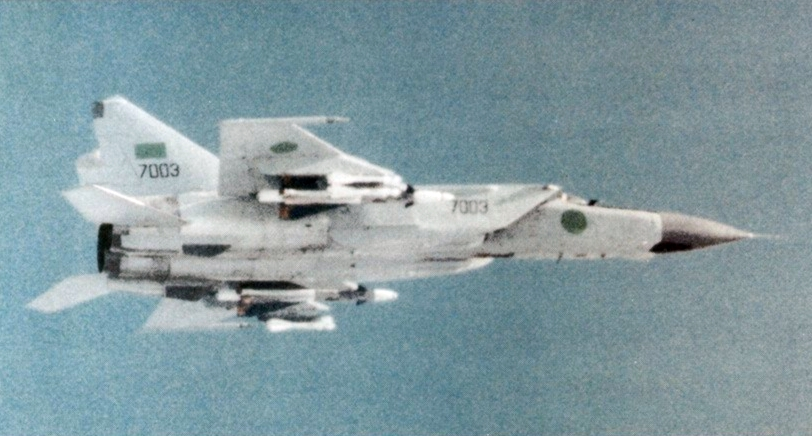
MiG-25PD of the Libyan Arab Air Force

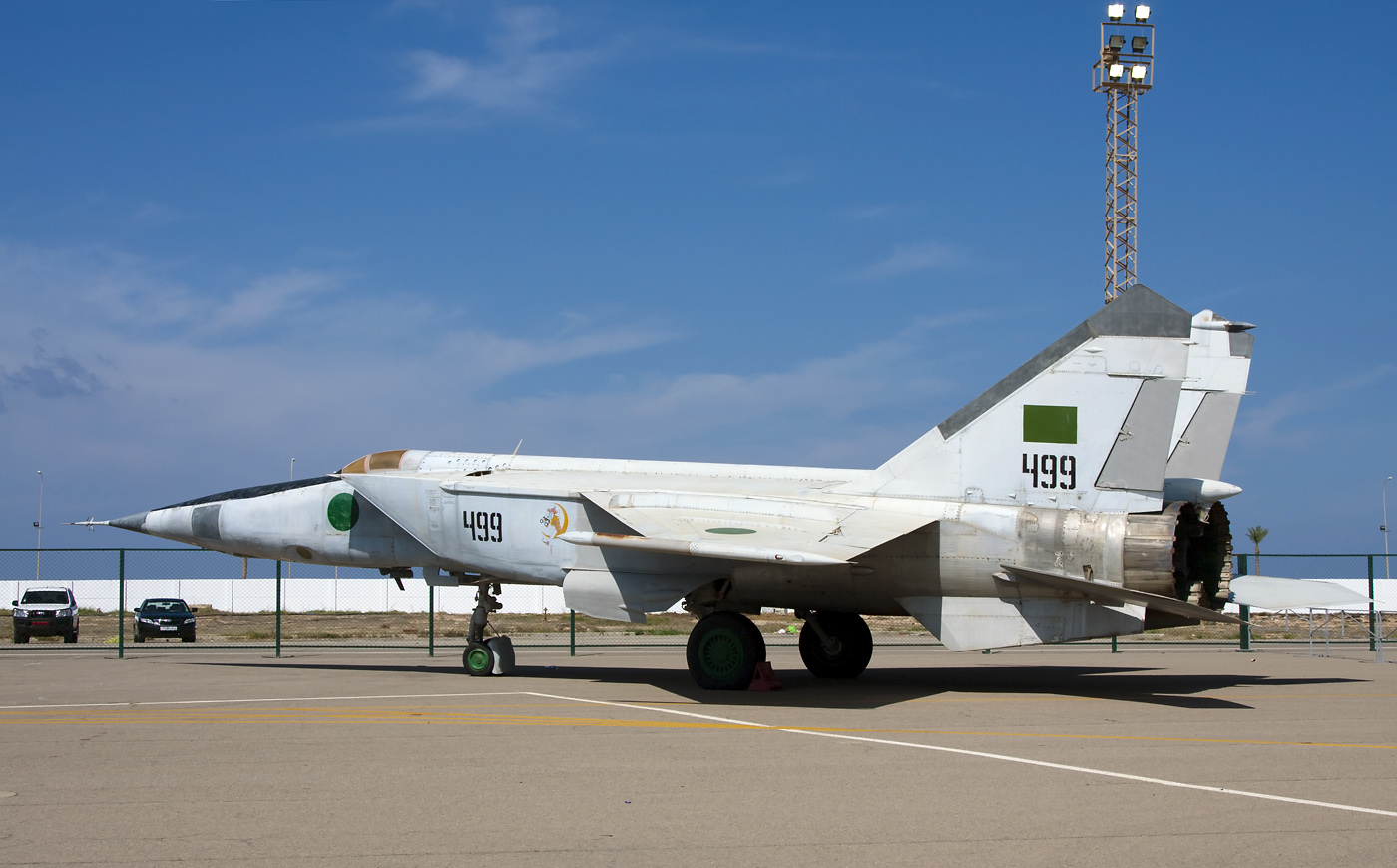
Libyan MiG-25RB in 2009

Libya was a major user of the MiG-25 as it imported 96 MiG-25PD interceptor, MiG-25PU trainer and MiG-25RBK reconnaissance aircraft in the late 1970s and early 1980s.

During the 1980s, Libya confronted the United States over some claims over the extension of its territorial waters. These incidents prompted a number of encounters between the opposing forces as it happened during the Gulf of Sidra incident (1981) with the Libyan MiG-25s taking part in them.

During the following years, the Libyan MiG-25 fleet was grounded, lacking maintenance. As MiG-25s had been grounded for several years, NATO attacks spared them during the Libyan Civil War (2011).

In 2014 and 2015, the Libyan forces under the New General National Congress controlled a number of former LARAF airframes, that were retired and stored before the Libyan Civil War in 2011, among them a number of MiG-25s. Technicians started working on some of the airframes to press them back to service in the fight against the opposing internationally recognized Libyan government forces.

On 6 May 2015, a New General National Congress MiG-25PU crashed near Zintan while attacking the civilian airport controlled by the opposing internationally recognized Libyan government, the pilot ejected and was captured by opposing forces which also claimed they downed the jet. The jet may have been on one of its first flights after re-entering service.

== Variants ==
=== Prototypes ===
Ye-155R
Reconnaissance prototypes. Two prototypes (Ye-155R-1 and Ye-155R-2) followed by four pre-production aircraft fitted with reconnaissance equipment.
Ye-155P
Interceptor fighter prototypes. Two prototypes (Ye-155P-1 and Ye-155P02) followed by nine pre-production aircraft.
Ye-266
Designation applied to prototypes and pre-production aircraft (Ye-155R-1, Ye-155R-3 and Ye-155P-1) used for record breaking purposes in official documentation supplied to the Fédération Aéronautique Internationale.

=== Interceptors ===
MiG-25P (Izdeliye 84)
It is a single-seat all-weather interceptor of which 460 were produced since 1971. It is equipped with two Soyuz Tumansky R-15BD-300 turbojet engines (dry thrust 8,790 kg, afterburner thrust 11,190 kg x 2), and the RP-25 Smerch-A1 radar and is armed with four R-40 air-to-air missiles. Its NATO designation is Foxbat A.
MiG-25PD (Izdeliye 84D)
An improved single-seat all-weather interceptor of which 104 were produced between 1978 and 1984. It entered service in 1979. An overall improvement in many aspects, the MiG-25PD is equipped with improved R-15BD-300 engines, avionics, and the Safir-25 (RP-25M). A greatly improved version of the original RP-25 Radar the RP-25M is equipped with a Moving target indication system providing a limited Look-down/shoot-down capability. The outermost pylons can carry four R-60 air-to-air missiles instead of two R-40 air-to-air missiles. NATO designation Foxbat-E.
MiG-25PDS
It is an upgraded version of 459 MiG-25Ps to the newly built MiG-25PD specification from 1979. NATO designation Foxbat-E.
MiG-25PDSL
A test aircraft that was modified from one MiG-25PD and additionally equipped with an electronic countermeasure system (ECM).
MiG-25PDZ
An aerial refueling test aircraft created by modifying a MiG-25PD. A probe dedicated to mid-air refueling has been added to the nose of the aircraft.
MiG-25M
Two testbeds (one converted from a MiG-25RB and one from a MiG-25PD) for more powerful (98.04 kN (22,040 lbf) dry, 129.71 kN (29,160 lbf) with afterburner) engines.
Ye-266M
Designation applied to MiG-25M when used for record breaking in 1975 and 1977, including setting an absolute altitude record for a jet aircraft of 37,650 m (123,520 ft) on 31 August 1977.
Izdeliye 99
Two aircraft used as testbeds for Soloviev D-30F turbofan as later used in MiG-31.

=== Reconnaissance and strike versions ===
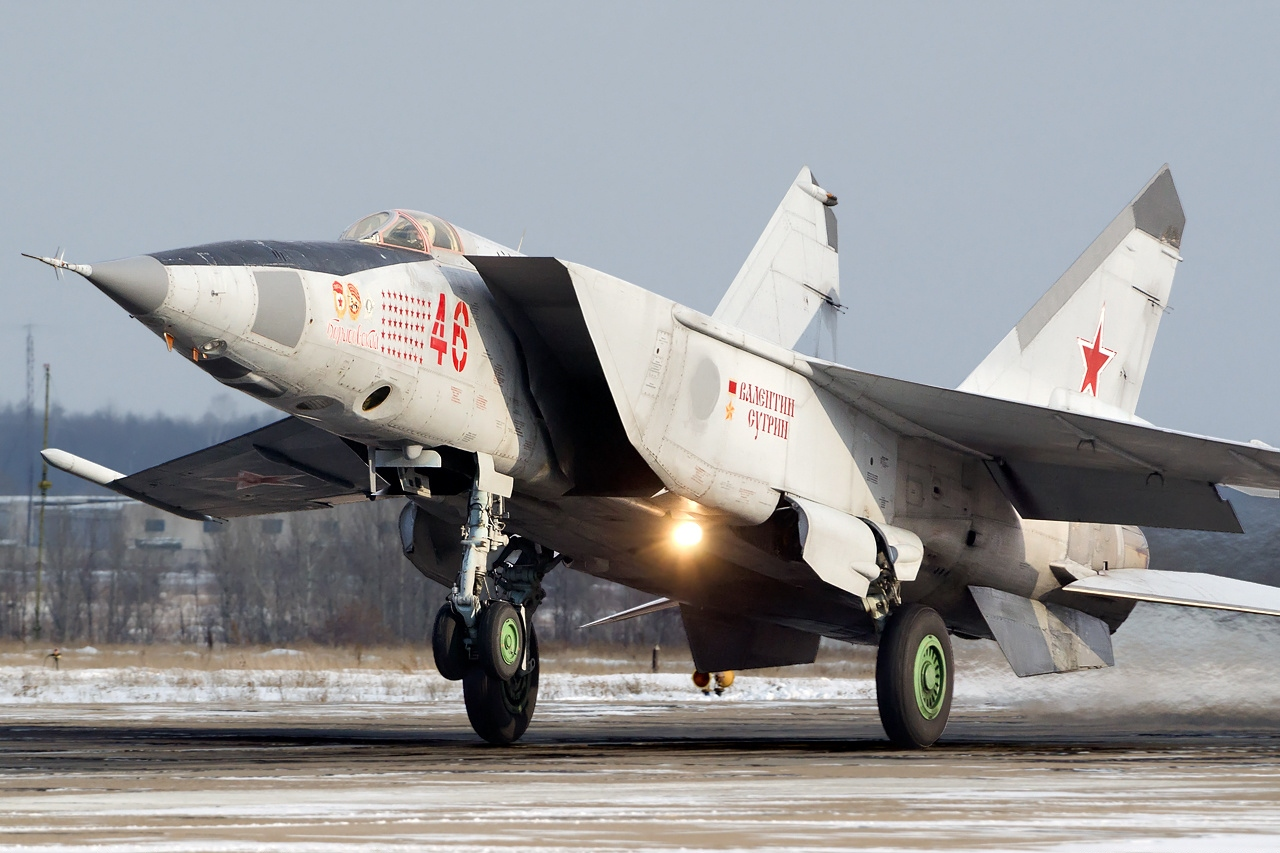
Russian Air Force MiG-25RB

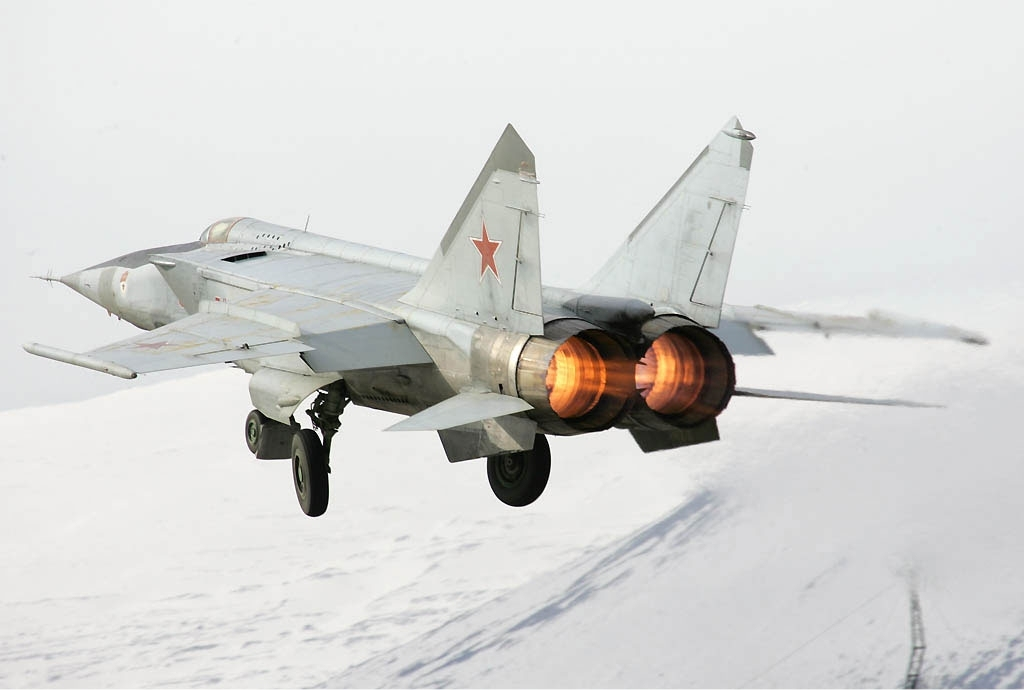
Russian Air Force MiG-25RBS

MiG-25R (Izdeliye 02)
Single-seat high-altitude daylight reconnaissance aircraft, fitted with cameras and ELINT equipment. NATO codename Foxbat-B.
MiG-25RB (Izdeliye 02B)
Single-seat reconnaissance-bomber derivative of MiG-25R, fitted with improved reconnaissance systems and a Peleng automatic bombing system. The aircraft can carry a bombload of eight 500 kg (1,100 lb) bombs. Entered service in 1970. NATO codename Foxbat-B.
MiG-25RBV (Izdeliye 02B)
Modernised single-seat reconnaissance-bomber with revised ELINT equipment (SRS-9 Virazh). NATO codename Foxbat-B.
MiG-25RBT (Izdeliye 02T)
Further improved reconnaissance-bomber, with Tangazh ELINT equipment. NATO codename Foxbat-B.
MiG-25RBN (Izdeliye 02N)
Dedicated night reconnaissance aircraft, carrying 10 photoflash bombs under the fuselage. Only single prototype built. NATO codename Foxbat-B.
MiG-25RR
Conversion of eight reconnaissance aircraft for high-altitude radiation sampling role. Used to monitor Chinese nuclear tests between 1970 and 1980. NATO codename Foxbat-B.
MiG-25RBK (Izdeliye 02K)
Single-seat dedicated ELINT aircraft, with Kub-3K ELINT system. Bombing capability retained but cameras not fitted. NATO codename Foxbat-D.
MiG-25RBF (Izdeliye 02F)
Conversion of MiG-25RBK with new Shar-25 ELINT equipment. NATO codename Foxbat-D.
MiG-25RBS (Izdeliye 02S)
Single-seat radar-reconnaissance aircraft, with Sablya-E side looking airborne radar (SLAR). Cameras not fitted but bombing capability retained. NATO codename Foxbat-D.
MiG-25RBSh (Izdeliye 02Sh)
MiG-25RBS fitted with more capable Shompol SLAR. NATO codename Foxbat-D.
MiG-25BM (Izdeliye 02M)
Single-seat air defence-suppression aircraft, armed with Kh-58 or Kh-31 air-to-surface missiles. NATO codename Foxbat-F.

=== Conversion trainers ===
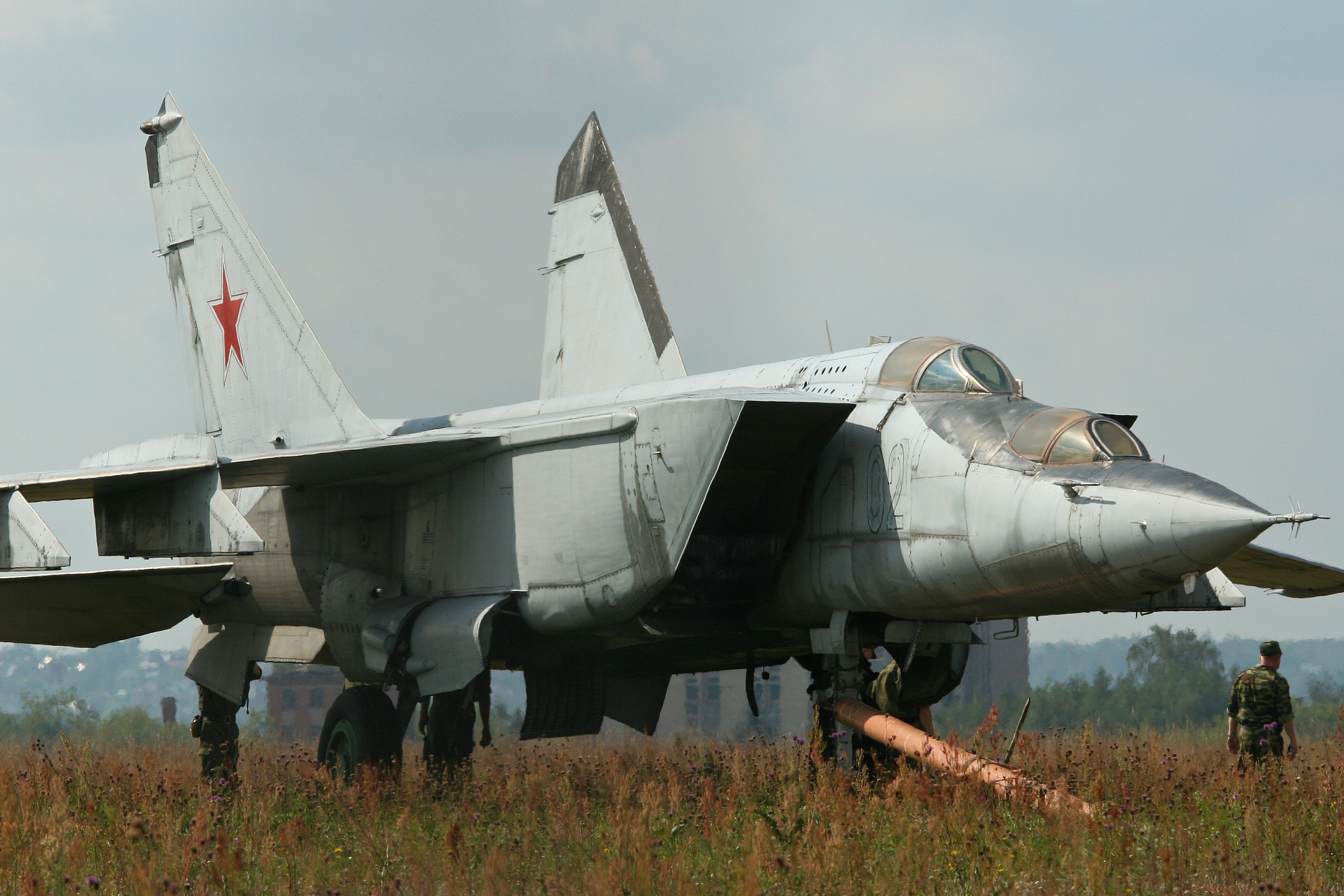
MiG-25PU trainer

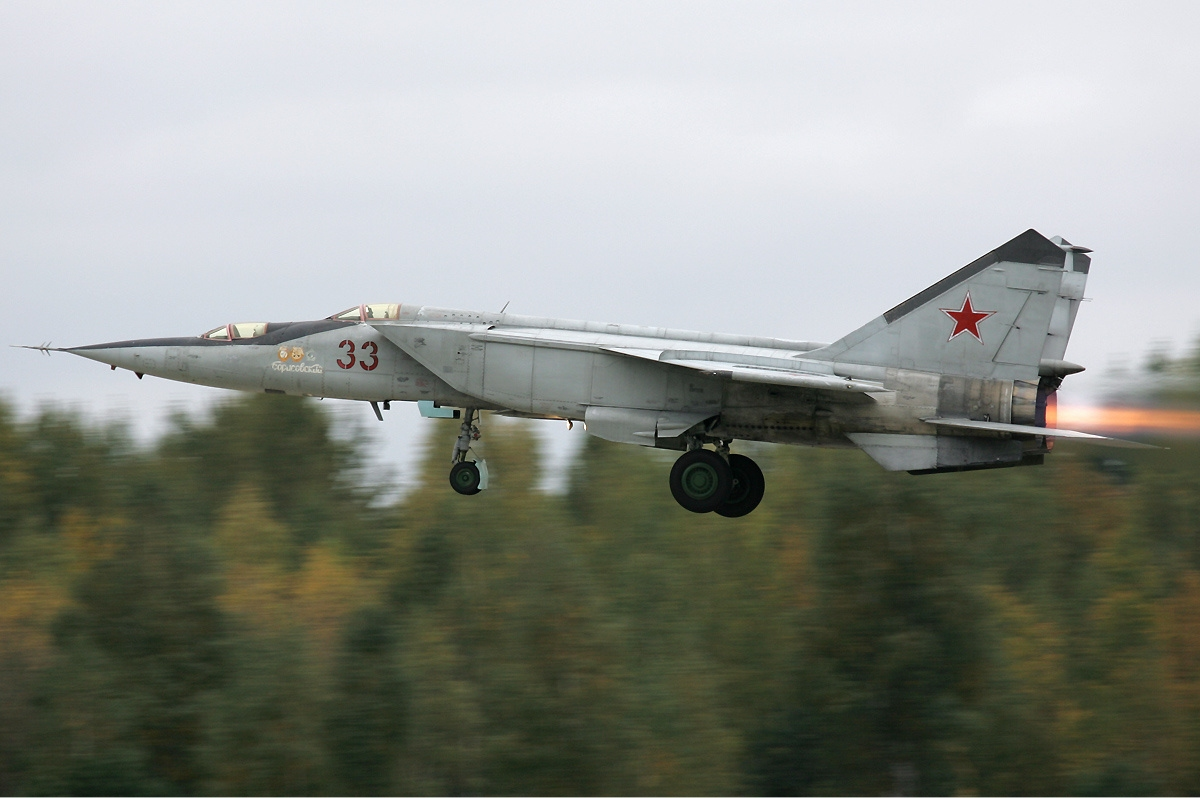
MiG-25RU trainer in September 2008

MiG-25PU (Izdeliye 22)
Two-seat conversion trainer for MiG-25P interceptors. Fitted with a new nose section with two separate cockpits. It has no radar and no combat capability. NATO codename Foxbat-C.
MiG-25RU (Izdeliye 39)
Two-seat conversion trainer for reconnaissance versions. Fitted with MiG-25R navigation system. NATO codename Foxbat-C.
Ye-133
Designation given to single MiG-25PU used by Svetlana Savitskaya to establish a number of women's speed and height records, starting with speed over a 15–25 km (9.3–15.5 mi) course of 2,683.45 km/h (1,448.95 kn) on 22 June 1975.

== Former operators ==
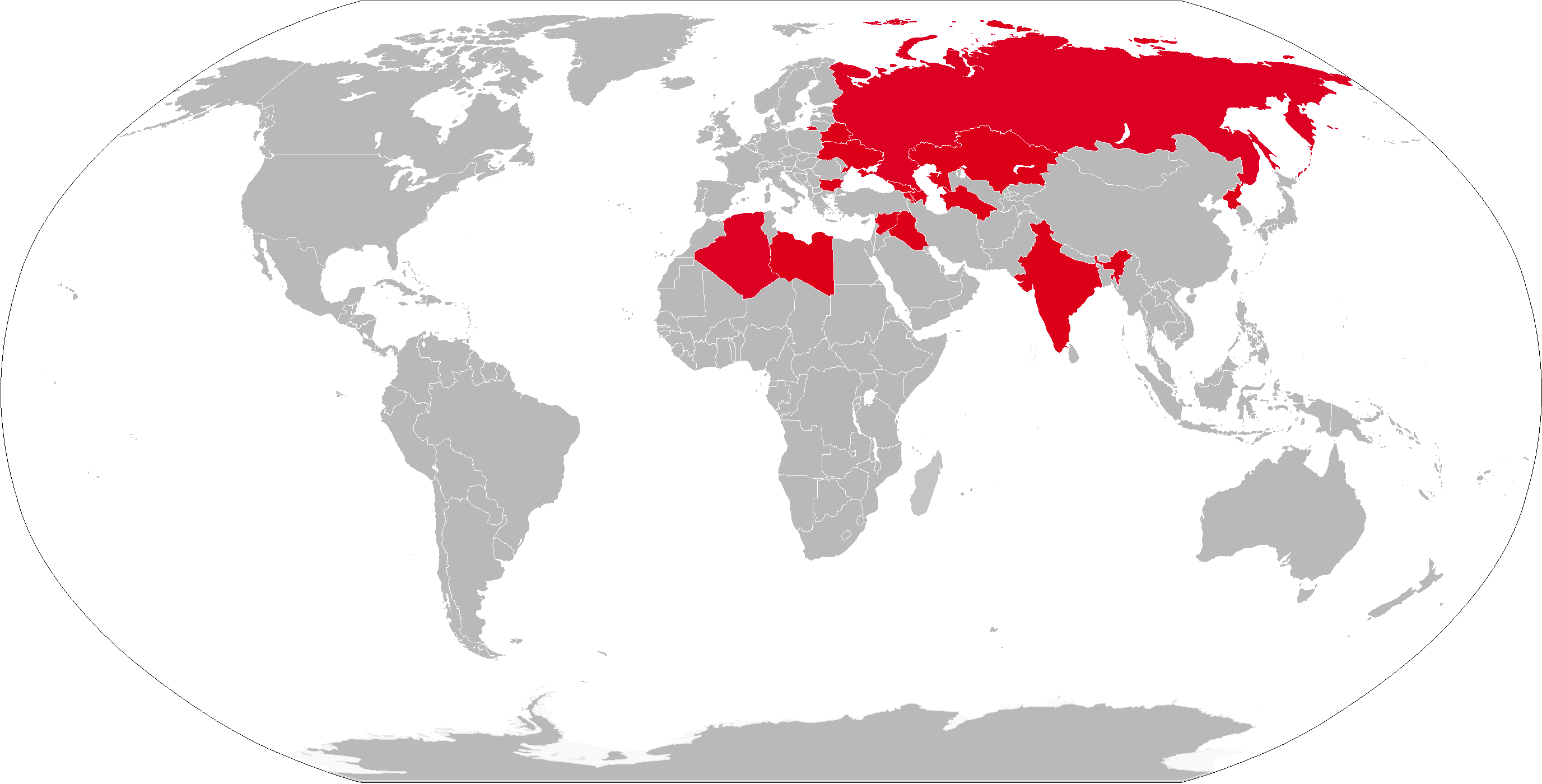
MiG-25 former operators as of 2024 in red

As of 2026, FlightGlobal's World Air Forces does not show any MiG-25s in service.

Algeria

- Algerian Air Force – Beginning in 1979, a total of at least 36 MiG-25s were received, including at least 18 MiG-25P interceptors, 10 MiG-25RB reconnaissance/strike aircraft, and 6 operational conversion trainers. The last were retired in July 2022. Flown again for a military parade in November 2024, further status unknown.

Armenia

- Armenian Air Force − Operated a MiG-25 as late as 2011

Bulgaria

- Bulgarian Air Force – Three MiG-25RBTs (#731, #736 and #754) and one MiG-25RU (#51) aircraft were delivered in 1982. On 12 April 1984, #736 crashed near Balchik Airfield. The pilot ejected successfully. They were operated by the 26th Reconnaissance Aviation Regiment at Tolbukhin Airfield (today Dobrich) until their withdrawal. In May 1991, the surviving MiG-25s were returned to the USSR in exchange for five MiG-23MLDs.

Belarus

- Belarus Air Force – Had up to 50 MiG-25s, including 13 MiG-25PDs; by 1995 the type had been withdrawn.

India

- Indian Air Force – Took delivery of six MiG-25RBKs and two MiG-25RUs in 1981. They were operated by No. 102 Squadron "Trisonics" based at Bakshi Ka Talab AB in Lucknow, Uttar Pradesh. One RBK crashed on 3 August 1994. Retired from service in May 2006. The Trishul air-base in Bareilly had Foxbats capable of flying up to 24,000 m (80,000 ft).

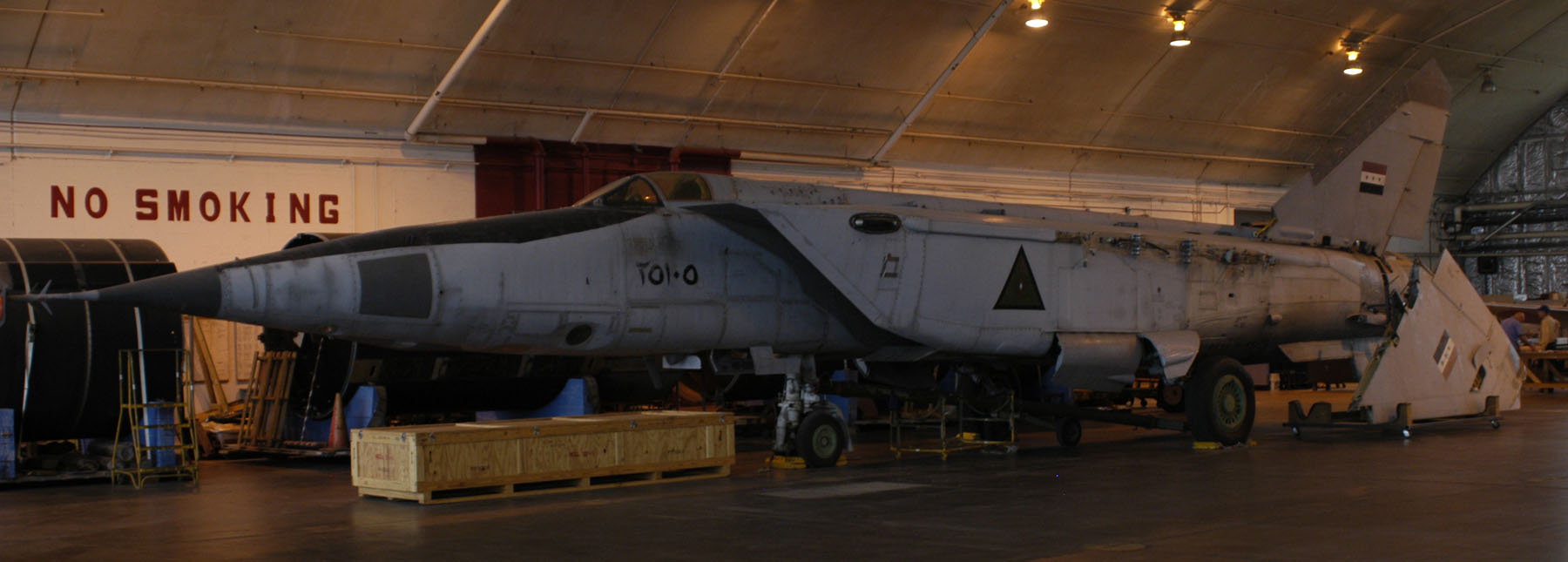
Iraqi MiG-25RB at the National Museum of the United States Air Force in Dayton, Ohio. October 2007. Found buried in Iraq in 2003.

Iraq

- Iraqi Air Force – Had seven MiG-25PUs, nine MiG-25RBs, and 19 MiG-25PD/PDSs as of January 1991. During the Gulf War (Operation Desert Storm) most of them were destroyed on the ground, two were shot down in air-to-air combat against the Coalition forces. The remaining MiG-25s in service were buried in the sand or concealed with camouflage nettings during the 2003 invasion of Iraq.

Kazakhstan

- Kazakh Air Defense Forces - Possessed 16 MiG-25RBs, under the 39th Separate Reconnaissance Nikopolksiy, and Yak-28Rs, in Balkash, now retired.

Libya

- Libyan Air Force – It was estimated that Libya had 94 MiG-25s and 3 MiG-25PUs. By mid-2008, Libya had 3 MiG-25PUs and 7 MiG-25RBs in service.

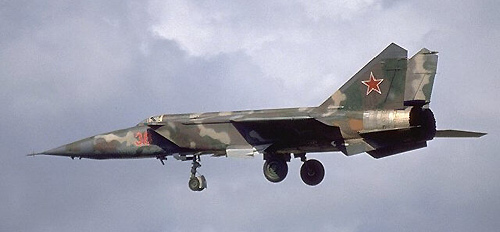
Russian MiG-25BM

Russia

- Russian Air Force – 40 MiG-25R and 30 MiG-25 for conversion training in 2011

Soviet Union

- Soviet Air Forces and Soviet Air Defence Forces – The largest combined operator historically. Soviet aircraft were passed on to its successor states in 1991.

Syria

- Syrian Air Force – Had 2 MiG-25Rs in service as of December 2022. Some 2 MiG-25Rs, 16 MiG-25PDs, 8 MiG-25RBs, and 2 MiG-25PUs trainers were received in total. All remaining aircraft were destroyed by the Israeli Air Force after the fall of the Assad regime in early December 2024.

Turkmenistan

- Military of Turkmenistan − 24 MiG-25 in 1995

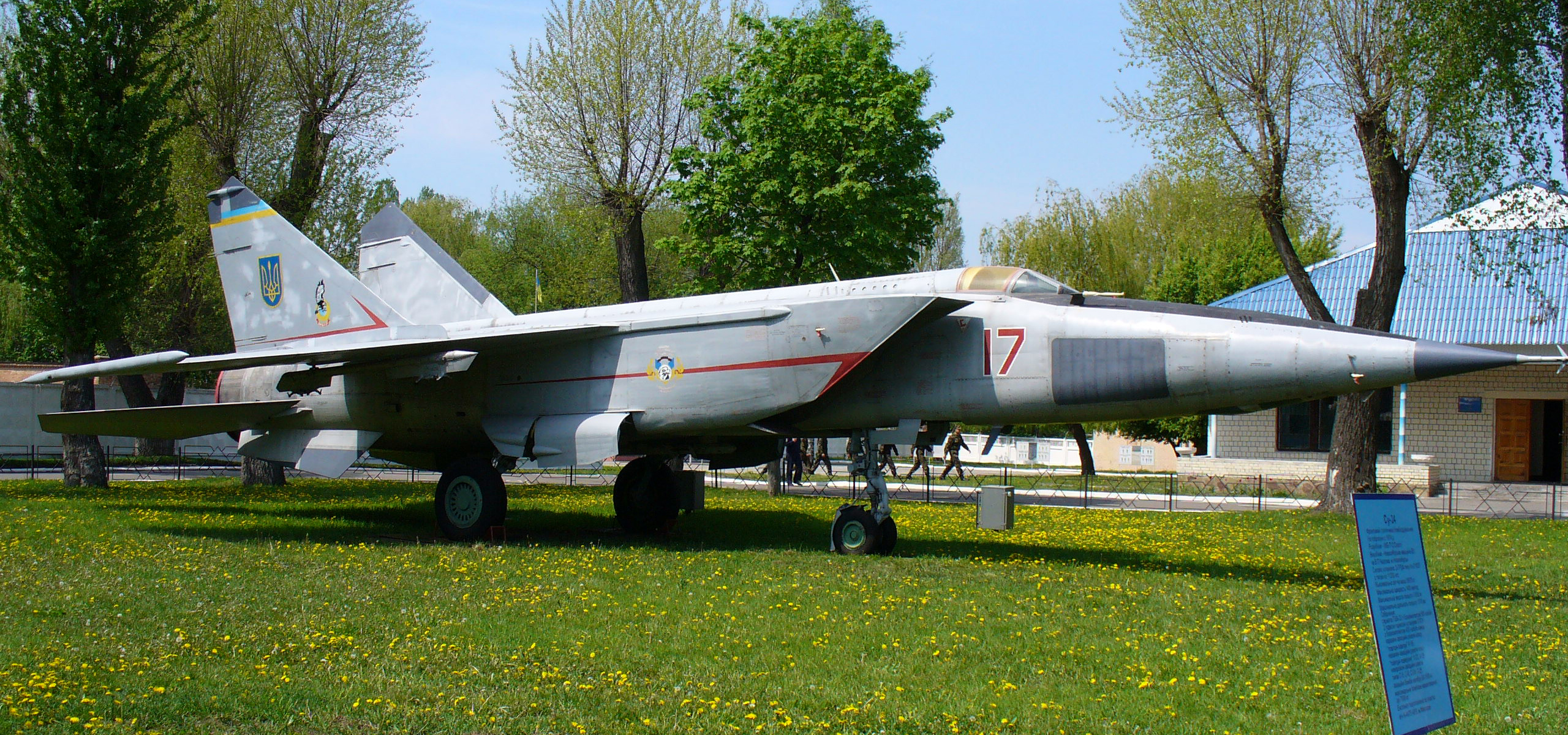
MiG-25RBS at the Ukrainian Air Force Museum in Vinnytsia

Ukraine

- Ukrainian Air Force – Inherited 79 aircraft after the breakup of the USSR. They were withdrawn from service soon after Ukrainian independence.

== Aircraft on display ==
Belarus

- 02053164 – MiG-25RBS on static display at the Stalin Line Museum in Loshany, Minsk.

Estonia

- N02050740 – MiG-25RBS on static display at the Estonian Aviation Museum in Lange, Tartu.

India

- DS-361 – MiG-25U on static display at Kalaikunda Air Force Station in Kharagpur, West Bengal.
- DS-362 – MiG-25U on static display at the Indian Air Force Academy in Dundigal, Telangana.
- KP-355 – MiG-25R on static display at the Indian Air Force Museum in Palam, Delhi.
- KP-351 – MiG-25R on static display at the National Defence Academy in Pune, Maharashtra.
- KP-3106 – MiG-25R on static display at Trishul Air Force Base at Bareilly Airport in Bareilly, Uttar Pradesh.
- MiG-25 on static display at Trishul Air Force Base at Bareilly Airport in Bareilly, Uttar Pradesh.

Latvia

- 0200004 – MiG-25RBS on static display at the Riga Aviation Museum in Riga.

Russia

- 0200001 – MiG-25R on static display at the Central Air Force Museum in Moscow.
- 66001012 – MiG-25BM on static display at the Taganrog Aviation Museum in Taganrog, Rostov.
- 84008895 – MiG-25PD on static display at the Central Armed Forces Museum in Moscow.
- 84030112 – MiG-25PD on static display at the Central Air Force Museum in Moscow.

Ukraine

- MiG-25RB on static display at the Ukraine State Aviation Museum in Kyiv.

United States

- 020657 – MiG-25RB on temporary display at the National Museum of the United States Air Force in Dayton, Ohio. This aircraft was found in 2003 during the opening months of Operation Iraqi Freedom by American forces, buried in the sand near Al Taqaddum Airbase. The aircraft had been buried to prevent its destruction on the ground by coalition aircraft. When uncovered, the MiG-25RB was incomplete, as the wings could not be located. This aircraft was one of two MiG-25s transported by a Lockheed C-5A Galaxy from Iraq to Wright-Patterson Air Force Base for examination. It was donated to the National Museum of the United States Air Force in December 2006.

== Specifications (MiG-25P / MiG-25PD) ==
3-view drawing of MiG-25

Data from The Great Book of Fighters, International Directory of Military Aircraft, Combat Aircraft since 1945, airforce-technology.com, deagel.com

General characteristics

- Crew: 1
- Length: 23.82 m (78 ft 2 in)
- Wingspan: 14.01 m (46 ft 0 in)
- Height: 6.1 m (20 ft 0 in)
- Wing area: 61.4 m^{2} (661 sq ft)
- Airfoil: TsAGI SR-12S
- Empty weight: 20,000 kg (44,092 lb)
- Gross weight: 36,720 kg (80,954 lb)
- Powerplant: 2 × Tumansky R-15B-300 afterburning turbojet engines, 73.5 kN (16,500 lbf) thrust each dry, 100.1 kN (22,500 lbf) with afterburner

Performance

- Maximum speed: 3,000 km/h (1,900 mph, 1,600 kn) / Mach 3.1 at high altitude;
  1,300 km/h (810 mph; 700 kn) IAS at sea level
- Range: 1,860 km (1,160 mi, 1,000 nmi) at Mach 0.9;
  1,630 km (1,013 mi; 880 nmi) at Mach 2.35
- Ferry range: 2,575 km (1,600 mi, 1,390 nmi)
- Service ceiling: 20,700 m (67,900 ft) with four missiles; 24,000 m (78,740 ft) with two missiles)
- g limits: +4.5 g safety overload to avoid aileron reversal (wingtips used to flex 70 cm from original position causing flatspins), around 11 g structural limit
- Rate of climb: 208 m/s (40,900 ft/min)
- Time to altitude: 20,000 m (65,617 ft) in 8 minutes 54 seconds
- Wing loading: 598 kg/m^{2} (122 lb/sq ft)
- Thrust/weight: 0.55 at gross weight

Armament

- Missiles:
  - 4 × R-40R air-to-air missiles with 15 g launch overload
  - 2 × R-40T air-to-air missiles with 15 g launch overload, only on inboard pylon
  - 4 × R-40RD air-to-air missiles with 15 g launch overload and improved range (MiG-25PD)
  - 2 × R-40TD air-to-air missiles with 15 g launch overload and improved range, only on inboard pylon (MiG-25PD)
  - 4 × R-60/R-60M dogfight air-to-air missiles (MiG-25PD)
  - 4 × R-60/R-60M dogfight air-to-air missiles + 2 x R-40RD air-to-air missiles (MiG-25PD)

Avionics

- Smerch-A2 radar based on vacuum tube electronics, for early and late MiG-25P, with up to 120 km of radar scanning distance (40 / 80 / 120 km) (50–70 km tracking fighter-sized targets, up to 105 km for bomber-sized targets at high altitude). Operational starting from 500 meters. The first examples of the MiG-25 uses the Smerch-A1, and the final variant was the Smerch-A3 after Belenko's defection with improved reliability.
- Pulse-doppler RP-25M (Saphir-25) radar based on semiconductor electronics and developed from the RP-23ML of the MiG-23ML, for later MiG-25PD, with up to 110–120 km of detection range (depending on how good the tuning of the radar).
- A RV-UM or a RV-4 radar altimeter
- SPO-10M Sirena-3 RWR (SPO-15L Beryoza for MiG-25PDSG)
- 2 x BVP-50-60 chaff/flare dispensers with KDS-155 cassettes and 30 CM rounds each (PPR-50 chaff and/or PPI-50 flares) (MiG-25PDSG / MiG-25PDSL)
- Lazour datalink (BAN-75 for the MiG-25PD)
- SRZO-2M Transmitter and SRZM-2 Receiver (IFF set)
- Vozdukh-1 GCI
- TP-26Sh IRST (MiG-25PD), 25 km of lock-on range at low altitude against afterburning targets, 50 km+ at high altitude (depending on the size of the heat source). Can slave infrared missiles for sneak attacks.
- ARK-10 ADF
- RV-UM low-range radio altimeter
- R-832M + Prizma radios
- SAU-155P1 automatic control system
- KM-1 ejection seat (replaced by the KM-1M in later MiG-25P production examples)

== See also ==
Related development

- Mikoyan MiG-31

Aircraft of comparable role, configuration, and era

- Avro Canada CF-105 Arrow
- BAC TSR-2
- Convair F-106 Delta Dart
- English Electric Lightning
- Grumman F-14 Tomcat
- Lockheed YF-12
- Lockheed SR-71 Blackbird
- McDonnell Douglas F-15 Eagle
- North American A-5 Vigilante
- North American XF-108 Rapier
- Dassault MD.750

Related lists

- Iranian aerial victories during the Iran–Iraq war
- Iraqi aerial victories during the Iran–Iraq war
- List of military aircraft of the Soviet Union and the CIS
