= AA7 =

AA-7 or AA7 may refer to:

- Vympel R-23, a Soviet medium-range air-to-air missile whose NATO reporting name is the AA-7 'Apex'
- A hieroglyph (𓐓) (Gardiner's designated symbol AA7)
- The yet to be announced seventh installment of the Ace Attorney series
