= R-40 (missile) =

Air-to-air missile developed by the Soviet Union

R-40 AA-6 Acrid
- Type: Long-range air-to-air missile
- Place of origin: Soviet Union

Service history
- In service: 1970–present
- Used by: Soviet Union, Syria, Iraq
- Wars: Iran–Iraq War, Gulf War, Operation Southern Watch

Production history
- Designer: OKB-4 MR Bisnovatyi
- Designed: 1959
- Produced: 1960s–1995
- Variants: R-40R / R-40T, R-40RD / R-40TD, R-40RD1 / R-40TD1 (radar and IR models)

Specifications (R-40RD)
- Mass: 475 kg (1,047 lb)
- Length: 6.29 m (20 ft 8 in)(radar guided) - 5.91 m (19 ft 5 in) (IR guided)
- Diameter: 0.31 m (12 in)
- Wingspan: 1.45 m (4 ft 9 in)
- Warhead: Blast fragmentation
- Warhead weight: 38–100 kg (84–220 lb)
- Detonation mechanism: Radar and active laser fuzes
- Engine: Solid-propellant rocket motor
- Operational range: 50–80 km (31–50 mi) (27-43 nmi)
- Maximum speed: Mach 2.2-4.5 (1,711-3,452 mph, 2,716-5,556 kmh, 1,466-3,000 kn)
- Guidance system: Inverse monopulse Semi-active radar homing (R-40RD); Infrared homing (R-40TD)
- Launch platform: MiG-25, MiG-31

The Bisnovat (later Molniya then Vympel) R-40 (NATO reporting name AA-6 'Acrid') is a long-range air-to-air missile developed in the 1960s by the Soviet Union specifically for the MiG-25P interceptor, but can also be carried by the later MiG-31. It is one of the largest production air-to-air missiles ever developed.

== Development ==
The development of the Mach 3+ North American XB-70 Valkyrie threatened to make the entire interceptor and missile force of the Voyska PVO obsolete at one stroke, thanks to its incredible speed and altitude performance. In order to counter this new threat, the MiG-25 was designed, but new air-to-air missiles were also required to enable the MiG-25 to engage its intended targets at the high speeds and altitudes dictated by the requirements. The Bisnovat design bureau began development of the long-range air-to-air missile in 1962. The resulting R-40 was initially matched with the Smerch-A ("Tornado-A") radar of the MiG-25. It has built in semi-active radar homing (R-40R), with an inverse monopulse seeker which give the missile ability to engage targets in all-aspects and infrared homing (R-40T) versions.

To guarantee a kill at such high speeds in thin air, a large warhead was needed to have a sufficient blast effect. Large control fins were required to give the missile enough maneuverability at high altitude. All this necessitated a very large missile. It is slightly larger than the MIM-23 Hawk surface-to-air missile.

Following the defection of Soviet Air Defense Forces pilot Viktor Belenko in 1976 and the compromising of the MiG-25P's systems and the associated R-40s, Vympel developed an improved version of the missile with a better infrared countermeasures (IRCM) resistance and more sensitive seekers. The upgraded missiles were designated with the suffix -D (for 'dorabotannye', "finalized"). Later -D1 versions were also developed.

Production of the R-40 ended in 1991, but it remains in limited service arming surviving MiG-25 and some MiG-31 interceptors.

== Combat history ==
In Soviet service, the R-40 was never fired outside of training or testing. Standard PVO procedure was to fire a two-missile salvo at a target: one heat-seeking R-40T missile followed by a SARH R-40R, to avoid the possibility of the heat-seeking missile locking-on to the radar-guided missile.

As the MiG-25 has been exported to various states in the Middle East, the R-40 has been used in combat by Iraq and probably by Syria and Libya.

During the Gulf War of 1991 on the first night, a McDonnell Douglas F/A-18 Hornet of US Navy piloted by Scott Speicher of VFA-81 was shot down over western Iraq by an R-40 missile fired by an IQAF MiG-25 piloted by Zuhair Dawood.

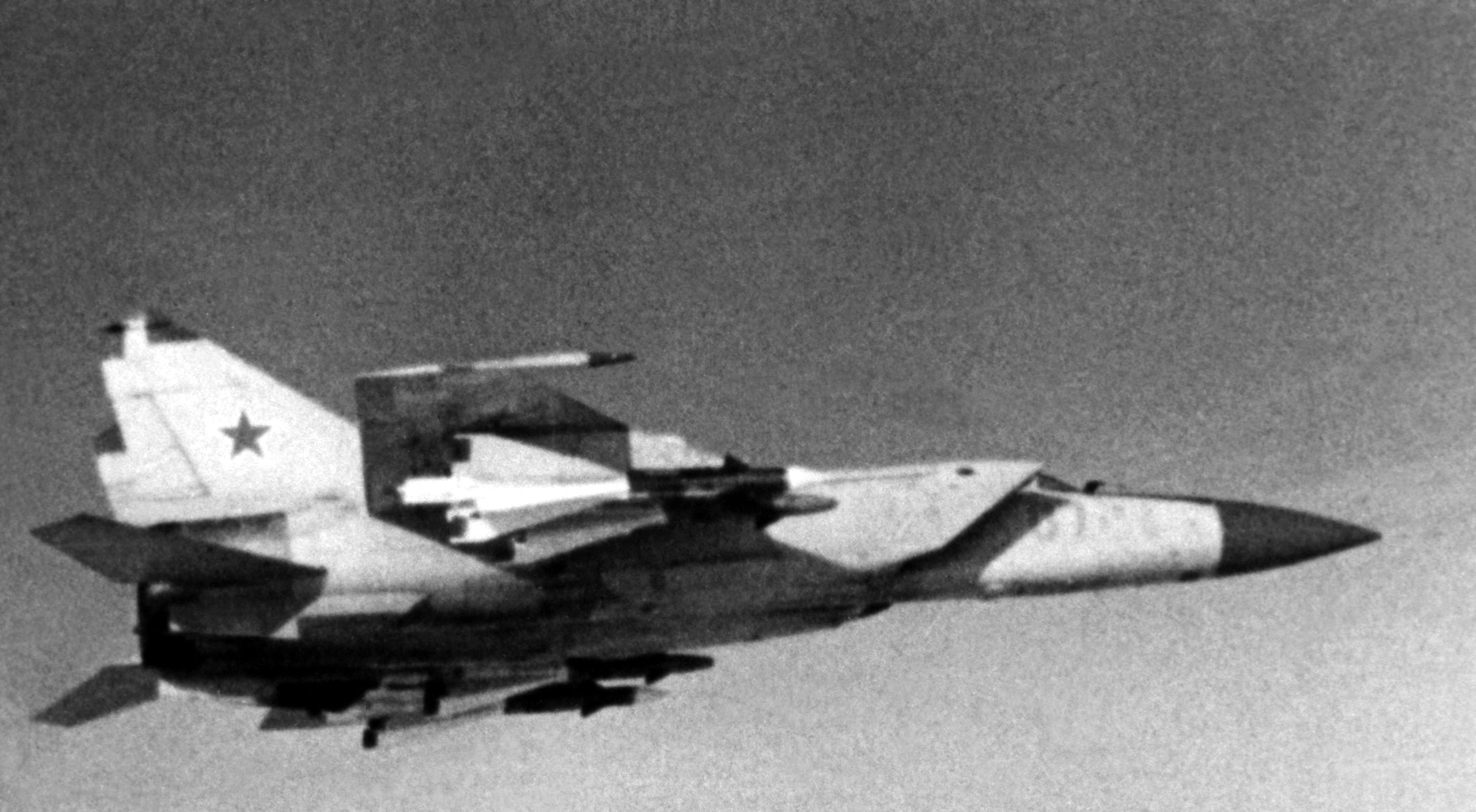
A MiG-25 carrying R-40 missiles

== Operators ==
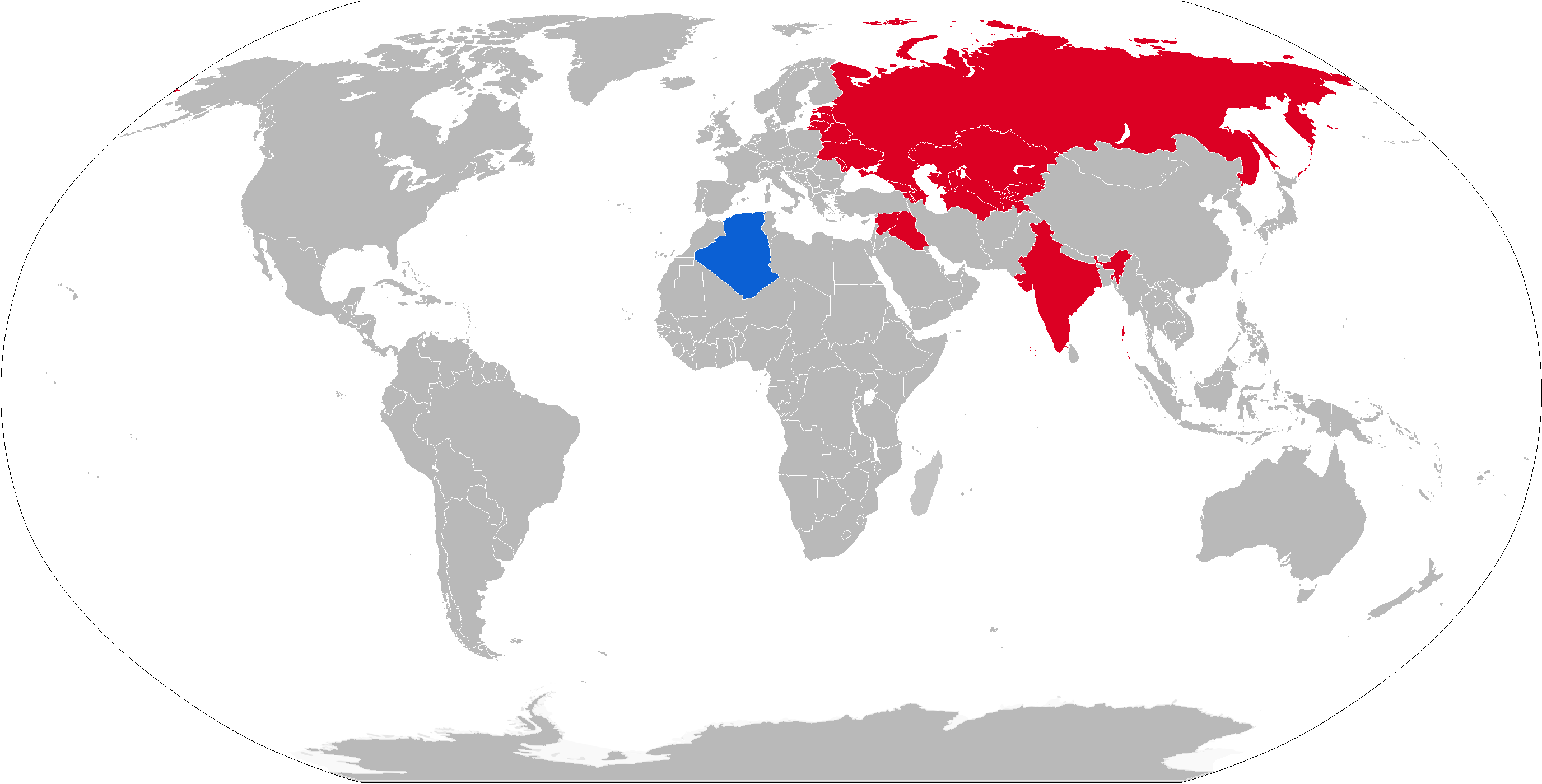
Map with R-40 existent operators in blue and former operators in red

=== Existent ===
- Algeria

=== Former ===
- Belarus
- Iraq
- Islamic State − Captured examples used as makeshift surface-to-air missiles.
- Kazakhstan
- Libya
- Syria
- Soviet Union − Passed on to successor states.
- Ukraine
