= Taganrog Aviation Museum =

Museum in Taganrog, Rostov, Russia

Coordinates: 47.24°N 38.85°E

- Таганрогский музей авиационной техники
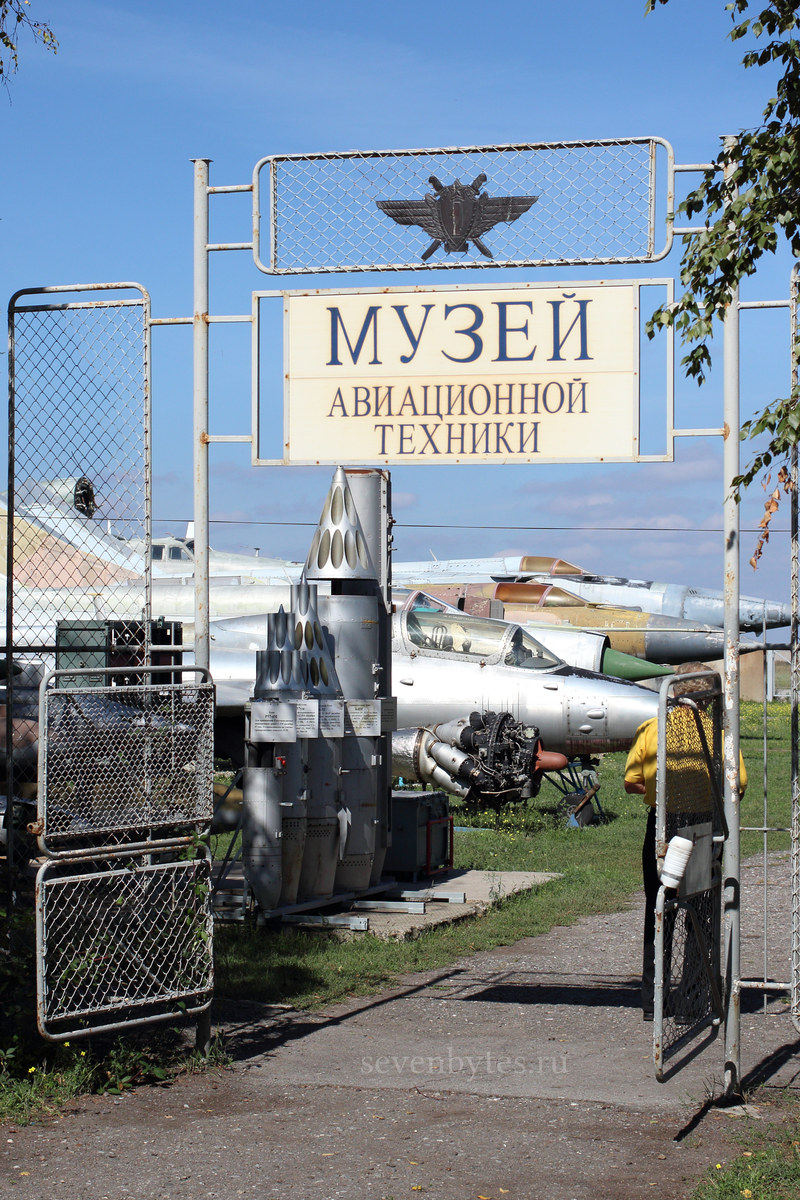
- Established: 23 April 1973
- Location: Taganrog, Rostov
- Website: web.archive.org/web/20160708024800/http://www.avia-museum.ru

Taganrog Aviation Museum (Russian: Таганрогский музей авиационной техники) is one of the eleven Aviation museums in Russia and is the only one of its kind in Southern Russia.

== History ==
Since 1948, the 325th Aviation Repair Plant (325th ARP) is located at the Taganrog-Central air base. The Aviation Museum currently belongs to ARP.

The 325th ARP repairs of An-12, An-72 transport aircraft and equipment for Il-76, Tu-142, Su-25, Su-27, Mi-8 and Mi-24 helicopters.

However, in the early 1990s, the 325th ARR had one more task: it was to create a "Base for the destruction of Aviation Equipment of Frontline Aviation". This happened according to the Treaty on Conventional Armed Forces in Europe, signed in 1990. Under this agreement, many combat aircraft from the USSR Air Force, and later the Russian Air Force, were to be disposed of. Lieutenant Colonel Vladimir Stoyanov and the commander of the base, Colonel Alexander Kornienko, appealed to the command of the 4th Air Army with the proposal to keep at least one exemplar of each type of aircraft entering the dismantlement, removing their engines and airborne systems. According to the idea of Stoyanov, the rescued machines were to become a base for the Taganrog Museum of Aviation. The commander of the 4th Air Army Vladimir Sergeyevich Mikhaylov approved their idea. On 23 April 1995 he ordered to save MiG-21bis, MiG-23M, MiG-25BM and Su-22 from utilization programme. Soon new aircraft were acquired: Aero L-39 Albatros, Aero L-29 Delfin Yak-38 and An-2.

Currently the exhibits include 12 types of aircraft. One exhibit is the MiG-25BM, of which only 40 examples were constructed, and the one that is on display in Taganrog seems to be the only one that survived.

Visitors are allowed to get inside each aircraft. As of 2022 the museum keepers were trying to acquire City Status for their museum.

== Literature ==
- Волошин В. Все начиналось с БЛАТа // Таганрогская правда. — 2006. — 18 мая. — С. 3.
- Фоминых Н. Будущая гордость Таганрога // Вехи Таганрога. — 2003. — No. 16. — С. 73.
- Чурганова И. Музей под открытым небом // Таганрогский курьер. — 2004. — 21 авг. — С. 6.
- Швидкий А. Приглашаем в наш музей // Ветеран Дона. — 2002. — 22 февр. — С. 4.
