= All-aspect air-to-air missile =

Missile designed to be launched irrespective of the relative target facing

An all-aspect air-to-air missile can track a target no matter which way the target faces relative to the missile. In other words, an all-aspect missile can be launched against a target not only in a tail-chase engagement, but also in a head-on engagement, in a side-on engagement, from above, from below, etc.

This is opposed to older infrared homing rear aspect missiles which were only able to track the hot engine exhaust of an aircraft if the aircraft's engine exhaust was pointing towards the missile seeker, and thus were only successfully used in tail-chase engagements.

Examples include the US AIM-9 Sidewinder (AIM-9L and later), the Russian Vympel R-73 and the Israeli Rafael Advanced Defense Systems Python 5 air-air/ground-air missile.
