= R-23 (missile) =

R-23 / R-24 AA-7 Apex
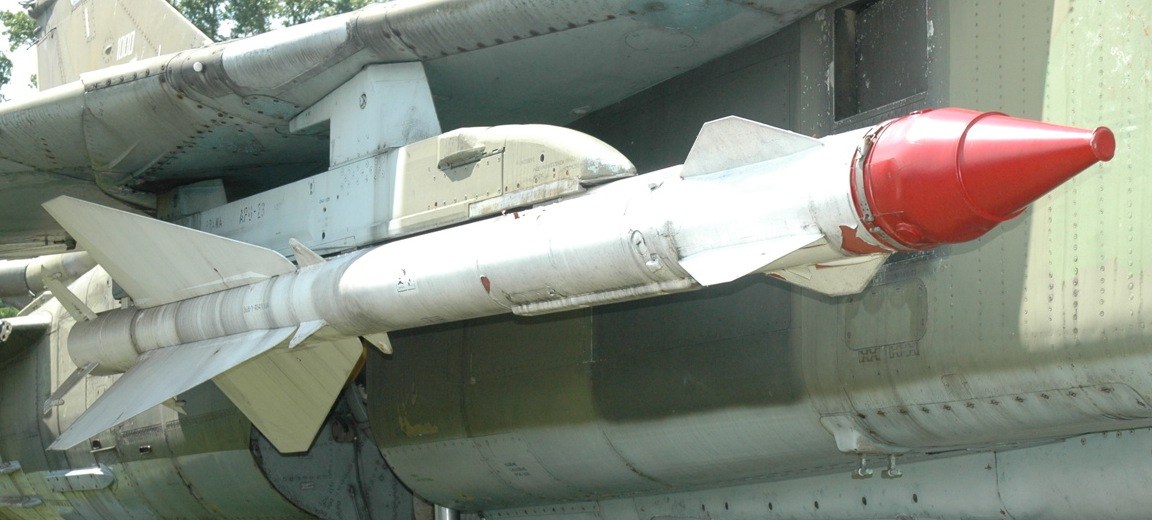
- R-23T on a Polish MiG-23
- Type: Medium air-to-air missile
- Place of origin: Soviet Union

Service history
- In service: 1974–present
- Used by: Soviet Air Forces, others
- Wars: 1982 Lebanon War; Iran–Iraq War; Operation Moduler; Syrian Civil War

Production history
- Designer: V. A. Pustyakov
- Manufacturer: Vympel NPO

Specifications (R-23R)
- Mass: 222 kg (489 lb)
- Length: 4.50 m (14 ft 9 in)
- Diameter: 223 mm (8.8 in)
- Warhead: expanding-rod high explosive
- Warhead weight: 25 kg (55 lb)
- Engine: solid fuel rocket
- Propellant: 1.04 m (3 ft 5 in)
- Operational range: 35 kilometres (22 mi)
- Maximum speed: Mach 3
- Guidance system: semi-active radar homing (R-23R/R-24R) infrared homing (R-23T/R-24T)
- Launch platform: MiG-23

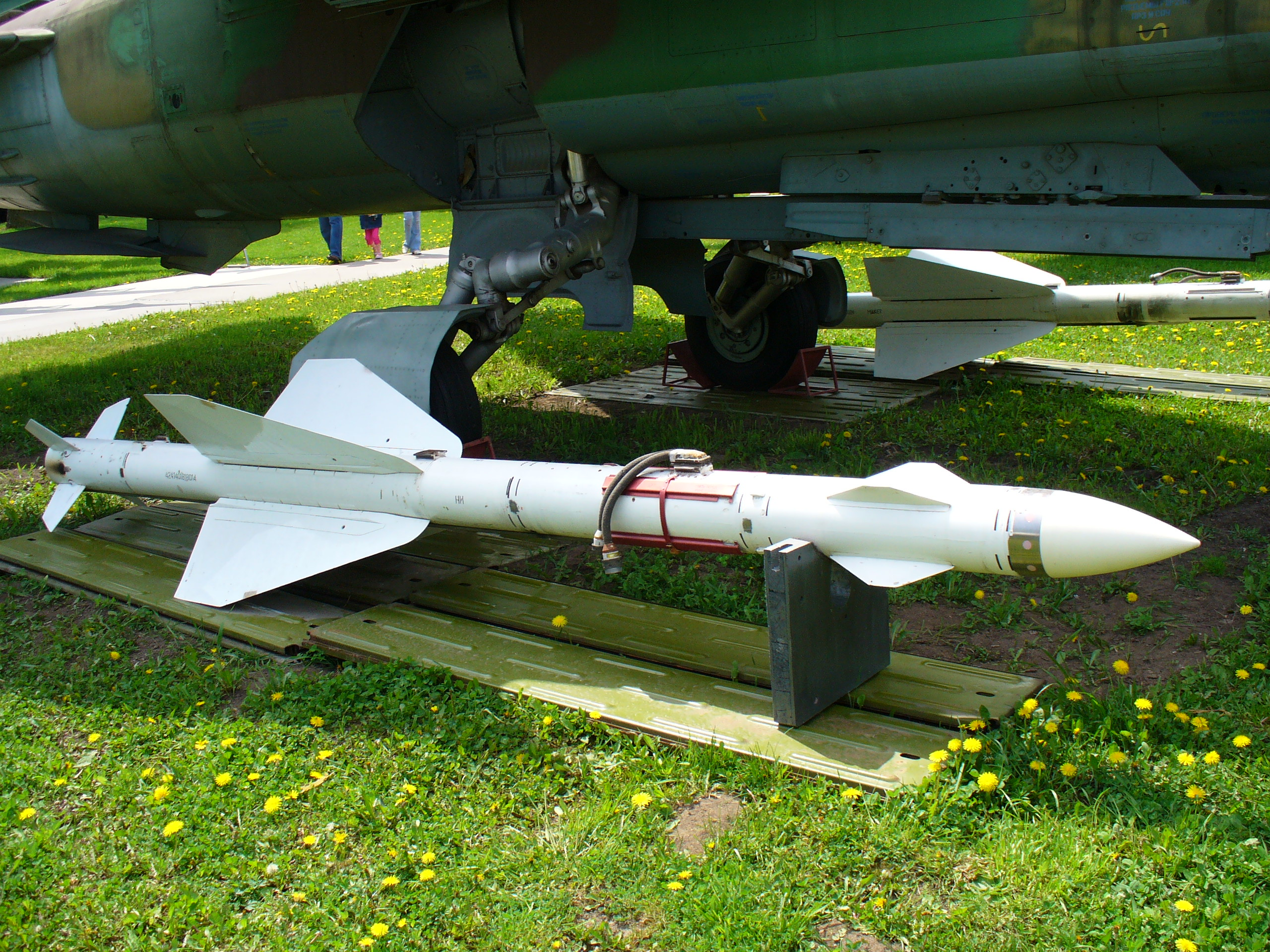
R-24R missile

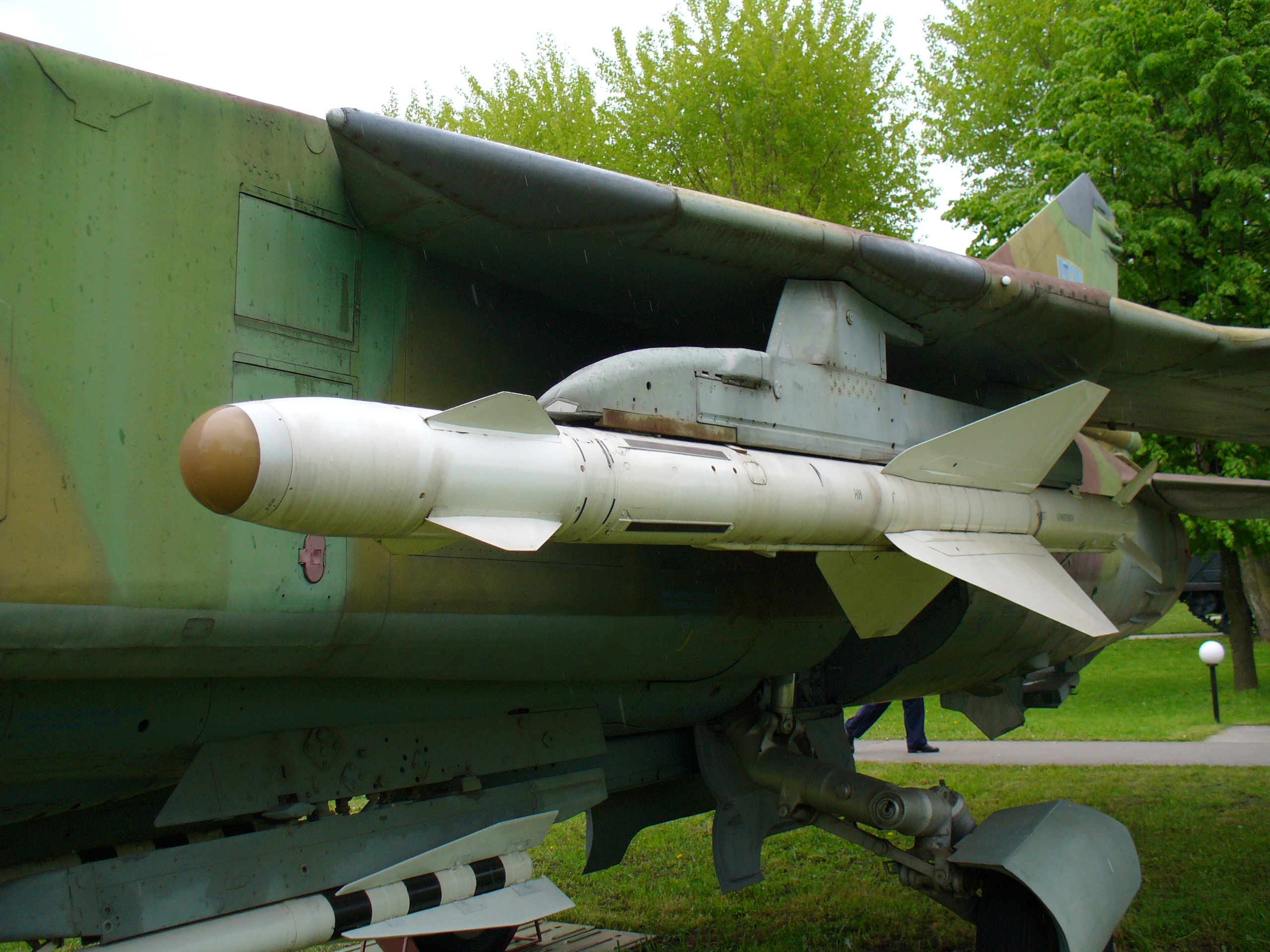
R-24T missile under a Ukrainian MiG-23MLD

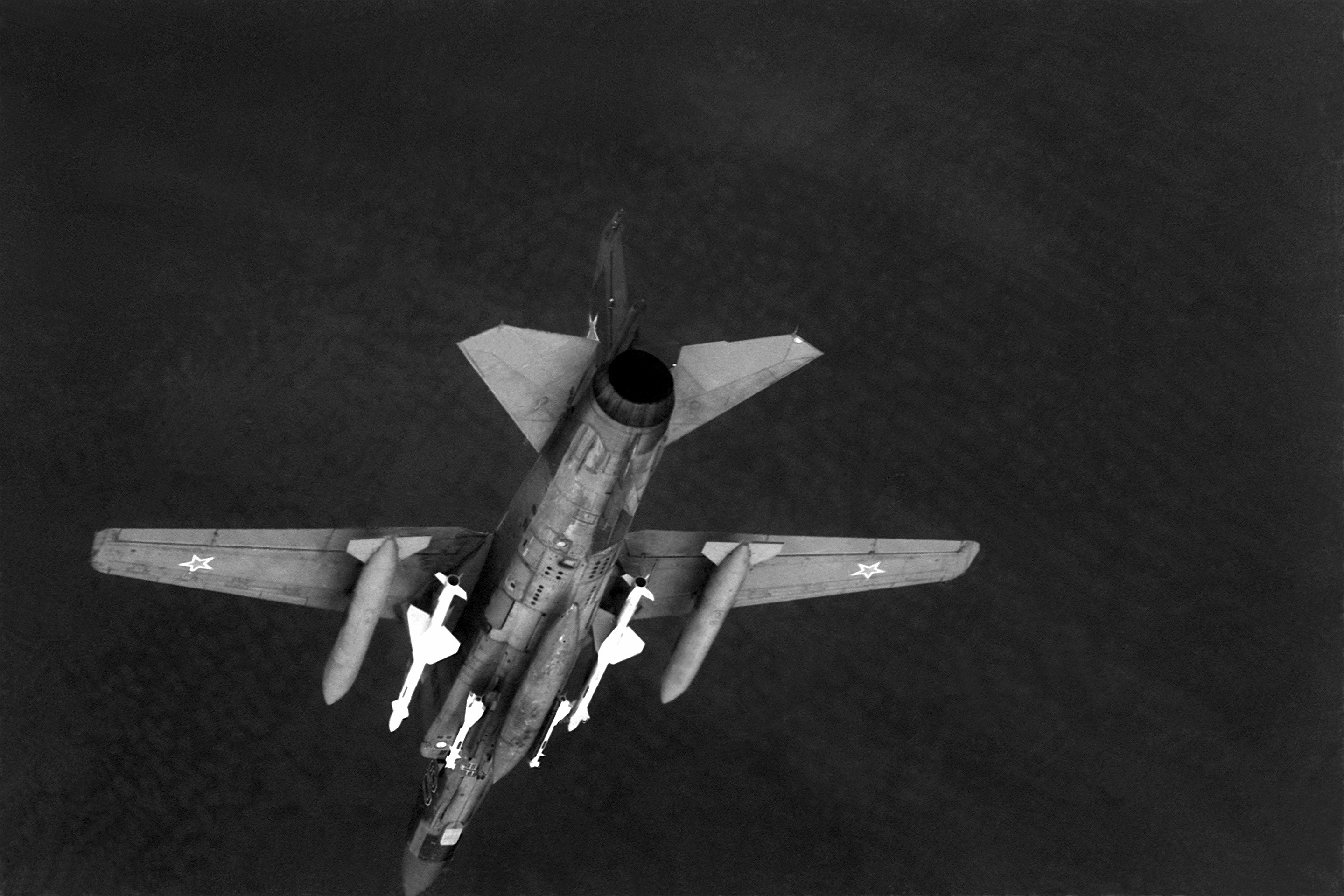
MiG-23 armed with two R-24R (long white) and two R-60 (short white) missiles

The Vympel R-23 (NATO reporting name AA-7 Apex) is a medium-range air-to-air missile developed by Vympel in the Soviet Union for fighter aircraft. An updated version with greater range, the R-24, replaced it in service. It is comparable to the American AIM-7 Sparrow, both in terms of overall performance as well as role.

== Development ==
Design of a new missile to arm the MiG-23 fighter started in the mid-1960s under the direction of V.A. Pustyakov's design team. Known as the K-23 during its design, the new weapon was intended for use against bomber-sized targets, with "snap-up" capability to attack targets at higher altitude than the launch aircraft. It originally was intended to have a dual-mode seeker using both semi-active radar homing (SARH) and infrared (IR) guidance, but this proved unfeasible, and separate SARH and IR models (Izdeliye (Product) 340 and 360, respectively) were developed instead. Test firings were carried out in 1967, although the SARH missile's seeker head proved to be extremely problematic.

In 1968 the Soviets acquired an AIM-7 and a Vympel team started copying it as the K-25. A comparison of the two led to the K-23 entering production, based largely on its better range and countermeasures resistance. The K-25 work ended in 1971. Nevertheless, several features of the Sparrow were later used in the Vympel R-27 design.

The missile, designated R-23, entered service in January 1974, the SARH version as the R-23R, the IR version R-23T. The R-23R, weighing 222 kg (489 lb), used a monopulse radar which gave it better ECM resistance compared to the AIM-7E-2. The R-23T was lighter at 215 kg (474 lb) and used a liquid nitrogen-cooled infrared seeker which required it be locked on to the target before launching, either by the launching aircraft's radar or IRST. Both versions used the same radar fused warhead, which had a lethal radius of 8 m (26 ft) and could bring down bomber-sized targets. In the West these were known as the AA-7A and AA-7B, respectively. An inert training round, the R-23UT, was also developed.

The airframe featured four delta wings arranged cruciform just behind the midpoint of the fuselage, and cropped-delta control surfaces at the extreme rear in-line with the wings. Smaller cropped-triangular surfaces are mounted in-line near the nose: known as "destabilizers", they serve to improve the rudders' efficiency at high angles of attack (the R-60 missile uses the same feature). The only external difference between the two versions was the nose cone, which was an ogive for the SARH seeker, and shorter (by 30 cm) and more rounded for the IR version.

The R-23 had a probability of kill of 0.8-0.9, though it could not hit a target maneuvering at greater than 5 G. The launching aircraft was also limited to 4 G when it wished to fire the missile. The infrared R-23T had a minimum launch range of 4 km against a target head-on, but only 1.3 km against a target in a tail-chase engagement. Its maximum range also depended on the target's facing in addition to the launcher's altitude: at low altitudes this was 11 km against head-on targets and 8–10 km against tail-chase targets; at high altitudes it was 11 km and 4 km respectively. The radar-guided R-23R had similar minimum launch ranges, but much greater maximum ranges: 14 km and 4 km against a head-on target at low altitudes, and 25 km and 8–10 km respectively at high altitudes.

Large numbers of R-23s were built, both by Molniya (ex OKB-4) as well as Vympel (ex OKB-134).

Starting in 1975 an improved version of the weapon was developed to arm the MiG-23ML/MLD, entering service as the R-24 in 1981. Both SARH and IR variants were heavier at 243 and 235 kg (536 and 518 lb) and featured a larger 35 kg (77 lb) warhead with a lethal radius of 10 m (33 ft). The warhead also had a more reliable radar fuse, which greatly reduced the minimum range to 500 m (1,600 ft) for a rear-quarter engagement and 2.5 km (1.6 mi) for a head-on attack. Both could also be launched by and against fighter-sized targets maneuvering at 7 G.

The SARH R-24R featured a RGS-24 seeker head with superior ECM resistance and lock-on-after-launch capability, which avoided interference from the launching aircraft's own radar as the missile passed by its nose. This feature, along with a larger rocket motor and a lengthening of the missile's inertial phase of flight, gave it a 30% longer range than its predecessor: 17 km and 4 km against a head-on and tail-chase target at low altitudes, and 35 km and 20 km respectively at high altitudes. The missile could hit targets at altitudes of 40 to 25,000 m (130 to 82,020 ft) and even glide into helicopters which were hovering. The IR R-24T had a much improved TGS-23T4 seeker with greater sensitivity, but still required lock-on before it could be launched. At low altitudes its maximum range was similar to the R-23, but at high altitudes it could be used against a tail-chase target from 20 km and a head-on target from 12 km. The missiles were known officially as izdeliye (Product) 140 and 160 in the USSR, and AA-7C and AA-7D in the west. The R-23/24 was also produced under license in Romania as the A-911/A901.

The R-24 remained in at least limited Russian service until the withdrawal of the last Russian MiG-23s in 1997.

== Combat record ==
=== Syria ===
The R-23 was used in the Beqaa Valley in June 1982, during the 1982 Lebanon War. However, it is hard to judge its success. Soviet and Syrian sources claim that it achieved a few kills while the Israelis deny this. According to Austrian researcher Tom Cooper, Syrian claims include using the R-23/24 against six F-16As and one E-2C, however, the only confirmed kill is against a BQM-34 drone.

During the Syrian civil war Syrian MiG-23s used R-24R missiles to shoot down 2 Jordanian Selex ES Falcos in the vicinity of Daraa province on 15–16 June 2017.

=== Iraq ===
Many R-23 / R-24 kills are reported in the war between Iran and Iraq when Iraqi MiG-23s fired them at Iranian F-14As, F-4D/Es and F-5Es.

=== Angola ===
On 27 September 1987, during Operation Moduler, an attempt was mounted to intercept two Cuban FAR MiG-23MLs. Captain Arthur Piercy's F1CZ was damaged by either an R-24 or R-60 AAM fired head-on by Major Alberto Ley Rivas. The explosion destroyed the aircraft's drag chute and damaged the hydraulics. Piercy was able to recover to AFB Rundu, but the aircraft overshot the runway. The impact with the rough terrain caused Piercy's ejection seat to fire, but he failed to separate from the seat and suffered major spinal injuries.

On 5 April 1985 at 14:30 GMT, two SAAF C-130B Hercules took off to resupply UNITA troops when they were intercepted on their return by a MiG-23ML flown by Cuban pilot Major Eduardo Gonzalez. An R-24R SARH missile was launched first and exploded prematurely against a hill or mountain. This was followed by a R-24T IR missile launched from 5 kilometres away which tracked well but passed between the engines 1 and 2 without exploding. Both Hercules were able to return to base intact.

=== Soviet Union ===
On 28 September 1988, two Soviet MiG-23MLDs piloted by Vladmir Astakhov and Boris Gavrilov shot down two Iranian AH-1J Cobras that had trespassed into Afghan airspace using R-23s.

== Specifications ==
- Length: (R-23R, R-24R) 4.5 m (14 ft 9 in); (R-23T, R-24T) 4.2 m (13 ft 9 in)
- Wingspan: 1 m (3 ft 5 in)
- Diameter: 223 mm (8.8 in)
- Launch weight: (R-23R, R-24R) 222 kg (489 lb), 243 kg (536 lb); (R-23T, R-24T) 215 kg (474 lb), 235 kg (518 lb)
- Speed: Mach 3
- Range: (R-23R) 35 km (22 mi); (R-24R) 50 km (31 mi); (R-23T, R-24T) 15 km (9.4 mi)
- Guidance: (R-23R, R-24R) SARH; (R-23T, R-24T), infrared-homing
- Warhead: expanding-rod high explosive with proximity fuze, 25 kg (55 lb) (R-23) or 35 kg (77 lb) (R-24)

== Operators ==
=== Current operators ===
- Angola
- Libya
- North Korea
- Syria

=== Former operators ===
- Algeria
- Belarus
- Bulgaria
- Cuba
- Czechoslovakia
- Czech Republic
- East Germany
- Hungary
- India
- Iraq
- Poland
- Romania
- Russia
- Soviet Union
- Ukraine
