= Mohammed Rayyan =

Iraqi fighter pilot and flying ace

Colonel Mohammed Rayyan
- Born: 1955; Baiji (city), Kingdom of Iraq
- Died: 1986 (aged 30–31); Iran/Iraq Border region
- Military career
- Allegiance: Iraq
- Branch: Iraqi Air Force
- Service years: 1977–1986
- Rank: Colonel
- Nickname: Sky Falcon
- Unit: 47th Squadron
- Conflicts: Iran–Iraq War †

Colonel Mohammed Rayyan (1955–1986) was an Iraqi fighter pilot and flying ace during the Iran–Iraq War. He scored 5 air combat kills and was the most successful MiG-25 pilot.

Rayyan, while only a Flight Lieutenant and flying a MiG-21MF, claimed two (later confirmed) kills against Iranian F-5 Freedom Fighters in 1980. Later a Captain, he qualified on the MiG-25P in 1981 and claimed 5 more victories (3 verified by western sources). Most of his victories were F-4 Phantoms. Having flown the MiG-25 was evidence of his considerable skill, as Soviet "advisers" were stationed in Iraq specifically to limit access to this advanced jet, and only the best pilots flew them.

In 1986, having attained the rank of Colonel, Rayyan was shot down and killed by Iranian Air Force (IRIAF) Grumman F-14 Tomcats.

== See also ==
- Jalil Zandi
- Hossein Khalatbari
