= Tail-chase engagement =

Attack on an aircraft that is flying away

A tail-chase engagement (or rear-aspect engagement) is one where a surface-to-air missile system or jet aircraft engages another aircraft while the target aircraft is flying away from the attacker. This makes engagement with cannons or infrared homing missiles easier because of the minimal lateral target movement relative to the attacker and the fact that the hot engine exhaust nozzle(s) are pointing directly at the attacker, making the infra-red seeker's task of tracking the target much easier.

Missiles typically have a very high chance of hitting a target in a tail-chase engagement because of the much reduced closure rate. If the missile is travelling at Mach 2.5 and the aircraft at Mach 1, the combined overtake rate of Mach 1.5 means that the missile should be easily able to respond to any evasive maneuvers the aircraft might perform. Missiles can typically maneuver faster than aircraft and in a tail-chase engagement the target has no real advantage over the missile. Its only real hope is to fly away from the missile fast enough that the overtake rate is reduced to virtually nil, and then force the missile to follow it through several turns, bleeding off its residual energy and causing it to fall away.

It has the disadvantage, however, of meaning that any missiles or cannon rounds fired at the target must be able to reach and overtake it despite the speed at which the target is moving away. This greatly reduces the effective range at which these munitions can be used. Many missiles have an effective range in a tail-chase engagement on the order of one-third or one-quarter of that in a head-on engagement. In addition, in the case of an engagement between two aircraft, the attacking aircraft will probably have to engage afterburner and chase the target down, using up a lot of fuel in the process.

== See also ==
- Head-on engagement
- All-aspect
