= Head-on engagement =

Engagement by a surface-to-air missile or aircraft with an incoming aircraft

In military aviation, a head-on engagement is one where a surface-to-air missile system or jet aircraft engages another aircraft while the target aircraft is flying towards the attacker. This makes engagement with infrared homing missiles more difficult because the hot engine exhaust nozzle(s) of the target are pointing away from the attacker. Typically only all-aspect infra-red homing missiles are able to perform head-on engagements. Radar-guided missiles are typically able, however head-on many aircraft have a much smaller radar cross-section so the radar may not be able to track/lock onto the target at maximum range in this type of engagement.

Missiles typically have a lower chance of hitting a target in a head-on engagement because of the very fast closure rate. If the missile is travelling at Mach 2.5 and the aircraft at Mach 1, the combined rate of Mach 3.5 doesn't give the missile very much time to respond to violent evasive maneuvers the aircraft might perform or to recover from being fooled by countermeasures, etc. In addition, the aircraft can turn away from the missile and then toward it again just before impact, forcing the missile to turn in a much tighter circle than the aircraft needs to in order to follow it through this maneuver. Although missiles can turn faster than aircraft, this advantage is often enough to cause the missile to fly past the aircraft without coming within lethal range.

It has the advantage, however, of greatly increasing the effective range at which missiles or cannons can be used. Many missiles have an effective range in a head-on engagement on the order of three or four times of that in a tail-chase engagement. The target aircraft effectively flies right into the weapon(s) fired at it.
