= Gulf War air campaign =

1991 bombardment of Iraqi troops occupying Kuwait

- Part of the Gulf War
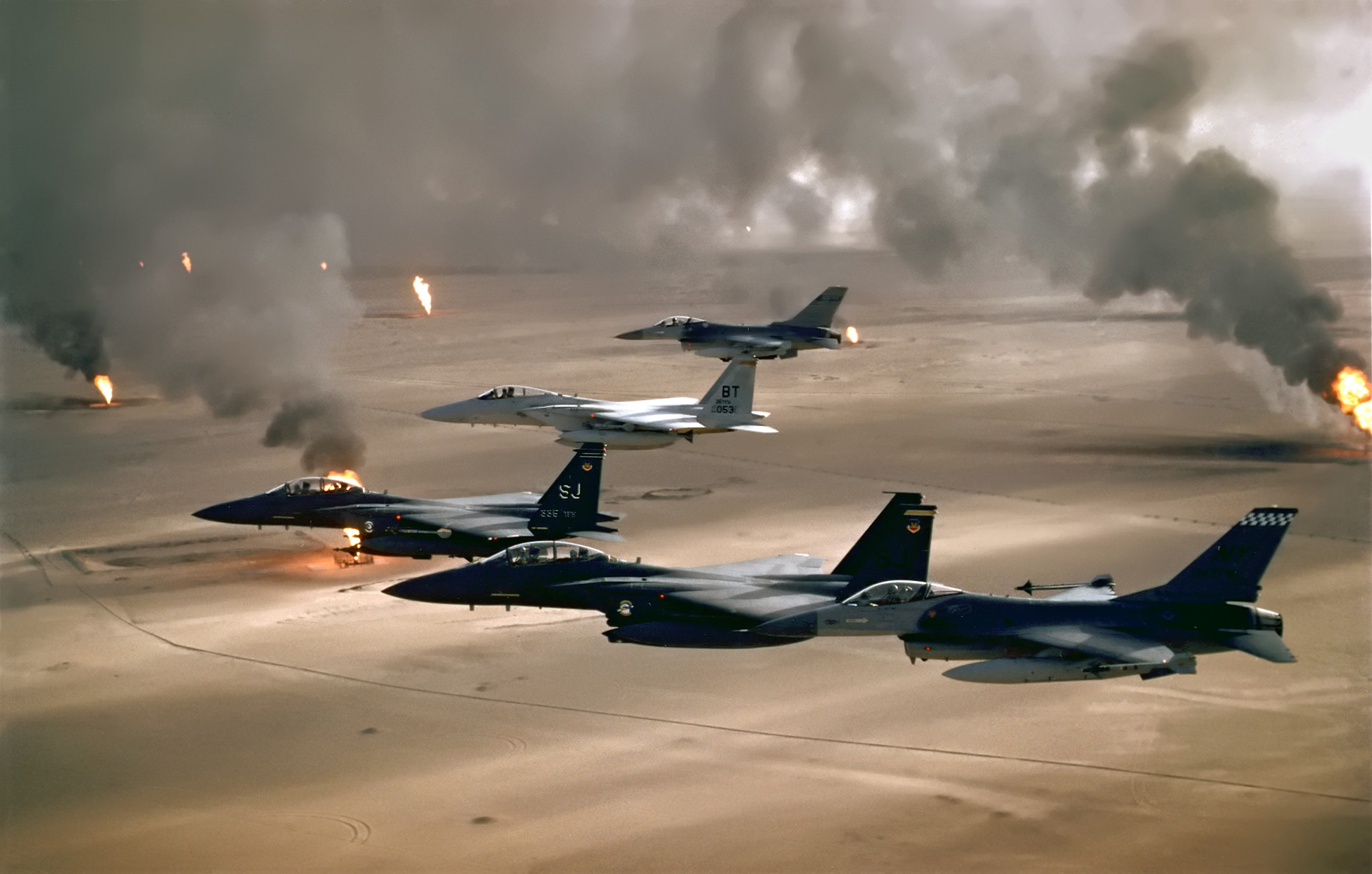
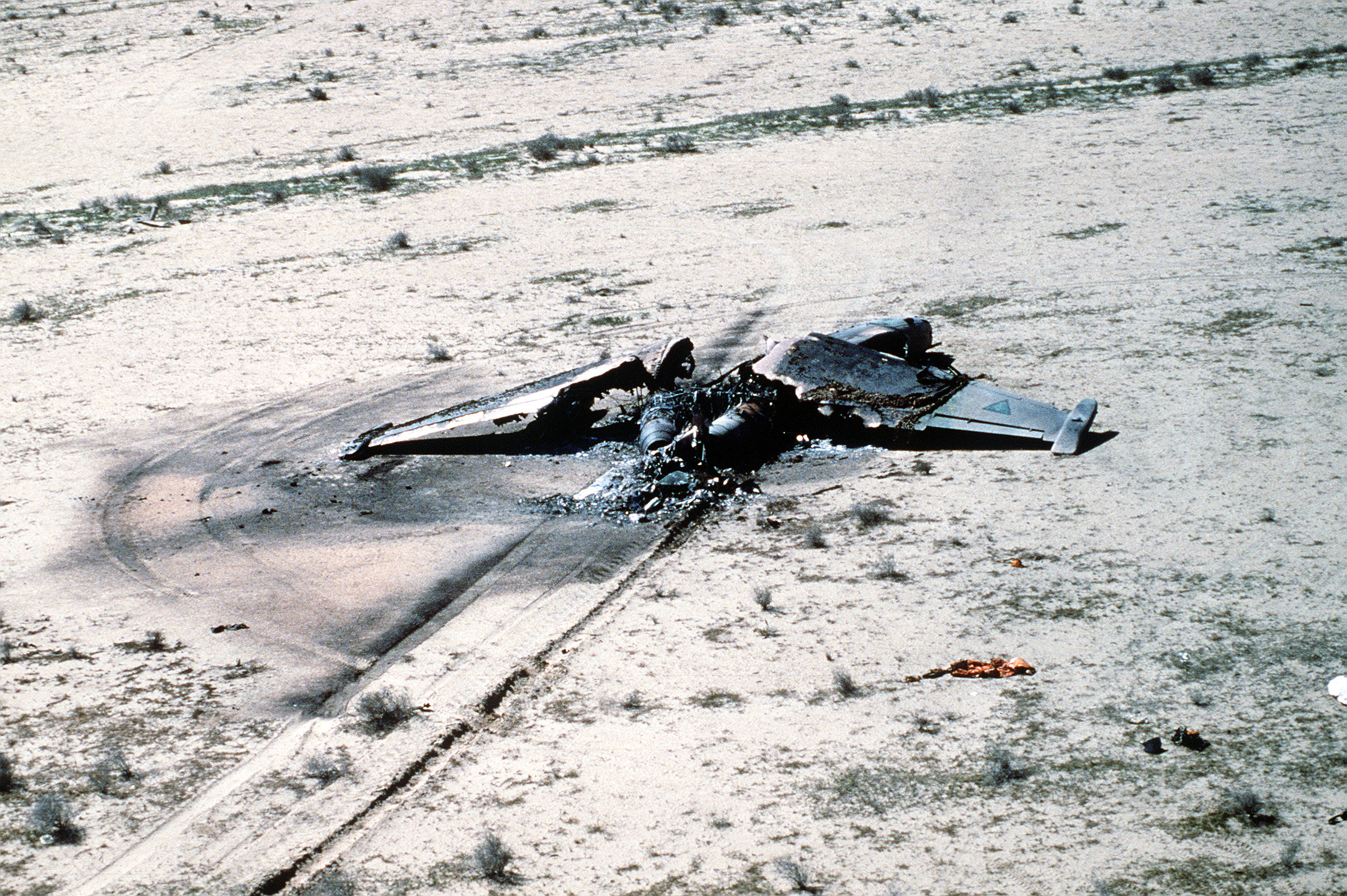
- Top: U.S. Air Force F-16A, F-15C and F-15E fighter aircraft fly over the Kuwaiti oil fires; Bottom: an Iraqi Su-25 lies destroyed on the ground at Jalibah Southeast Air Base
Date	17 January – 23 February 1991 (5 weeks)
Location	Iraq and Kuwait
Result	Coalition victory; Coalition gain air superiority within one week; Launch of the ground campaign

Belligerents
(United Nations) Coalition; United States; United Kingdom; Kuwait; Saudi Arabia; Canada; France; Italy	Iraq

Commanders and leaders
Chuck Horner; Norman Schwarzkopf; Colin Powell; Andrew Wilson; Bill Wratten; Khalid bin Sultan; Saleh Al-Muhaya (Italy) Mario Arpino (Note: See Operazione Locusta)	Saddam Hussein; Ali Hassan al-Majid

Strength
Over 2,780 fixed-wing aircraft	1,114 fixed-wing aircraft (550 combat aircraft), numerous air defence systems

Casualties and losses
46 killed or missing 8 captured 75 aircraft ‒ 52 fixed-wing aircraft and 23 helicopters	10,000–12,000 killed 254 aircraft lost on the ground 36 aircraft shot down in air-air combat several air defense systems destroyed
- 2,000–3,000 Iraqi civilians killed

Operation Desert Storm, the combat phase of the Gulf War, began with an extensive aerial bombing campaign by the air forces of the coalition against targets in Iraq and Iraqi-occupied Kuwait from 17 January to 23 February 1991. Spearheaded by the United States, the coalition flew over 100,000 sorties, dropping 88,500 tons of bombs, destroying military and civilian infrastructure. The air campaign was commanded by United States Air Force (USAF) Lieutenant General Chuck Horner, who briefly served as Commander-in-Chief—Forward of U.S. Central Command while General Norman Schwarzkopf was still in the United States. The British air commanders were Air Chief Marshal Andrew Wilson, to 17 November 1990, and Air Vice-Marshal Bill Wratten, from 17 November. The air campaign had largely finished by 23 February 1991 with the beginning of the coalition ground offensive into Kuwait.

The initial strikes were carried out by AGM-86 ALCM cruise missiles launched by B-52 Stratofortress bombers, Tomahawk cruise missiles launched from U.S. Navy warships situated in the Persian Gulf, by F-117 Nighthawk stealth attack aircraft with an armament of laser-guided smart bombs, and by F-4G Wild Weasel aircraft and F/A-18 Hornet aircraft armed with HARM anti-radar missiles. These first attacks allowed F-14 Tomcat, F-15 Eagle, F-16 Fighting Falcon, and F/A-18 Hornet combat aircraft to gain air superiority over Iraq and then continue to drop television-guided and laser-guided bombs.

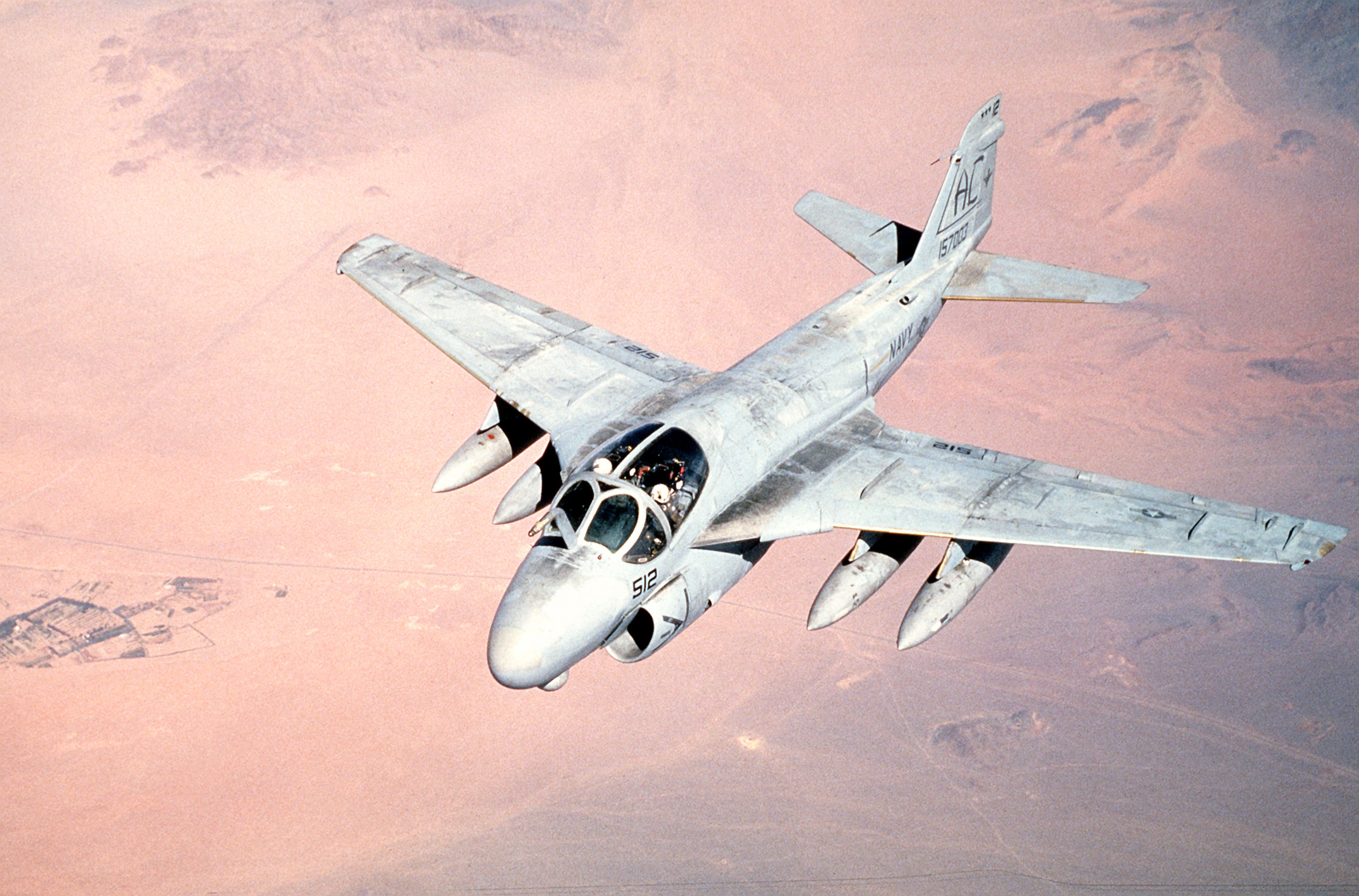
An A-6E in flight during the war. The Gulf War was the last war that A-6 Intruders were used in and replaced in favor of other attack aircraft.

Armed with a GAU-8 rotary cannon and infrared-imaging or optically guided AGM-65 Maverick missiles, USAF A-10 Thunderbolt IIs bombed and destroyed Iraqi armored forces, supporting the advance of U.S. ground troops. United States Marine Corps close air support AV-8B Harriers employed their 25mm rotary cannon, Mavericks, cluster munitions, and napalm against the Iraqi dug-in forces to pave the way forward for the U.S. Marines breaching Iraqi President Saddam Hussein's defenses. The U.S. Army attack helicopters: AH-64 Apache and AH-1 Cobra fired laser-guided AGM-114 Hellfire and TOW missiles, which were guided to tanks by ground observers or by scout helicopters, such as the OH-58D Kiowa. The Coalition air fleet also made use of the E-3A Airborne Warning and Control Systems and of a fleet of B-52 Stratofortress bombers.

== Opposing Forces ==
=== Coalition Armed Forces ===
On the eve of Operation Desert Storm, the Coalition of the Gulf War numbered 2,430 fixed-wing aircraft in the Kuwaiti Theater of Operations (KTO), almost three-fourths of which belonged to the United States Armed Forces. When the ground assault began on 24 February, that number had increased to over 2,780. Representing a relatively high tooth-to-tail ratio, approximately 60 percent of Coalition aircraft were "shooters" or combat aircraft. The United States Air Force deployed over 1,300 aircraft during the course of the campaign, followed by the United States Navy with over 400 aircraft and the United States Marine Corps with approximately 240. Collectively, the other Coalition partners accounted for over 600 aircraft.

Saudi Arabia, Kuwait, Bahrain, Qatar, and the United Arab Emirates all contributed air forces to the campaign, as did the United Kingdom (Operation Granby), France (Opération Daguet), Canada (Operation Friction) and Italy (Operazione Locusta). South Korea, Argentina and New Zealand provided a small number of transport aircraft. South Korea, Kuwait, Italy and Japan paid for the cost of 200 airlift flights into Saudi Arabia. Germany, Belgium and Italy each sent a squadron of fighters as part of their NATO obligation to protect Turkey. These aircraft were strictly defensive and did not take part in the campaign against Iraq.

In terms of quantity and quality, Coalition airpower was superior to its Iraqi counterpart. This was particularly the case in special capabilities which the Iraqis simply lacked, including aerial refueling, airborne command and control, electronic warfare, precision munitions and stealth aircraft. Such capabilities were primarily, if not exclusively, provided for by the United States. In space, sixteen military communications satellites, fourteen of which belonged to the United States, were supplemented with five commercial satellites to provide the vast majority of communication within the theater of operations. Combined they had a total transmission rate of 200 million bits per second, or equivalent to 39,000 simultaneous telephone calls. A range of other satellites provided additional intelligence-gathering services, including the Defense Support Program, Landsat program, SPOT, and six meteorological satellites.

One area where the Coalition was deficient was in tactical reconnaissance. Aircraft specializing in reconnaissance were reportedly given low priority due to lack of space and the belief that strategic platforms could take over their role, a belief which would prove misplaced. Efforts to compensate for this deficiency included using regular fighter aircraft in the reconnaissance role and RQ-2 Pioneer unmanned aerial vehicles. Deployed mainly by the U.S. Marines, the RQ-2 was sufficient for certain missions but lacking in many respects compared to dedicated aircraft.

Operation Desert Storm Aircraft - United States (Note: This list does not include aircraft operating as part of JTF Proven Force)
Aircraft	Type	Deployed 1-Jan-91	Deployed 1-Feb-91
United States Air Force
Combat Aircraft
F-15C Eagle	Fighter aircraft	96	96
F-16 Fighting Falcon	Multirole fighter	168	212
F-4G Phantom II	SEAD	48	49
F-15E Strike Eagle	Strike fighter	46	48
A-10 Thunderbolt II	Attack aircraft	120	144
F-111F Aardvark	Attack/Interdictor	64	64
F-117A Nighthawk	Stealth Attack	36	42
B-52 Stratofortress	Bomber	20	36
AC-130 Gunship	Gunship	4	2
Recon/Surveillance/Electronic-warfare aircraft
U-2 Dragon Lady	Recon aircraft	3	5
TR-1A Dragon Lady	Tactical Recon	2	4
RF-4C Phantom II	Tactical Recon	6	18
RC-135V/W Rivet Joint	SIGINT	4	7
E-8A Joint STARS	ABS/BM/C&C	2	2
E-3A Sentry	AEW&C	7	11
EF-111A Raven	Electronic warfare	18	18
Boeing EC-135	Electronic warfare	0	2
Transport/Aerial Refueling Aircraft
KC-10 Extender	Tanker aircraft	6	30
KC-135 Stratotanker	Tanker aircraft	164	194
C-20 Gulfstream	VIP transport	1	1
Learjet C-21A	VIP transport	8	8
C-130 Hercules	Tactical airlift	96	149
United States Navy
Combat Aircraft
F-14A/A+ Tomcat	Fighter/Interceptor	76	109
F/A-18A/C Hornet	Multirole fighter	88	89
A-7E Corsair II	Attack aircraft	24	24
A-6E TRAM/SWIP Intruder	Attack aircraft	62	96
Support Aircraft
E-2C Hawkeye	AEW&C	21	29
EA-6B Prowler	Electronic warfare	21	27
EA-3B Skywarrior	Electronic reconnaissance	6 or fewer	6 or fewer
KA-6D Intruder	Tanker aircraft	16	16
C-2A Greyhound	Cargo aircraft	2	2
S-3A/B Viking	Multi-mission	31	43
United States Marine Corps
Combat Aircraft
F/A-18A/C/D Hornet	Multirole fighter	72	78
AV-8B Harrier	Attack aircraft	81	84
A-6E TRAM Intruder	Attack aircraft	20	20
AH-1 SuperCobra	Attack helicopter	43	75
Support Aircraft
EA-6B Prowler	Electronic warfare	12	12
OV-10 Bronco	Attack/FAC	8	19
Lockheed KC-130	Tanker aircraft	12	15
CH-46 Sea Knight	Transport helicopter	72	120
UH-1 Iroquois	Utility helicopter	36	50
CH-53D Sea Stallion	Heavy-lift helicopter	20	29
CH-53E Super Stallion	Heavy-lift helicopter	33	48
United States Army
Combat Aircraft
AH-64 Apache	Attack helicopter	189	245
AH-1S Cobra	Attack helicopter	112	141
Support Aircraft
UH-60 Black Hawk	Utility helicopter	20	20
UH-1 Iroquois	Utility helicopter	169	197
OH-58C Kiowa	Reconnaissance	257	324
OH-58D Kiowa	Reconnaissance	79	97
CH-47 Chinook	Transport helicopter	99	127
Special Operations Command Central
HC-130 Hercules	Search & Rescue/CSAR	4	4
EC-130E Hercules	ABCCC	6	6
EC-130E Volant Solo	PSYOPS	2	2
EC-130H Compass Call	Electronic Warfare	5	5
MC-130 Hercules	Airlift/Refueling	4	4
MH-53J Pave Low	Spec Ops/CSAR	8	13
MH-60G Pave Hawk	Spec Ops/CSAR	8	4
MH-47 Chinook	Transport helicopter	N/A	4
UH-60V Black Hawk	Utility helicopter	N/A	64
EH-60 Black Hawk	SIGINT/Electronic Warfare	27	27
UH-1V Iroquois	Medivac	N/A	115

Operation Desert Storm Aircraft - Allied Countries
Aircraft	Type	Deployed	Notes
Royal Saudi Air Force
Panavia Tornado ADV	Interceptor aircraft	24	
F-15C Eagle	Fighter aircraft	69	
F-5E/F Freedom Fighter	Light fighter	87	
Panavia Tornado IDS	Interdictor/Attack	24	
RF-5E Freedom Fighter	Reconnaissance	10	
E-3 Sentry	AEW&C		
C-130 Hercules	Tactical airlift		
KE-3A Sentry	Tanker aircraft		
KC-130 Hercules	Tanker aircraft		
Bell 212	Utility Helicopter		
BAe 125	VIP Transport		
Royal Air Force/Fleet Air Arm/Army Air Corps (United Kingdom)
Panavia Tornado F3	Interceptor aircraft	18	
Panavia Tornado GR1	Interdictor/Attack	48	6 GR1a variants
SEPECAT Jaguar GR.1A	Attack aircraft	12	
Blackburn Buccaneer S.2B	Attack aircraft	12	
Hawker Siddeley Nimrod	Maritime Patrol Aircraft	8	3 R.1, 5 MR.2 variants
C-130 Hercules	Tactical airlift	7	
Vickers VC10	Aerial refueling	9	K2, K3 variants
Lockheed Tristar	Aerial refueling	2	
Handley Page Victor	Aerial refueling	8	
BN-2 Islander	Utility aircraft	1	
BAe 125	VIP Transport	1	
SA 341B Gazelle	Utility/Armed helicopter	24	(British Army)
Westland Lynx	Attack/light utility helicopter	24	AH.7 (British Army)
Westland Lynx	Maritime attack helicopter	10	HAS.4GM/HAS.3CTS (Royal Navy)
Boeing Chinook HC1	Transport helicopter	17	
Westland Sea King	Medium-lift helicopter	22	20 HC.4, 2 HAS variants (Royal Navy)
French Air Force
Mirage 2000C	Multirole fighter	12	Assigned to Al-Ahsa
Mirage F1C	Multirole fighter	8	Assigned to Doha (Opération Meteil)
Mirage F1CR	Reconnaissance	4	Assigned to Al-Ahsa
SEPECAT Jaguar A	Attack aircraft	24	Assigned to Al-Ahsa
C-160G Gabriel	SIGINT	1	Assigned to Al-Ahsa
DC-8F Sarigue	Electronic warfare	1	Operated from France
Transall C-160	Transport aircraft	5	Assigned to Riyadh
KC-135FR	Tanker aircraft	5	Assigned to Riyadh
Nord 262	Airliner	1	Assigned to Riyadh
Mystère XX	VIP Transport	1	Assigned to Riyadh
SA 330 Puma	Search & Rescue	2	Assigned to Al-Ahsa
Royal Canadian Air Force
CF-18 Hornet	Multirole fighter	18	
CC-130 Hercules	Transport aircraft		
Boeing CC-137	Aerial refueling	3	
CC-144 Challenger	VIP transport		
Italian Air Force
Tornado IDS	Interdictor/Strike	10	
Aeritalia G.222	Transport aircraft		
Kuwaiti Air Force
Mirage F1	Multirole fighter	15	
A-4 Skyhawk	Attack aircraft	20	
Royal Bahraini Air Force
F-16 Fighting Falcon	Multirole fighter	12	
F-5 Freedom Fighter	Light fighter	12	
Bell 212	Utility helicopter		
United Arab Emirates Air Force
Mirage 2000	Multirole fighter		
C-130 Hercules	Tactical airlift		
Bell 212	Utility helicopter		
Qatar Air Force
Mirage F1	Multirole fighter		
Alpha Jet	Light attack/trainer		

=== Iraqi Armed Forces ===
At the time of the Gulf War the Iraqi Air Force (IQAF) was the sixth largest in the world, with 750 fixed-wing combat aircraft operating out of 24 primary airfields, with 13 active dispersal fields and 19 additional dispersal fields. Iraq had constructed 594 hardened aircraft shelters to house nearly its entire air force, protecting them from attack. Iraq similarly possessed an impressive amount of air defenses. Its inventory included 16,000 surface-to-air missiles, both radar and infrared guided, with over 3,600 of these being major missile systems. Up to 154 SAM sites and 18 SAM support facilities were located in Iraq. Another 20 or 21 sites were in the Kuwaiti theater of operations (KTO). Iraq possessed a large number of anti-aircraft artillery (AAA), with 972 AAA sites, 2,404 fixed AA guns and 6,100 mobile AA guns. Providing complete coverage of Iraqi airspace were 478 early warning radars, 75 high-frequency radars, and 154 acquisition radars.

Much of this equipment was combined into an integrated air defense system (IADS) overseen by Kari, an automated C^{2} computer system developed by Iraq and built by French contractors in the wake of Operation Opera. Kari is the French spelling of Iraq, backwards. Kari tied the entire IADS to a single location, the national Air Defense Operations Center (ADOC), located in an underground bunker in Baghdad. It divided Iraq into four defense sectors, each overseen by a Sector Operations Center (SOC) located at H-3, Kirkuk, Taji and Talil. A fifth SOC was added at Ali Al Salem, to cover the recently conquered Kuwait. Each SOC oversaw the local airspace and commanded anywhere from two to five Intercept Operations Centers (IOCs) per sector.

The IOCs were located in bunkers constructed at Iraqi Air Force bases and tied into local radar systems, whose information they could pass on to their SOC and from there on to Baghdad. In this way a SOC was capable of simultaneously tracking 120 aircraft and selecting for the appropriate weapon system to engage them. The SOC could automatically target for SA-2 and SA-3 SAM systems in their sector, which meant the SAMs did not have to turn on their own radar and reveal their position, or an IOC could direct local interceptors to engage the targets. Baghdad was one of the most heavily defended cities in the world—more heavily defended several times over than Hanoi during the Vietnam War—protected by 65% of Iraq's SAMs and over half of its AAA pieces.

Iraqi Fixed-Wing Aircraft 1991
Aircraft	Origin	Type	Variant	In service
Combat Aircraft
Mirage F1	France	Multi-role aircraft	F1EQ/BQ	88
Mirage F1	France	Multi-role aircraft	F1K (captured from Kuwait)	8
Mikoyan MiG-29	Soviet Union	Fighter aircraft	MiG-29A (Product 9.12B)	33
Mikoyan MiG-25	Soviet Union	Interceptor	MiG-25PD/PDS	19
Mikoyan MiG-25	Soviet Union	Reconnaissance-bomber	MiG-25RB	9
Mikoyan MiG-23	Soviet Union	Fighter aircraft	MiG-23ML/MF/MS	68
Mikoyan MiG-23	Soviet Union	Fighter-bomber	MiG-23BN	38
Mikoyan MiG-21/Chengdu J-7	Soviet Union/China	Fighter aircraft	MiG-21MF/Bis/F-7M	174
MiG-19C/Shenyang J-6	Soviet Union/China	Fighter aircraft		45
Sukhoi Su-25	Soviet Union	Attack aircraft	Su-25K	62
Sukhoi Su-24	Soviet Union	Attack/Interdictor	Su-24MK	30
Sukhoi Su-22	Soviet Union	Fighter-bomber	Su-22M2/M3/M4	68
Sukhoi Su-20	Soviet Union	Fighter-bomber		18
Sukhoi Su-7	Soviet Union	Fighter-bomber	Su-7BKL	54
Tupolev Tu-16	Soviet Union	Heavy bomber	Tu-16KSR-2-11	3
Tupolev Tu-22	Soviet Union	Medium bomber	Tu-22B/U	4
Xian H-6	China	Strategic bomber	H-6D	4
Transport
Antonov An-26	Soviet Union	Transport		5
Ilyushin Il-76	Soviet Union	Transport		19
Dassault Falcon 20	France	VIP Transport		2
Dassault Falcon 50	France	VIP Transport		3
Lockheed Jetstar	United States	VIP Transport		6
Trainers
Mikoyan MiG-29	Soviet Union	Conversion Trainer	MiG-29UB	4
Mikoyan MiG-25	Soviet Union	Conversion Trainer	MiG-25PU	7
Mikoyan MiG-23	Soviet Union	Conversion Trainer	MiG-23U	21
Mikoyan MiG-21	Soviet Union	Conversion Trainer	MiG-21U	62
Sukhoi Su-25	Soviet Union	Trainer/Attack	Su-25U	4
Sukhoi Su-22	Soviet Union	Trainer/Attack	Su-22U	10
BAC Jet Provost	United Kingdom	Trainer		20
Aero L-39 Albatros	Czechoslovakia	Trainer/Attack		67
Embraer Tucano	Brazil	Trainer/COIN		78
FFA AS-202 Bravo	Switzerland	Trainer		34

Iraqi SAM Launchers 1991
Type	Origin	In Service	Deployment	Organization
Major SAMs
SA-2 Guideline	Soviet Union	160	Major cities	20-30 batteries
SA-3 Goa	Soviet Union	140	Major cities	25-50 batteries
SA-6 Gainful	Soviet Union	100+ to 140-150	Strategic targets Republican Guard; Armored Divisions	36-55 batteries
Light SAMs
SA-8 Gecko	Soviet Union	30-40 to 170-190	Strategic targets Republican Guard; Armored Divisions	20+ batteries
Roland	France	50-60 to 90-100	Airfields	
I-HAWK	United States	3 (captured from Kuwait)		
SA-9 Gaskin	Soviet Union	400	Regular Army	
SA-13 Gopher	Soviet Union	192	Republican Guard	
SA-7 Grail	Soviet Union	6,500	MANPADS	
SA-14 Gremlin	Soviet Union	288 to "thousands"	MANPADS	

Iraqi Anti-Aircraft Artillery 1991
Type	Calibre	Origin
Self-Propelled
ZSU-57-2	57mm	Soviet Union
M53/59 Praga	30mm	Czechoslovakia
ZSU-23-4	23mm	Soviet Union
Towed
KS-30	130mm	Soviet Union
KS-19	100mm	Soviet Union
KS-12/12a/18	85mm	Soviet Union
AZP S-60	57mm	Soviet Union
Type 59	57mm	China
Bofors L-70	40mm	Sweden
M1939	37mm	Soviet Union
Type 55	37mm	China
Oerlikon GDF	35mm	Switzerland
ZU-23-2	23mm	Soviet Union
Zastava M55	20mm	Yugoslavia
ZPU-4/ZPU-2	14.5mm	Soviet Union/Bulgaria
Type 56	14.5mm	China
MR-4	14.5mm	Romania

Air Bases of the Iraqi Air Force in January 1991. Captured air bases inside Kuwait are in Italics.

Though impressive on paper, the Iraqi Air Force's primary role was to act as a regional deterrent, with a secondary role of supporting the Iraqi Army, rather than attempt to gain air superiority in any conflict. Basic training was rigid, inflexible, and left pilots with extremely poor situational awareness. Additional training was provided by the Soviet Union. Iraqi Mirage pilots attended courses in France. Soviet trainers generally passed everyone, but assessed that less than half of the IQAF students would have been accepted into Soviet fighter units. French training, which the Iraqis considered decidedly superior to Soviet training, resulted in an 80% failure rate by Iraqi pilots. Nevertheless those who failed were qualified to fly upon return to Iraq.

In all, a third of Iraqi pilots were deemed to meet the standards of Western pilots, and almost all of them lacked aggressiveness and were overly dependent upon ground control to direct them to targets. The air force suffered from spare parts shortages and maintenance shortfalls, and a majority of their equipment like the MiG-21 were outdated and of dubious combat value. Only 170 aircraft like the MiG-29 and Mirage F1 were considered comparable to Coalition aircraft, with the Iraqi MiG-29s being downgraded export models.

The Kari air defence system had a number of deficiencies, of which Coalition air forces took advantage. The system was primarily oriented towards defending against much smaller attacks from Iraq's most likely enemies—Iran, Syria and Israel—and focused on point defense rather than area defense. This meant there were significant gaps in its coverage, particularly on the orientation from Saudi Arabia straight to Baghdad, and attacking aircraft would be able to approach their target from multiple directions.

Like its aircraft, much of Iraq's ground air defenses were outdated: SA-2 and SA-3 systems were nearing the end of their operational lifespan and their countermeasures were well-known at this point, while its other SAM systems were not much younger. Furthermore, the Integrated Air Defense System was centralized to a fault. Although each IOC was datalinked to their respective SOC and back to the ADOC, the defense sectors couldn't share information between each other. If a SOC was knocked out of action, the attached air defense weapons lost all ability to coordinate their response. Its respective SAM batteries were forced to rely on their own radar systems, while most AAA lacked any radar guidance.

== Main air campaign starts ==
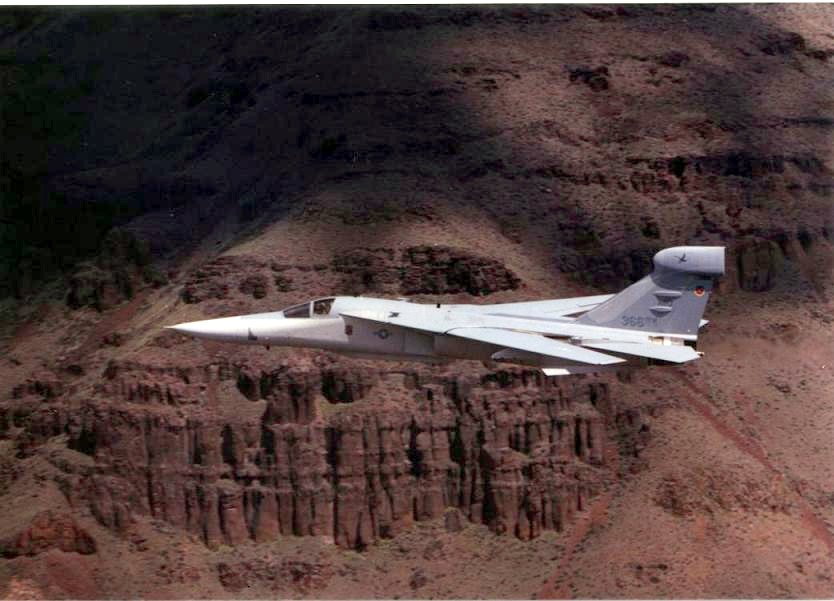
A EF-111 Raven

A day after the deadline set in United Nations Security Council Resolution 678, the coalition launched a massive air campaign. This began the general offensive codenamed Operation Desert Storm, with more than 1,000 sorties launching per day. It began on 17 January 1991, at 2:38 AM, Baghdad time, when Task Force Normandy, eight US Army AH-64 Apache helicopters led by four US Air Force MH-53 Pave Low helicopters, destroyed Iraqi radar sites near the Iraqi–Saudi Arabian border, which could have warned Iraq of an upcoming attack.

At 2:43 A.M. two USAF EF-111 Ravens with terrain following radar led 22 USAF F-15E Strike Eagles against assaults on airfields in Western Iraq. Minutes later, one of the EF-111 crews—Captain James Denton and Captain Brent Brandon—were unofficially credited with the destruction of an Iraqi Dassault Mirage F1, when their low altitude maneuvering led the F1 to crash into the ground.

At 3:00 AM, ten USAF F-117 Nighthawk stealth attack aircraft, under the protection of a three-ship formation of EF-111s, bombed the Iraqi capital, Baghdad. The striking force came under fire from 3,000 anti-aircraft guns on the ground. Within hours of the start of the coalition air campaign, a P-3 Orion called Outlaw Hunter, developed by the U.S. Navy's Space and Naval Warfare Systems Command, which was testing a highly specialised over-the-horizon radar, detected a large number of Iraqi patrol boats and naval vessels attempting to make a run from Basra and Umm Qasr to Iranian waters. Outlaw Hunter vectored in strike elements, which attacked the Iraqi naval flotilla near Bubiyan Island, destroying eleven vessels and damaging scores more.

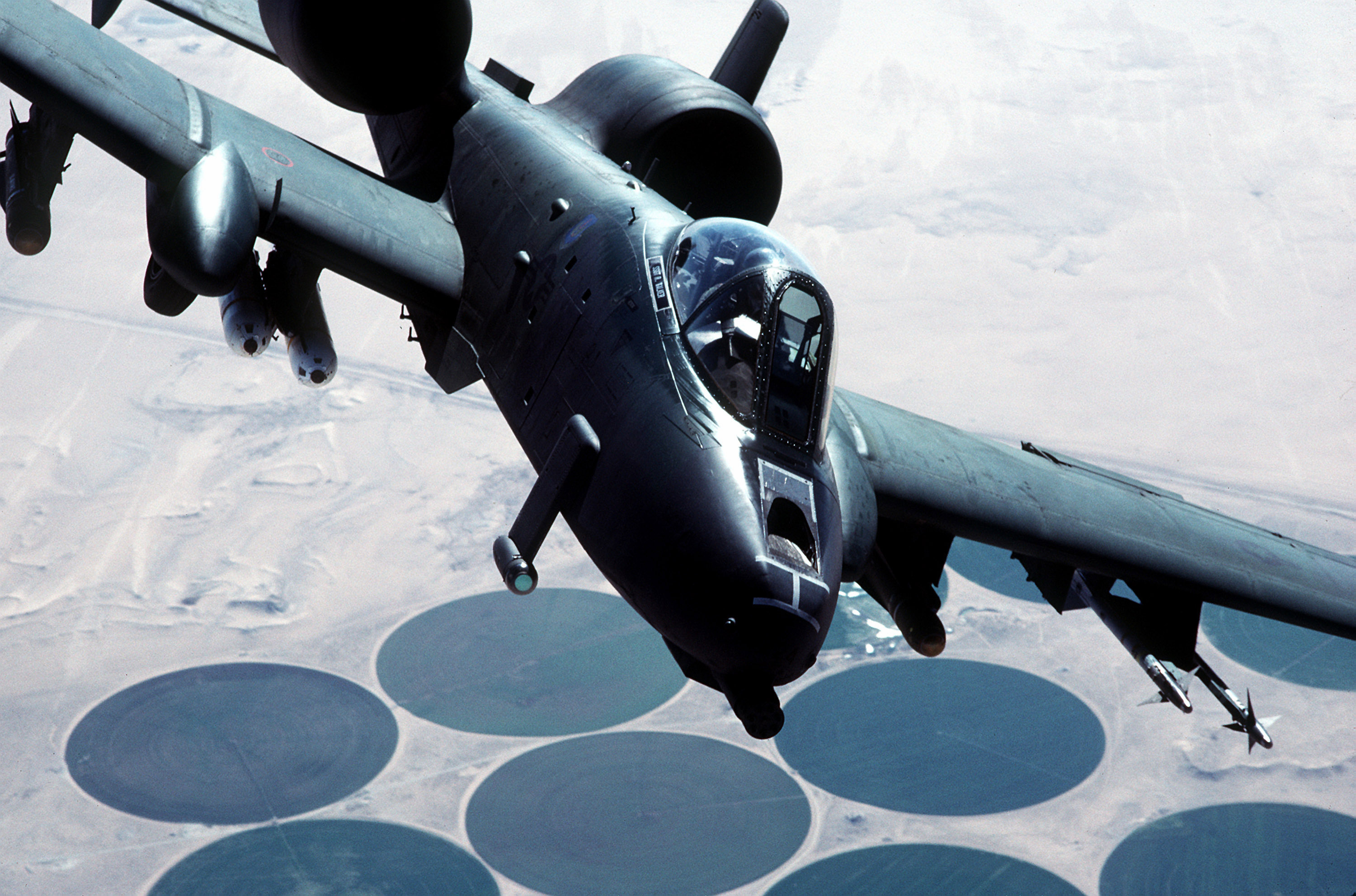
A USAF A-10A Thunderbolt-II ground attack aircraft flying over circles of irrigated crops during the air campaign

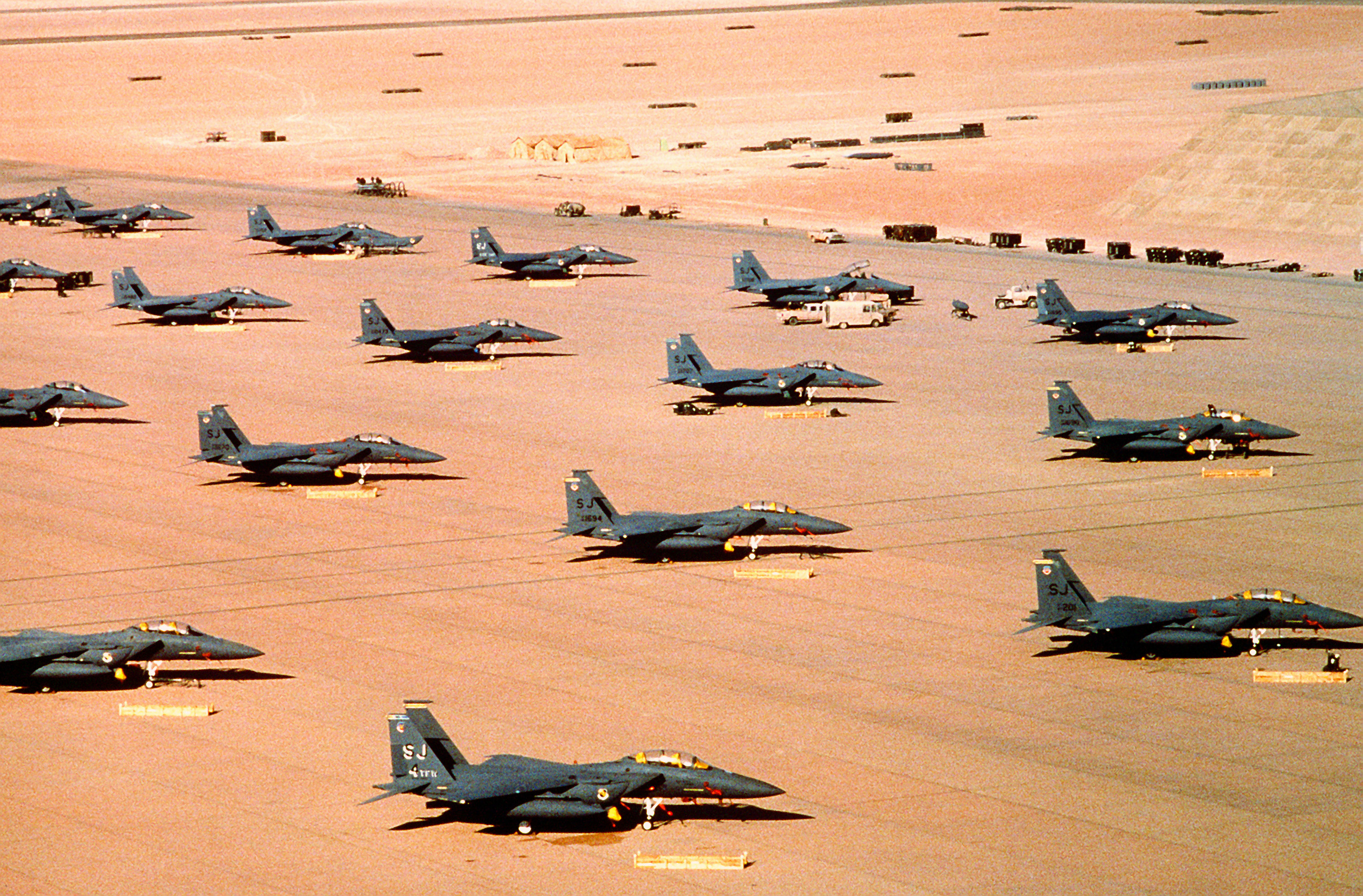
F-15E Strike Eagles parked at an airfield

Concurrently, U.S. Navy BGM-109 Tomahawk cruise missiles struck targets in Baghdad. Other coalition aircraft struck targets throughout Iraq. Government buildings, TV stations, airfields, presidential palaces, military installations, communication lines, supply bases, oil refineries, a Baghdad airport, electric powerplants and factories making Iraqi military equipment were all destroyed by massive aerial and missile attacks from coalition forces.

Five hours after the first attacks, Iraq's state radio broadcast a voice identified as Saddam Hussein declaring that "The great duel, the mother of all battles has begun. The dawn of victory nears as this great showdown begins."

The Gulf War is sometimes called the "computer war", due to the advanced computer-guided weapons and munitions used in the air campaign, which included precision-guided munitions and cruise missiles, even though these were in the minority when compared with the amount of "dumb bombs" used. Cluster munitions and BLU-82 "Daisy Cutters" were also used.

Iraq responded by launching eight Iraqi modified Scud missiles into Israel the next day. These missile attacks on Israel continued for the six weeks of the war.

On the first night of the war, two F/A-18s from the carrier USS Saratoga were flying outside of Baghdad when two Iraqi MiG-25s engaged them. In a beyond-visual-range (BVR) kill, an Iraqi MiG-25 piloted by Zuhair Dawood fired an R-40RD missile, shooting down an American F/A-18C Hornet and killing its pilot, Lieutenant Commander Scott Speicher.

In an effort to demonstrate their own air offensive capability, on 24 January the Iraqis attempted to mount a strike against the major Saudi oil refinery, Ras Tanura. Two Mirage F1 fighters laden with incendiary bombs and two MiG-23s acting as fighter cover took off from bases in Iraq. They were spotted by US AWACs, and two Royal Saudi Air Force F-15s were sent to intercept. When the Saudis appeared, the Iraqi MiGs turned tail, but the Mirages pressed on. Captain Iyad Al-Shamrani, one of the Saudi pilots, maneuvered his jet behind the Mirages and shot down both aircraft.

A few days later, the Iraqis made their last true air offensive of the war, unsuccessfully attempting to shoot down F-15s patrolling the Iranian border. After this episode, the Iraqis made no more air efforts of their own, sending most of their jets to Iran in hopes that they might someday get their air force back.

The first priority for Coalition forces was the destruction of Iraqi command and control bunkers, Scud missile launch pads and storage areas, telecommunications and radio facilities, and airfields. The attack began with a wave of deep-penetrating aircraft – F-111s, F-15Es, Tornado GR1s, F-16s, A-6s, A-7Es, and F-117s, complemented by F-15C, F-14s and Air Defense Tornados. EA-6Bs, EF-111 radar jammers, and F-117A stealth planes were heavily used in this phase to elude Iraq's extensive SAM systems and anti-aircraft weapons. The sorties were launched mostly from Saudi Arabia and the six Coalition aircraft carrier battle groups (CVBG) in the Persian Gulf and Red Sea. During the initial 24 hours, 2,775 sorties were flown, including seven B-52s which flew a 35-hour nonstop 14,000-mile round-trip from Barksdale Air Force Base and launched 35 AGM-86 CALCM cruise missiles against eight Iraqi targets.

The carrier battle groups operating in the Persian Gulf included the USS Midway, USS Theodore Roosevelt and USS Ranger. USS America, USS John F. Kennedy, and USS Saratoga operated from the Red Sea. USS America later transitioned to the Persian Gulf midway through the air war.

Wild Weasels were very effective. Unlike the North Vietnamese, Iraqi SAM operators did not turn their radar off until just before launch. Iraqi anti-aircraft defenses, including shoulder-launched ground-to-air missiles, were surprisingly ineffective against coalition aircraft. The coalition suffered only 75 aircraft losses in over 100,000 sorties. 42 of these losses were the result of Iraqi action. The other 33 were lost to accidents. In particular, RAF and US Navy aircraft which flew at low altitudes to avoid radar were particularly vulnerable. This changed when the aircrews were ordered to fly above the AAA.

The next coalition targets were command and communication facilities. Saddam Hussein had closely micromanaged the Iraqi forces in the Iran–Iraq War, and initiative at lower levels was discouraged. Coalition planners hoped that Iraqi resistance would quickly collapse if deprived of command and control.

== Iraq's air force units flight to Iran ==
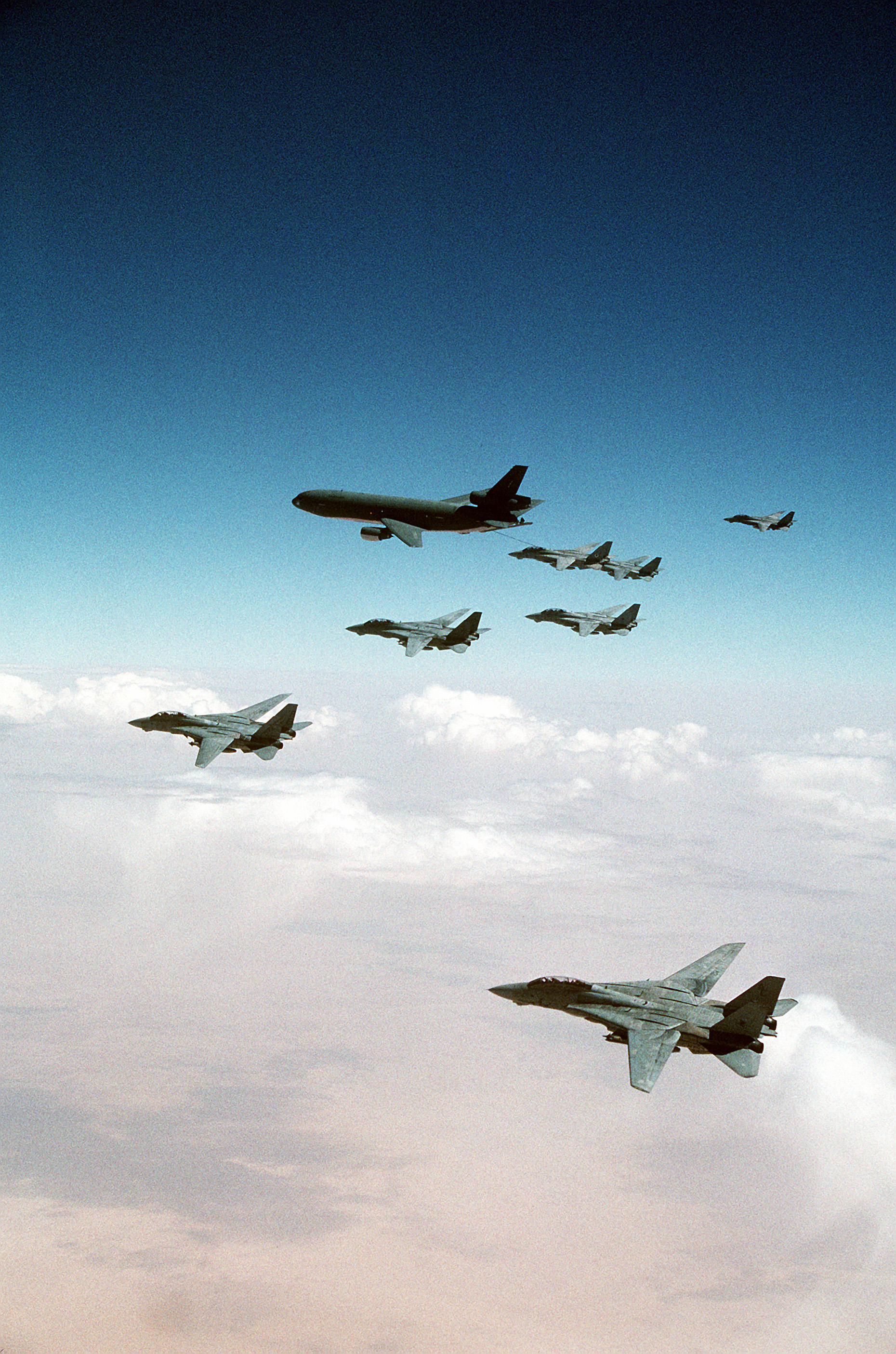
F-14 Tomcats from the Red Sea and Persian Gulf await their turn refueling from a KC-10A over Iraq during Desert Storm while conducting a combat air patrol mission to turn away fleeing Iraqi fighters.

The first week of the air war saw a few Iraqi sorties, but these did little damage, and 36 Iraqi fighter aircraft were shot down by Coalition planes. Soon after, the Iraqi Air Force began fleeing to Iran, with 115 to 140 aircraft flown there. This mass exodus of Iraqi aircraft took coalition forces by surprise, as the Coalition had been expecting them to flee to Jordan, a nation friendly to Iraq, rather than Iran, a long-time enemy. As the purpose of the war was to destroy Iraq militarily, the coalition placed aircraft over western Iraq to try to stop any retreat into Jordan. This meant they were unable to react before most of the Iraqi aircraft made it safely to Iranian airbases.

The coalition eventually established a virtual "wall" of F-15 Eagles, F-14 Tomcats, and F-16 Fighting Falcons on the Iraq–Iran border (called MIGCAP), stopping the exodus of fleeing Iraqi fighters. In response, the Iraqi Air Force launched Operation Samurra in an attempt to break the blockade imposed on them. The resulting air battle was the last offensive action of the war for the Iraqi Air Force.

It was unclear if there had been a formal agreement between Iraq and Iran, with some suggesting that the deal had been hastily drawn up, and initially only permitted sanctuary for Iraqi civilian and transport aircraft. Iran did not allow the Iraqi aircrews to be released until years later. Iran held on to the Iraqi aircraft for over 20 years, whose value was collectively estimated at $2.5 billion, as partial payment of $900 billion in reparations. Iran eventually returned 88 aircraft in 2014. However, many Iraqi planes remained in Iran, and several were destroyed by coalition forces.

== Infrastructure bombing ==
The third and largest phase of the air campaign targeted military targets throughout Iraq and Kuwait: Scud missile launchers, weapons research facilities, and naval forces. About one-third of the Coalition airpower was devoted to attacking Scuds, some of which were on trucks and therefore difficult to locate. Some U.S. and British special forces teams had been covertly inserted into western Iraq to aid in the search and destruction of Scuds. The lack of adequate terrain for concealment hindered their operations, and some of them were killed or captured, such as occurred with the widely publicised Bravo Two Zero patrol of the SAS.

=== Civilian infrastructure ===
Coalition bombing raids destroyed Iraqi civilian infrastructure. 11 of Iraq's 20 major power stations and 119 substations were totally destroyed, and a further six major power stations were damaged. At the end of the war, electricity production was at four percent of its pre-war levels. Nearly all Iraqi dams, most major pumping stations, and many sewage treatment plants, whether via deliberate bombing or lack of electricity, were rendered non-functional. Telecommunications equipment, port facilities, oil refineries and distribution, railroads and bridges were also destroyed as a result of Coalition bombing efforts.

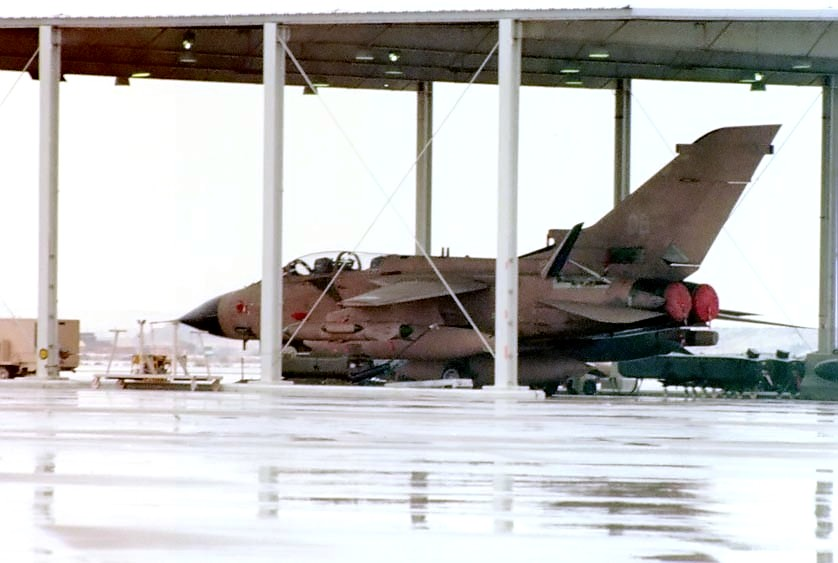
A Royal Air Force Panavia Tornado parked under an aircraft shelter

Iraqi targets were located by aerial photography and GPS coordinates. According to the non-fiction book, Armored Cav by Tom Clancy, in August 1990, a USAF senior officer arrived at Baghdad International Airport carrying a briefcase with a GPS receiver inside. After being taken to the U.S. embassy, he took a single GPS reading in the courtyard of the complex. Upon return to the U.S., the coordinates were used as the basis for designating targets in Baghdad.

Coalition forces bombed highways across the region, damaging road infrastructure and killing or injuring numerous civilians, many of whom were foreign nationals evacuating Iraq and Kuwait.

== Civilian casualties ==
The U.S. government claimed that Iraqi officials fabricated numerous attacks on Iraqi holy sites in order to rally the Muslim world to support Iraq during the conflict, pointing to Iraq's claim that Coalition forces had attacked the holy cities of Najaf and Karbala. At the end of the war, the estimated number of Iraqi civilians killed was 2,278 killed and 5,965 wounded.

On 13 February 1991, a United States Air Force (USAF) warplane fired two laser-guided missiles at an air raid shelter in the Al-A'amiriya neighborhood of Baghdad, killing at least 408 civilians sheltering there. U.S. officials subsequently claimed that the shelter also served as a communications center for the Iraqi military. BBC correspondent Jeremy Bowen, who was one of the first television reporters on the scene, was given access to the shelter and claimed that he did not find any evidence of it being used by the Iraqi military. His claims were later contradicted by Iraqi general Wafiq al-Samarrai, who claimed that the shelter was used by the Iraqi Intelligence Service, and that Saddam Hussein had personally made visits to it.

The day after the bombing of the shelter, a Royal Air Force (RAF) fighter jet fired two laser-guided missiles at a bridge in Fallujah, which was part of an Iraqi military supply line. The missiles malfunctioned and struck Fallujah's largest marketplace, which was situated in a residential area, killing between 50 and 150 non-combatants and wounding many more. After news of the mistake became public, an RAF spokesman, Group Captain David Henderson issued a statement noting that the missile had malfunctioned but admitted that the Royal Air Force had made an error.

== Losses ==
An estimated 407 Iraqi aircraft were either destroyed, or flown to Iran and permanently impounded there. During Desert Storm, 36 Iraqi aircraft were shot down in aerial combat. Three Iraqi helicopters and 2 fighters were shot down during the invasion of Kuwait on 2 August 1990. Kuwait claims to have shot down as many as 37 Iraqi aircraft. These claims have not been confirmed. 68 fixed wing Iraqi aircraft and 13 helicopters were destroyed while on the ground, and 137 aircraft were flown to Iran and never returned.

The Coalition lost 75 aircraft—52 fixed-wing aircraft and 23 helicopters–during Desert Storm, with 39 fixed-wing aircraft and 5 helicopters lost in combat. One coalition fighter was lost in air-air combat, a U.S. Navy F/A-18 piloted by Scott Speicher. Other Iraqi air to air claims surfaced over the years, all were disputed. One B-52G was lost while returning to its operating base on Diego Garcia, when it suffered a catastrophic electrical failure and crashed into the Indian Ocean, killing 3 of the 6 crew members on board.

The rest of the Coalition losses came from anti-aircraft fire. The Americans lost 28 fixed-wing aircraft and 15 helicopters; the British lost 7 fixed-wing aircraft; the Saudi Arabians lost 2; the Italians lost 1; and the Kuwaitis lost 1. During the Iraqi invasion of Kuwait on 2 August 1990, the Kuwaiti Air Force lost 12 fixed-wing aircraft, all destroyed on the ground. Kuwait lost 8 helicopters, with 6 shot down and 2 destroyed on the ground.

== See also ==
- Air engagements of the Gulf War
- Gulf War Air Power Survey
- List of Gulf War pilots by victories
- Operation Granby

== Bibliography ==
- Boyne, Walter J. (2003). The Influence of Air Power upon History. Pelican (www.pelicanpub.com). ISBN 1-58980-034-6.
- Clancy, Tom; Horner, Chuck (2000). Every Man a Tiger: The Gulf War Air Campaign. Berkley. ISBN 978-0-425-17292-6.
- de Guillebon, Hugues (May 2019). "Opération Fox: Les missions secrètes des F1 "Aggresseurs" (1)" [Operation Fox: The Secret Missions of the F1 Aggressors, Part 1]. Le Fana de l'Aviation (in French) (594): 16–27. ISSN 0757-4169.
- Micheletti, Eric (1991). Operation Daguet: French Air Force in the Gulf War. Hong Kong: Concord Publications. ISBN 962-361-022-X.
