= Kelk =

Kelk or KELK may refer to:

== People ==
- Jackie Kelk (1923–2002), American actor
- Jon K. Kelk (fl. from 1981), officer in the National Guard of the United States
- Lindsey Kelk (born 1980), British writer
- Kelk baronets, a title in the Baronetage of the United Kingdom
  - John Kelk, (1816–1886), 1st Baronet, British contractor and politician

== Places ==
- Kelk, East Riding of Yorkshire, England
  - Little Kelk
  - Great Kelk
- Kelk, Iranshahr, Iran

== Other uses ==
- KELK, an American radio station

== See also ==
- Kelč, Czech Republic
