= Air engagements of the Gulf War =

Persian Gulf War Air Combat
- Part of Persian Gulf War
| Date | Persian Gulf War; 17 January – 28 February 1991 (1 month, 1 week and 4 days); After Persian Gulf War; 28 February 1991 – 20 March 2003 (12 years, 2 weeks and 6 days) |
| Location | Iraq and Kuwait |
| Result | Coalition victory |

Belligerents
| United States; United Kingdom; Saudi Arabia | Iraq |

Commanders and leaders
| (United States) Chuck Horner (United States) Norman Schwarzkopf (United States) Colin Powell (United Kingdom) Andrew Wilson (United Kingdom) Bill Wratten (Saudi Arabia) Khalid bin Sultan (Saudi Arabia) Saleh Al-Muhaya | (Iraq) Saddam Hussein (Iraq) Ali Hassan al-Majid |

Strength
| 1,000+ aircraft | 750 aircraft |

Casualties and losses
| 1 F/A-18C and 1 MQ-1 confirmed lost, 1 pilot KIA. 1 RAF Tornado shot down, several other aircraft damaged (Iraqi claim). F-15 Eagle shot down (Iraqi Claim) F-15 Eagle damaged (US claim). 45 Kuwait aircraft shot down, 11 Saudi Arabia aircraft shot down, and USA UAVs and transport aircraft shot down. | 44+ aircraft shot down (in air-air combat varying on report) |

During the 1991 Gulf War and subsequent operations in no-fly zones over Iraq, Coalition air forces faced the Iraqi Air Force (IQAF), the fourth largest air force in the world at the time. In the opening days of the war, many air-to-air engagements occurred, between Iraqi interceptors and a variety of different Coalition aircraft.

== History ==
=== Persian Gulf War ===
==== 17 January 1991 ====
USN F/A-18Cs vs. IQAF MiG-25s

Shortly after the Coalition air campaign began, ten United States Navy F/A-18C Hornets from the carrier USS Saratoga were on a mission targeting Iraqi radars when the flight leader, Cdr. Mike Anderson, spotted what he believed to be an Iraqi MiG-25PD taking off. The MiG was piloted by Lt. Col. Zuhair Dawoud, who had been scrambled at 0238 hrs. to intercept the Hornet formation. Although Anderson was certain the aircraft he had seen climbing was hostile, the AWACS controller denied him permission to fire, as they were unable to verify that the aircraft was Iraqi. Anderson locked his radar onto Dawoud, who responded by executing a defensive turn.

The two circled one another as Anderson awaited firing clearance, but Dawoud shut off his jet's afterburners, causing Anderson to lose sight of him, and fled eastward. Dawoud then resumed his intercept, and from a distance of 29 km, fired an R-40 missile at the last F/A-18C in the formation, flown by Lt. Cdr. Scott Speicher. At 0250, the missile impacted Speicher's F/A-18C. Speicher ejected, but did not survive. Other members of Speicher's formation witnessed the explosion, but were unsure what had caused it. They later discovered Speicher and his aircraft to be missing, and deduced he had been shot down by the MiG.

USAF F-15C vs. IQAF MiG-29

On the opening night of the war, United States Air Force (USAF) F-15C Eagles were tasked with sweeping for Iraqi fighters, forming a protective wall for coalition aircraft that were leaving Iraqi airspace. Two 58th Tactical Fighter Squadron four-ship flights took part, under the callsigns 'Citgo' and 'Penzoil'. The latter flight consisted of Capts. Rick “Kluso” Tollini, Larry Pitts, Jon Kelk, and Mark Williams. At roughly 0305 hrs., AWACS alerted the F-15 flights, still forming over Saudi Arabia, that Iraqi fighters were airborne. The F-15s pushed northward, and were vectored towards Iraqi fighters.

As he flew farther into Iraqi airspace, Kelk detected a contact on radar, about 35 miles from him. The contact locked onto Kelk. Once Kelk was able to verify that the contact was an enemy, he launched an AIM-7 Sparrow missile, and performed evasive maneuvers while releasing chaff to confuse the enemy radar. As the two aircraft closed to 10 miles, Kelk observed a purple-white flash of light that lasted a few seconds. Intelligence later concluded Kelk had shot down an Iraqi MiG-29. He thus became the first American pilot credited with a kill in the F-15.

USAF F-15Cs, EF-111A vs. IQAF Mirage F1s

'Citgo' flight was tasked with patrolling for Iraqi fighters in the vicinity of Mudaysis Air Base, as well as H-2 and H-3 airfields. The flight leader, Capt. Rob Graeter, noticed three aircraft taking off and climbing as he approached Mudaysis. Graeter descended from his altitude of 30,000 ft. to the mid-20,000s. Once he verified the identity of one of the contacts, he fired an AIM-7, from a distance of about 10 miles. He saw the missile detonate and bring down the Iraqi jet, a Mirage F1, and saw the wreckage hit the ground. Shortly thereafter, while looking for another Mirage, he saw another aircraft hit the ground and explode.

At roughly the same time, a USAF EF-111A Raven "Spark Vark", flown by pilot Captain James Denton and Electronic Warfare Officer (EWO) Captain Brent Brandon, was on an electronic warfare mission ahead of a group of jets on a bombing run. They passed between H-2 and H-3 airfields. An Iraqi Mirage pursued them, and as Denton performed an evasive turn to the left, Brandon spotted an incoming missile. Denton reversed to the right, dispensing chaff and causing the missile to miss.

As they flew close to the desert floor, the Raven crew claim they saw the Mirage crash, ahead of them and to the right. Denton and Brandon were awarded the Distinguished Flying Cross. Their account is disputed, because one Al-Jabbouri, a Mirage F1 pilot confirmed to be alive just before the Iraq War of 2003, claimed an EF-111 crashed into the ground while attempting to evade a missile he had fired.

Some sources believe the explosion the Raven crew saw was the second Mirage Graeter had seen go down, but in an interview for F-15C Units in Combat, Graeter did not remember any EF-111s being in the area. He was credited with a second kill. Both the American and the Iraqi accounts of the engagement between the EF-111 and the Mirage were disputed by an article in the publication "War is Boring".

Meanwhile, Capt. Steve Tate led 'Quaker' flight, a group of four F-15Cs protecting strike aircraft in the east. While he and his wingman were patrolling at 10,000 ft. around Al Jawah Air Base, Tate detected an aircraft about 16 miles from him. As he closed to 12 miles, Tate verified the contact was an Iraqi F1, and launched an AIM-7. The Mirage did not maneuver, and Tate saw the Mirage explode and burning wreckage falling.

USAF F-15Es vs IQAF MiG-29s

On the opening night of the war two Iraqi MiG-29s attempted to engage a flight of USAF F-15E Strike Eagles. One of the MiGs crashed while flying at low altitude but the other MiG pressed on. One of the F-15Es fired an AIM-9 Sidewinder when the MiG locked him up but missed. Several other F-15Es simultaneously tried to engage the lone MiG-29 but were unable to get the kill. One F-15E was actually flying past the Iraqi jet and maneuvered in for the kill but the pilot hesitated to take the shot because he was unsure of his wingmen's location and because he did not get a good tone from the Sidewinder missile.

USAF F-15Cs vs. IQAF MiG-25s

Two IQAF MiG-25s fired missiles at a group of F-15Cs escorting a bombing run in Iraq. The F-15Cs evaded the missiles and gave chase, but were forced to give up when the MiGs outran them. They had fired a total of ten missiles at the MiGs.

USAF F-111s vs. IQAF MiG-23

An Iraqi MiG-23 fired a R-24T missile at an F-111 Aardvark on a bombing run and scored a hit, although the bomber made it safely back to base. Another similar incident occurred with the same Iraqi interceptor several minutes later, this F-111 also made it back to base despite the severe damage to the aircraft. This is Iraq's only success of the Gulf War using MiG-23s.

USN F/A-18s vs. IQAF MiG-21s

Four F/A-18Cs from VFA-81 'Sunliners' were on a mission to strike H3 airfield. While en route, an E-2C Hawkeye AEW aircraft alerted them to the presence of two Iraqi MiG-21s. Lt. Cdr. Mark Fox quickly locked on to one of the MiGs, and launched an AIM-9 Sidewinder. Fox lost sight of the missile, and followed with an AIM-7. The AIM-9 brought down the MiG, with the AIM-7 hitting the falling wreckage. Piloting another of the F/A-18s was Nick Mongillo, who downed the other MiG with an AIM-7. In forty seconds, the F/A-18s had shot down both MiGs without jettisoning their bombs.

USAF F-15Cs vs. IQAF MiG-29s

On the afternoon of January 17, a large USAF strike package was launched to hit Iraqi airfields and a chemical and biological warfare research facility. Capt. Chuck Magill, a pilot on exchange from the United States Marine Corps, led a group of F-15Cs to protect the strike force. After they entered Iraqi airspace, Magill's flight was informed of two Iraqi MiG-29s patrolling at low altitude and speed, southwest of the target area. As they closed to about 40 miles of the MiGs, Iraqi surface-to-air missiles (SAM) fired at the F-15s, disrupting the F-15s' pursuit, but hitting none of them.

As the F-15s closed in, the MiGs climbed and accelerated towards them. Because the MiGs were closely spaced, the F-15 pilots had difficulty sorting them. As a result, Capt. Rhory Draeger fired an AIM-7 at the MiG on the opposite side from him, and crossed over Magill's jet. Magill fired an AIM-7 at the other MiG, but the missile appeared to be off-course, so he followed with a second missile. As they closed to 7 miles, the F-15 pilots sighted the MiGs. Draeger's missile hit its target in the cockpit. Magill's first missile hit the other MiG from below, in the wing area, and the second hit the falling wreckage.

==== 19 January 1991 ====
USAF F-15Cs vs. IQAF MiG-25s

Capt. Rick “Kluso” Tollini led a flight of F-15s assigned to protect USAF F-15Es, with the same wingmen he had flown with on 17 January. As the flight refueled from a tanker, AWACS warned them of Iraqi fighters 60 miles north of them. As the F-15s closed in on a pair of MiG-29s, they detected two more Iraqi planes farther north, trailing the first group. Tollini suspected the Iraqis were laying a trap. As the first group flew away, his flight attempted to engage the second flight, consisting of two MiG-25s.

As Tollini and Capt. Kelk locked on to the two MiG-25s, at around 30 miles distance, the MiGs immediately turned and descended, and the F-15 pilots lost track of them completely. Eventually, Pitts spotted one of the MiGs flying at low altitude from his left to right. He performed a split-S turn, putting him behind the MiG, and enduring 12 Gs in the process. With Pitts' F-15 close behind, the Iraqi pilot began turning. Pitts expended several missiles before finally bringing down the MiG with an AIM-7.

Meanwhile, Capt. Williams located the second MiG, 8 miles south of the F-15s. Tollini positioned himself behind the aircraft but was unsure whether it was the MiG, or an F-15. Noticing the aircraft's afterburner flame, Tollini ordered the other members of his flight to shut their afterburners off. The aircraft in front of Tollini did not do so, and seeing the missile pylons under its wings, he became certain it was the MiG. He launched an AIM-7 which exploded underneath the MiG, and caused it to disintegrate.

RAF Tornado GR.1 vs. IQAF MiG-29

It has been claimed by some sources that a Royal Air Force Tornado GR1 (ZA467) crewed by Squadron Leaders Gary Lennox and Adrian Weeks was shot down on 19 January by an R-60MK (NATO reporting name: AA-8 Aphid) missile fired from an Iraqi MiG-29 piloted by Jameel Sayhood, however this aircraft is officially recorded as having crashed on 22 January on a mission to Ar Rutbah.

USAF F-15Cs vs. IQAF MiG-29s

As coalition strike aircraft flew back towards Saudi Arabia, they requested fighter support to ensure Iraqi aircraft did not pursue them. As Tollini’s flight was also returning to base, the task fell to a flight of F-15s led by Capt. Cesar Rodriguez, protecting AWACS and tanker aircraft over Saudi airspace. Rodriguez and Capt. Craig Underhill split off from the group, and flew into Iraq. They detected two MiG-29s in the vicinity of H-2 airfield, but the MiGs broke away from the F-15s, apparently trying to lure them towards SAMs around Baghdad.

The F-15s turned away from the SAM threat, but AWACS called out another contact 13 miles from them. The F-15s turned to meet the threat, which locked onto Rodriguez’s aircraft. Underhill, with the help of a SIGINT aircraft, identified the aircraft as a MiG-29, as Rodriguez performed evasive maneuvers and dispensed chaff. Underhill launched an AIM-7. Rodriguez, now 4 miles from the MiG, saw the missile pass over his jet, and destroy the MiG.

Unbeknownst to the F-15 pilots, another MiG-29 had been trailing few miles behind the first. As Rodriguez and Underhill sought to refuel from a tanker, AWACS called out the second MiG, 10 miles to their north and directly behind them. Underhill’s radar mistakenly identified the contact as a friendly, forcing the F-15 pilots to get closer to visually identify it. As the MiG made a series of turns, Rodriguez flew directly towards the contact, while Underhill climbed.

As Rodriguez passed the aircraft, he recognized it as an Iraqi MiG-29, and both he and the MiG broke left. Underhill continued flying overhead, seeking an opportunity to re-engage. Rodriguez gained a slight advantage, but was unable to get into position to employ his weapons. The two aircraft descended to very low altitude, forcing the MiG pilot to make a desperate move to escape; he began a split s maneuver, but was unable to pull out before hitting the ground.

USAF F-15Cs vs. IQAF Mirage F1s

In the early afternoon, two flights of four F-15Cs, using callsigns 'Rambo' and 'Conan', flying out of Incirlik Air Base, Turkey were conducting a fighter sweep ahead of an F-16 Fighting Falcon strike package against targets in Kirkuk. As they proceeded south in a wall formation, AWACS alerted them to two Iraqi aircraft, later identified as Mirage F1s, patrolling west of Kirkuk. As the Iraqi jets flew westward, the F-15s turned to engage them. The maneuver put Capt. David Prather and Lt. David Sveden, nos. 3 and 4 in 'Rambo' flight respectively, closest to the Mirages.

The Iraqis reversed course, and headed towards the F-15s. As they closed in, Prather and Sveden fired AIM-7s. Prather's missile malfunctioned, and he followed with a second shot from 8 miles, then another from 7 miles. Sveden's target turned northward, but as Sveden closed to 4 miles, it reversed back towards him. Sveden fired a second AIM-7. His first missile detonated, ripping the tail section off the Mirage and sent it tumbling to the ground. The second missile hit the falling aircraft. At roughly the same time, Prather's missiles brought down the second Mirage. Neither Iraqi pilot ejected.

==== 24 January 1991 ====
===== RSAF F-15C vs. IQAF Mirage F1s =====
Four Iraqi Mirage F-1s took off from al-Kut Air Base, with the goal of striking oil facilities in Dhahran, Saudi Arabia. After refueling in mid-air, two of the Mirages headed towards the gulf. They disguised their intentions by following a U.S. Navy strike formation, and using egress points that Coalition aircraft had been using. A Navy E-2C and Navy ships spotted the Iraqi planes, but could not identify them.

Concern grew when the Mirages turned south and gained speed. No U.S. Navy or USAF aircraft were in a position to intercept them. AWACS directed two pairs of Royal Saudi Air Force F-15s to intercept. The second pair, led by Capt. Ayedh al Shamrani, pursued the Iraqis. Al-Shamrani positioned himself behind the Mirages, and shot both down with AIM-9s. He then made an emergency landing at Dhahran, due to low fuel.

==== 26 January 1991 ====
===== USAF F-15Cs vs. IQAF MiG-23s =====
On January 26, Iraqi president Saddam Hussein ordered a number of Iraqi Air Force aircraft to fly to neighbouring Iran. Because some aircraft were too short-ranged to reach Iran in one flight, they would first need to fly to other Iraqi airfields closer to Iran.

In mid-afternoon, two flights of four MiG-23 MLs of No. 73 Squadron left Sa’ad Airbase (H-2) for al-Bakr Air Base. USAF AWACS detected the first group of MiGs, and alerted ‘CITGO’ flight, four F-15s led by Capt. Draeger, patrolling near the Saudi border. He was accompanied by Capts. Tony Schiavi, Rodriguez, and Bruce Till. The F-15s flew to intercept the MiGs, which were flying east-northeast, but could not locate them. AWACS called out a second group flying out of H-2.

The F-15s turned west towards the second group, about 80 miles from them. This group of MiGs was led by Maj. Shaker Rehan Hamood, with Capts. Karim Hassan Rahel and Amer Hassan, and an unnamed pilot, who returned to base with a mechanical problem. The remaining three MiGs continued flying at very low altitude, with two abreast and another trailing.

Initially, the F-15 pilots did not lock their radars onto the MiGs, to avoid alerting the Iraqis to their presence. With the F-15s closing down on the MiGs at supersonic speed, Draeger assigned targets, and when they had closed to 18 miles, the F-15s acquired the MiGs. Draeger fired at the leader, while Schiavi fired at the trailer, and Rodriguez and Till took the southernmost MiG.

About 10 miles from the MiGs, the F-15s flew through a break in the clouds and spotted the Iraqi aircraft. Draeger’s missile struck the lead MiG, which turned, caught fire, and flew a short distance before exploding and crashing. The remaining two MiGs turned towards the F-15s, and the missiles fired by Schiavi and Rodriguez destroyed them. Till’s missile passed by the falling wreckage of the last MiG. Thus, only Draeger, Schiavi, and Rodriguez were awarded kills.

Allegedly, an unnamed Iraqi pilot later claimed that Capt. Hassan survived the engagement, and reached al-Bakr safely.

==== 27 January 1991 ====
===== USAF F-15Cs vs. IQAF MiG-23s and Mirage F1 =====
In the late morning, three Iraqi MiG-23BNs and a Mirage F1 took off, headed for al-Bakr. USAF AWACS detected them, and vectored F-15s piloted by Capts. Jay Denney and Benjamin Powell towards them. Iraqi ground control warned the MiGs of the approaching danger, and the Iraqi aircraft split into two pairs, one western and one eastern. Denney and Powell each fired an AIM-7, neither of which brought down their intended targets. Denney's missile however exploded near the MiG, which began a turn. Denney followed with an AIM-9 which struck the cockpit of the MiG. Powell dropped behind the extremely low-flying western pair, and fired two AIM-7s, downing the Mirage and a MiG. Denney closed to about 8,000 feet behind the last MiG, and shot it down with an AIM-9.

==== 28 January 1991 ====
===== USAF F-15C vs. IQAF MiG-23 =====
A flight of F-15Cs from the 32nd TFS was taking over the patrol blocking flights to Iran when two Iraqi MiG-23 attempted to flee in the direction of the border. Initially, the F-15 pilots believed the MiGs to be side-by-side, heading south; in reality, one was trailing the other. As a result, the F-15 pilots waited too long to turn, and ended up behind the MiGs instead of cutting them off. One of the F-15 pilots, Capt. Donald Watrous jettisoned his drop tanks above the recommended maximum speed for doing so, and suffered damage to both wings, though he didn't notice at the time. Watrous then positioned himself to shoot down one of the MiGs. Three of his AIM-7s failed to ignite, but the fourth downed the MiG.

==== 29 January 1991 ====
===== USAF F-15C vs. IQAF MiG-23 =====
USAF Capt. David Rose shot down an Iraqi MiG-23 with an AIM-7.

==== 30 January 1991 ====
===== USAF F-15Cs vs. IQAF Mig-25s =====
Two MiG-25s engaged four F-15C in Samurra Air Battle. Capt. Qassim Ar Sammarai piloting one MiG-25 fired an R-40 missile which according to the USAF damaged the left engine of an F-15C. According to IQAF the two aircraft were shot down and crashed in Saudi Arabia, after Bedouin smugglers reportedly found the wreckage near the site where Iraqi radars lost the track of them.

==== 2 February 1991 ====
===== USAF F-15C vs. IQAF IL-76 =====
On 2 February, Capt. Greg Masters led a group of F-15s patrolling between Kirkuk and the Iranian border, ahead of an F-16 strike package. One of Masters' wingmen detected an aircraft flying at 4,000 ft., and the F-15s gave chase. Masters launched an AIM-7 from a few miles behind the aircraft. Due to cloud cover, neither he or his wingmen observed any explosion, but the contact disappeared from radar. This account was obtained from a diary entry by Masters. At the time he wrote the entry, the kill was unconfirmed. Other sources credit Masters with having shot down an Iraqi Il-76.

==== 6 February 1991 ====
===== USAF F-15C vs. IQAF MiG-21s and Su-25s =====
Four F-15s were patrolling near the Iranian border when AWACS alerted them to the presence of Iraqi aircraft flying at low altitude towards Iran. While two of the F-15s were refueling, Capt. Thomas Dietz and Lt. Bob Hehemann engaged the four Iraqi aircraft, consisting of two Su-25s and two MiG-21s. Diving at the MiGs, Dietz fired an AIM-7, but missed. He then maneuvered behind them and downed them with AIM-9s, while Hehemann downed the Su-25s, also with AIM-9s. The four Iraqi planes were shot down in the span of a few seconds.

===== USAF A-10A vs. IQAF Bo-105 =====
A USAF A-10 Thunderbolt II ground attack aircraft, piloted by Captain Robert Swain shot down an Iraqi Bo-105 helicopter using its GAU-8 30mm cannon. Swain fired approximately 75 rounds with his cannon on his first pass. He then fired approximately 300 rounds on his second pass, causing the helicopter to explode. It is the first air-to-air victory recorded by an A-10. It earned Swain and his aircraft the nickname "Chopper Popper." The aircraft is now on display at the United States Air Force Academy in Colorado Springs, Colorado.

==== 7 February 1991 ====
===== USN F-14 vs. IQAF Mi-8 =====
A U.S. Navy F-14 Tomcat shot down an IQAF Mi-8 helicopter with an AIM-9 missile. It was the last U.S. Navy F-14 air-to-air kill.

==== USAF F-15Cs vs. IQAF Su-22s and Su-7 ====
Two USAF F-15Cs shot down two IQAF Su-22s and one Su-7 as they attempted to flee Iraq. All with AIM-7 missiles.

==== USAF F-15C vs. IQAF Mil-24 ====
F-15 pilot Maj. Randy May claimed to have shot down an Iraqi Mi-24 Hind, using two AIM-7s fired from over 10 miles away. May's wingman attested to having seen the helicopter go down. Others have cast doubt on May's claim, saying he fired through cloud cover, and that neither May nor his wingman were able to see what he fired at. No other evidence has been found to substantiate May's claim. There are rumors that a missile may in fact have hit a car as it drove down a highway below.

==== 11 February 1991 ====
===== USAF F-15Cs vs. Unknown IQAF helicopter =====
USAF F-15 pilots Capts. Steve Dingy and Mark McKenzie shot down an unknown Iraqi helicopter, possibly an Mi-8, Aerospatiale Puma, or Sikorsky S-61, using AIM-7s. It was impossible to determine whose missile impacted the helo first, so the pilots shared credit for the kill.

==== 14 February 1991 ====
===== USAF F-15E vs. IQAF Mi-24 Hind =====
F-15E Strike Eagle call sign Packard 41 from the 335th Fighter Squadron with Capt. Richard “TB” Bennett as pilot and Capt. Dan “Chewie” Bakke as Weapons Systems Officer . The Strike Eagle was on a Scud hunting patrol when a AEW&C orders them to intercept three Iraqi Mi-24 Hinds that are dismounting troops were American special forces are operating at. when the F-15 got there. they target one of the helicopters that was on the ground with a laser targeting pod and used a 2000-lb GBU-10 Paveway II to try to hit it. then the Iraqi Hind lifts off the ground when the F-15 release the Paveway II. the F-15 continue to keep the laser on target and the bomb hits the Mi-24 in mid air. disintegrating the helicopter in the process. the special forces team on the ground witnessed the event

For some reason the original source in this wiki listed a MD Helicopters MD 500 instead of a Mil Mi-24.

==== 15 February 1991 ====
===== USAF A-10A vs. IQAF Mi-8 =====
An A-10A ground attack aircraft (serno. 81-0964 bearing nose art with a nod to the band The Grateful Dead's "Steal Your Face" album art & now nicknamed "MiL Killer") from the 511th TFS "Vultures" / 10th TFW, attached to the 354th FW Provisional, and piloted by Captain Todd "Shanghai" Sheehy, shot down an Iraqi Mi-8 helicopter with its GAU-8 "Avenger" 30mm cannon. On the first pass of two, attempts were made to secure an AIM-9M lock but due to high dive angle and the heat of the desert sand, a lock was not achieved. Capt. Sheehy employed the gun, hitting the attack helicopter in the tail boom section before extending and making a second pass with the gun, which sent the helicopter cartwheeling across the desert floor in a fireball. Capt. Sheehy destroyed an Iraqi SU-7 "Fitter" aircraft on the ground with cannon fire from the GAU-8, immediately prior to this engagement.

=== Post Persian Gulf War ===
==== 20 March 1991 ====
USAF F-15C vs. IQAF Su-22

Following the February 28 ceasefire, USAF F-15s continued to patrol Iraqi airspace. On 20 March, an F-15 flown by Capt. John Doneski shot down an Iraqi Su-22 near Tikrit, firing an AIM-9 from behind the Iraqi jet. A second Su-22 then landed at Tikrit Air Base.

==== 22 March 1991 ====
USAF F-15Cs vs. IQAF Su-22, PC-9

On 22 March, Capt. Dietz and Lt. Hehemann were patrolling over Iraqi airspace when they detected two contacts on radar. The airspeed of the contacts indicated they were not helicopters, prompting Dietz and Hehemann to approach and visually identify them. Dietz positioned himself close behind one of the unidentified aircraft, while Hehemann pursued the other contact. Dietz recognized the aircraft as an Iraqi fighter, and shot it down. Hehemann discovered the other aircraft to be a Pilatus PC-9 turboprop which the rules of engagement prohibited him from shooting down. The pilot of the turboprop spontaneously ejected. The PC-9 had been acting as a spotter for the Su-22, which had been attacking Kurdish civilians.

==== 27 December 1992 ====
USAF F-16 vs. IQAF MiG-25

On the morning of 27 December 1992, Iraqi MiG-25s repeatedly penetrated the southern no-fly zone, south of the 32nd parallel. A flight of USAF F-16s, led by Capt. Gary North, was conducting a patrol as part of Operation Southern Watch when a MiG-25 crossed the parallel to their west, and proceeded towards North's flight. The F-16s maneuvered to trap the Iraqi fighter in the no-fly zone. Once he visually identified the MiG and received firing clearance, North launched an AIM-120 AMRAAM from about 3NM, and downed the MiG. This was the first kill with an AIM-120, and also the first by a USAF F-16.

==== 17 January 1993 ====
USAF F-16 vs. IQAF MiG-23

On the morning of 17 January 1993, a USAF F-16C piloted by 1Lt. Craig Stevenson was flying a SEAD mission alongside an F-4G Wild Weasel when an Iraqi MiG-23 approached the northern no-fly zone. Stevenson turned to meet the threat, and put himself below the MiG to mitigate the threat of the MiG's radar-guided weapons. The MiG reached supersonic speed and crossed into the no-fly zone, and AWACS cleared Stevenson to shoot it down. As Stevenson closed in, the MiG abruptly reversed course, putting Stevenson in a trailing position about 5 miles behind it.

Stevenson pursued the MiG, while the F-4 monitored nearby SAM threats. The MiG began to turn back toward Stevenson, putting it within range of the F-16's AMRAAMs. When Stevenson's first missile failed to launch, he selected the one on the opposite wing, and fired. Once the missile began tracking the MiG independently, Stevenson turned to avoid nearby SAMs. As the MiG continued to turn, the missile detonated, bringing it down in a fireball.

USAF F-16s vs. IQAF Su-22s

Two IQAF Su-22 Fitters open fire on two USAF F-16s in protest of the no-fly zones. No aircraft are damaged in the encounter.

==== 14 April 1994 ====
USAF F-15 pilots Capt. Eric Wickson and Lt Col. Randy May mistook two U.S. Army UH-60 Black Hawks for Iraqi helicopters, and shot them down over the northern Iraq no-fly zone. All 26 people aboard the two helicopters died. AWACS had not informed the F-15 pilots of the presence of the Black Hawks, and their IFF equipment had not identified the helicopters as friendly. Once in visual range, Wickson and May mistook the Black Hawks for Iraqi Mi-24s, and shot them down.

==== Late 1990s and 2002 ====
Following Desert Storm, two no-fly zones over Iraq were set up, and enforced typically by U.S. and British aircraft. In one incident, an attack on up to 600 Kurdish refugees by Iraqi helicopters at Chamchamal, northern Iraq, was observed by a flight of F-15Es. As they were not allowed to open fire, the F-15Es instead conducted several high speed passes as close as possible to the Iraqi helicopters to create severe wake-turbulence, while aiming lasers at the helicopter's cockpits to attempt to blind their crews. This caused the crash of one Hind. Afterwards, USAF leadership ordered F-15Es not to fly below 10,000 feet (3,000 m) to avoid a repeat incident.

==== 5 January 1999 ====
USAF F-15Cs and USN F-14Ds vs. IQAF MiG-25s

A group of four Iraqi MiG-25s crossed the no-fly zones and sparked a dogfight with two patrolling F-15Cs and two patrolling F-14Ds. A total of six missiles were fired at the MiGs, none of which hit them. The MiGs then flew away.

==== 9 September 1999 ====
USN F-14 vs IQAF MiG-23

A lone MiG-23 crossed the no-fly zone heading towards a flight of F-14s. One F-14 fired an AIM-54 Phoenix at the MiG but missed and the MiG headed back north.

==== 23 December 2002 ====
USAF RQ-1 Predator vs. IQAF MiG-25

In what was the last aerial victory for the Iraqi Air Force before Operation Iraqi Freedom, an Iraqi MiG-25 destroyed an American UAV RQ-1 Predator after the drone opened fire on the Iraqi aircraft with a Stinger missile.

== See also ==
- List of Gulf War Pilots by Victories
