= Attack on Ras Tanura =

Attempted aerial bombing in Saudi Arabia

- Part of the air campaign of the Persian Gulf War
Date	24 January 1991
Location	Ras Tanura, Saudi Arabia
Result	Coalition victory

Belligerents
Saudi Arabia	Iraq

Commanders and leaders
(Saudi Arabia) Capt. Iyad Al-Shamrani	(Iraq) Maj. Ali Hussein Fadel †

Strength
2 RSAF F-15Cs; Several USMC Harriers	2 MiG-23s; 2 Mirage F1s

Casualties and losses
None	2 killed 2 Mirage F1s shot down

The attack on Ras Tanura was an attempted aerial bombing of the Ras Tanura oil production facility in Saudi Arabia during the Gulf War. Employing Dassault Mirage F1 fighters loaded with incendiary bombs, and two Mikoyan-Gurevich MiG-23s as fighter cover, Iraq intended to demonstrate to the coalition that it was capable of offensive air actions. Although the aircraft penetrated well into Saudi airspace due to skilled flying and luck, both bombers were shot down before they could reach their target by a McDonnell Douglas F-15C Eagle of the Royal Saudi Air Force after their fighter cover fled.

This was the only major instance during the war that the Iraqi Air Force attempted an offensive air operation outside of Iraq. Offensive air operations by Iraq would cease nearly entirely six days later after a last ditch operation to shoot down coalition F-15s.

== Prelude ==
Between September and November 1990, Iraqi Air Force planners realised that they had a severe disadvantage against the growing Coalition air forces that they would be facing. As a result, they planned several daring missions to consider attempting against Coalition forces. Among them was a plan to sink an aircraft carrier, a plan to bomb the anticipated amphibious assault by the U.S. Marine Corps (USMC) in Kuwait, and a plan for a deep strike into Saudi Arabia in order to take out Coalition military leaders. Almost all of these missions had extremely high projected attrition rates for Iraqi pilots (sinking an aircraft carrier was planned to take 34 aircraft, of which only 12 would reach the carrier, and none would return)

Among them was a plan to bomb the Ras Tanura Oil Production facility, which was responsible for approximately 7 million barrels of oil daily. For comparison, the entire country of Kuwait produced around 1.5 million barrels of oil a day, which alone caused oil prices around the world to double after the Iraqi invasion. This was the only operation of all those planned that was attempted, although their plan to attack landing Marines was on call and ready to go at a moments notice should they ever have attempted the amphibious invasion. Unbeknownst to the Iraqis, it was a planned farce.

== Planning ==
On 22 January, Iraqi leadership ordered the mission profile to attack Ras Tanura to be updated and executed. The planned date for the attack was 23 of January. In light of the ongoing war, Iraqi planners changed the mission profile several ways in order to improve their odds of success against Coalition air power. The main change was the entire mission was going to be conducted from an altitude of approximately 30-50m, at speeds of around 580 mph. It was hoped that this would allow the Iraqi jets to enter Saudi airspace nearly undetected, or at least detected too late to stop the attack.

Iraqi Mirage F1s were in fact F1EQ-4 variants loaded for the mission with two 400-kg bombs, a Remora radar jamming pod and a Sycomore chaff/flare dispenser. Their departure was planned for early morning on 23 January when U.S. jets bombed the airfield and destroyed two of the aircraft assigned to the mission. After prepping two more aircraft, another bombing raid later the same day destroyed another one. In addition, power was knocked out to the airfield temporarily, causing one of the aircraft to be trapped inside its hangar. The mission was delayed until 24 January. However, it was pushed back again due to delays in clearing cluster bombs around the aircraft hangars. The raid finally got off the ground in the early morning of 26 January.

== Mission ==
The Iraqi aircraft took off with tanker aircraft and flew towards the Iranian border at extremely low altitudes to avoid detection. Once they reached the Iranian border, they turned south and headed towards their target. En route they had to complete aerial refueling at an altitude of 100m, which they did successfully. The four jets continued on with the mission, making it to about 50 miles south of Kuwait unopposed.

The reason for the lack of opposition, either by Iraqi planning or luck, was the flight path took them directly between the control zones of the U.S. Navy and U.S. Air Force, causing a large delay in either of them acting on the intruding enemy aircraft. Once they were detected, an AWACS aircraft promptly cleared the airspace in front of the Iraqi aircraft and vectored two Saudi F-15s against them. This was done under the direct orders of General Schwarzkopf, who wanted to demonstrate that the ongoing war was a multi-national conflict. Up until this point, only American aircraft had shot down Iraqi aircraft.

The Royal Saudi Air Force was widely regarded as inferior in training and discipline to other Coalition air forces, and was seen as mediocre at best. For this reason, Saudi jets were kept well out of the active combat zone and assigned to patrols just inside the Saudi border in order to prevent them from interfering with ongoing operations by the rest of the coalition. It was for this reason that on top of vectoring the Saudi jets to intercept the Iraqi bombers, the AWACS routed a number of USMC AV-8B Harriers behind them in case the Saudis were unable to complete the air-to-air kill.

Upon seeing the incoming F-15s, the two MiG-23s fled back to Iraq, leaving the Mirage F1s unprotected. Despite their fighter cover fleeing, the two Mirages piloted by Major. Ali Hussein Fadel and Capt. Mohammed Saleem, pressed on with the mission. Flying the lead Saudi F-15 was Capt. Iyad Al-Shamrani. Despite being given good vectors, Al-Shamrani struggled to complete the intercept. With the Iraqi bombers fast approaching Ras Tanura, the American AWACS went step-by-step with Al-Shamrani to line himself up behind the two remaining Iraqi jets. Al-Shamrani eventually managed to shoot both Iraqi jets down with AIM-9 Sidewinder missiles, though only mere minutes before they reached their target. Both Iraqi pilots Fadel and Saleem were killed.

== Result ==
Al-Shamrani became recognized as a hero among Saudi people, and to this day is the only Saudi fighter pilot with multiple air-to-air kills. He would go on to be the only non-American coalition pilot to claim any air-to-air victories for the duration of the war.

The Iraqi mission report states that due to the low altitude of the mission, Iraqi radar lost contact with the aircraft soon after they crossed into Kuwait and it was assumed that they were shot down upon not returning to base.
