= Kilk =

Kilk is Estonian surname. Notable people with the surname include:

- Miljard Kilk (born 1957), Estonian artist
- Rein Kilk (born 1953), Estonian entrepreneur and sport figure
- Urve Kilk (born 1937) Estonian teacher and folk dance organizer

== See also ==
- Kelk
