= List of Gulf War pilots by victories =

The following is a list of air force pilots of the Gulf War by number of aerial victories.

== List of air-air victories ==
Name	Country	Service	Aircraft Flown	Victories	Notes
Capt. Thomas Dietz	United States	Air Force	F-15C	3	—
1st Lt. Robert Hehemann	United States	Air Force	F-15C	3	If scored two more kills in another air battle it would have made him the war's only "ace". According to the IQAF he was shot down by Capt. as-Sammarai, while the USAF maintain that his aircraft was only damaged.
Capt. Cesar Rodriguez	United States	Air Force	F-15C	2	Rodriguez would go on to score another air-air kill in 1999 over Yugoslavia.
Capt. Rhory Draeger	United States	Air Force	F-15C	2	—
Capt. Robert Graeter	United States	Air Force	F-15C	2	His second credit was maneuvered into the ground by an unarmed American EF-111. Graeter received credit for the kill as he was giving chase to the Iraqi fighter jet at the time.
Capt. Jay Denney	United States	Air Force	F-15C	2	—
Capt. Anthony Murphy	United States	Air Force	F-15C	2	—
Capt. Benjamin Powell	United States	Air Force	F-15C	2	—
Capt. Iyad Al-Shamrani	Saudi Arabia	Air Force	F-15C	2	Shot down two Iraqi Mirage F1s who were attempting to bomb a Saudi oil refinery. Was the first coalition pilot to shoot down multiple aircraft.
Zuhair Dawoud Al-Tamimi	(Iraq) Iraqi Republic	Air Force	MiG-25	1	Credited with downing Commander Michael Speicher, in the US's first combat loss of the war.
Nafie Al-Jubouri	(Iraq) Iraqi Republic	Air Force	Dassault Mirage F1	1	Credited with an aerial maneuvering kill of an EF-111 that crashed into the ground while attempting to evade a missile fired by Al-Jubouri.
Jameel Sayhood	(Iraq) Iraqi Republic	Air Force	MiG-29	1	Was shot down by Cesar Rodriguez in a dogfight later.
Capt. Richard Bennett / Capt. Dan Bakke	United States	Air Force	F-15E	1	Captain Daniel Bakke was the Weapon Systems Officer and Captain Richard Bennett was the pilot for the kill. It is the only known instance in history of one aircraft purposefully bombing another aircraft in mid-air.
Capt. John Donesky	United States	Air Force	F-15C	1	—
Capt. Jon Kelk	United States	Air Force	F-15C	1	Kelk was the first to claim an air-to-air kill of the war by shooting down an Iraqi MiG-29. He is also the first pilot to claim a victory in an American F-15 Eagle.
1st Lt. David Sveden	United States	Air Force	F-15C	1	—
Maj. Randy May	United States	Air Force	F-15C	1	—
Capt. Greg Masters	United States	Air Force	F-15C	1	—
Capt. Charles Magill	United States	Marines	F-15C	1	—
LT. Donald Broce / CDR Ron McElraft	United States	Navy	F-14A	1	Commander Ron McElcraft was the Radar Intercept Officer and LT. Stuart Broce was the pilot credited with the kill.
LCDR Mark Fox	United States	Navy	F/A-18C	1	—
LT Nicholas Mongillo	United States	Navy	F/A-18C	1	—
Col. Rick Parsons	United States	Air Force	F-15C	1	—
Capt. Lawrence Pitts	United States	Air Force	F-15C	1	—
Capt. David Prather	United States	Air Force	F-15C	1	—
Capt. David Rose	United States	Air Force	F-15C	1	—
Capt. Anthony Schiavi	United States	Air Force	F-15C	1	—
Capt. Tod Sheehy	United States	Air Force	A-10A	1	—
Capt. Robert Swain	United States	Air Force	A-10	1	Captain Robert Swain attained his aerial victory in an A-10 Warthog, a close air support aircraft that was not designed for aerial combat. It was the first of two air-air victories of that aircraft type.
Capt. Steven Tate	United States	Air Force	F-15C	1	—
Capt. Richard Tollini	United States	Air Force	F-15C	1	—
Capt. Craig Underhill	United States	Air Force	F-15C	1	—
Capt. Donald Watrous	United States	Air Force	F-15C	1	—
Capt. Stephen Dingee	United States	Air Force	F-15C	0.5	Captain Stephen Dingee and Captain Mark McKenzie shared a kill of a Mi-8 helicopter.
Capt. Mark McKenzie	United States	Air Force	F-15C	0.5	Captain Stephen Dingee and Captain Mark McKenzie shared a kill of a Mi-8 helicopter.

== Claims ==
Name	Country	Service	Aircraft Flown	Victories	Notes
James Denton	United States	Air Force	EF-111	1	Captain James Denton was the pilot of an unarmed EF-111 when he came under attack from an Iraqi Mirage F1 fighter. After evading several missiles fired at them, Denton managed to goad the Iraqi pilot into low altitude maneuvering whereupon the Iraqi fighter crashed. Denton and his electronic warfare officer Captain Brent Brandon were both awarded the Distinguished Flying Cross for their achievement. The Smithsonian Channel in 2021-22 researched the EF-111 / F-1 low-altitude engagement and subsequently produced and aired in May 2022 the EF-111 Raven's encounter with the Mirage F-1EQ.
Capt. Mohammed Jassim as-Sammarai	(Iraq) Iraqi Republic	Air Force	MiG-25	1	Credited by the Iraqi Air Force with shooting down an F-15C after a Bedouin smuggler allegedly discovered wreckage of an F-15 just inside Saudi Arabia, very close to where Iraqi radars claim to have lost track of a falling F-15 during Operation Samurra. Disputed by the USAF who claim only the left engine was damaged by the missile.

== See also ==
- Air engagements of the Gulf War
