= Cesar Rodriguez (pilot) =

United States Air Force pilot

Cesar Antonio Rodriguez
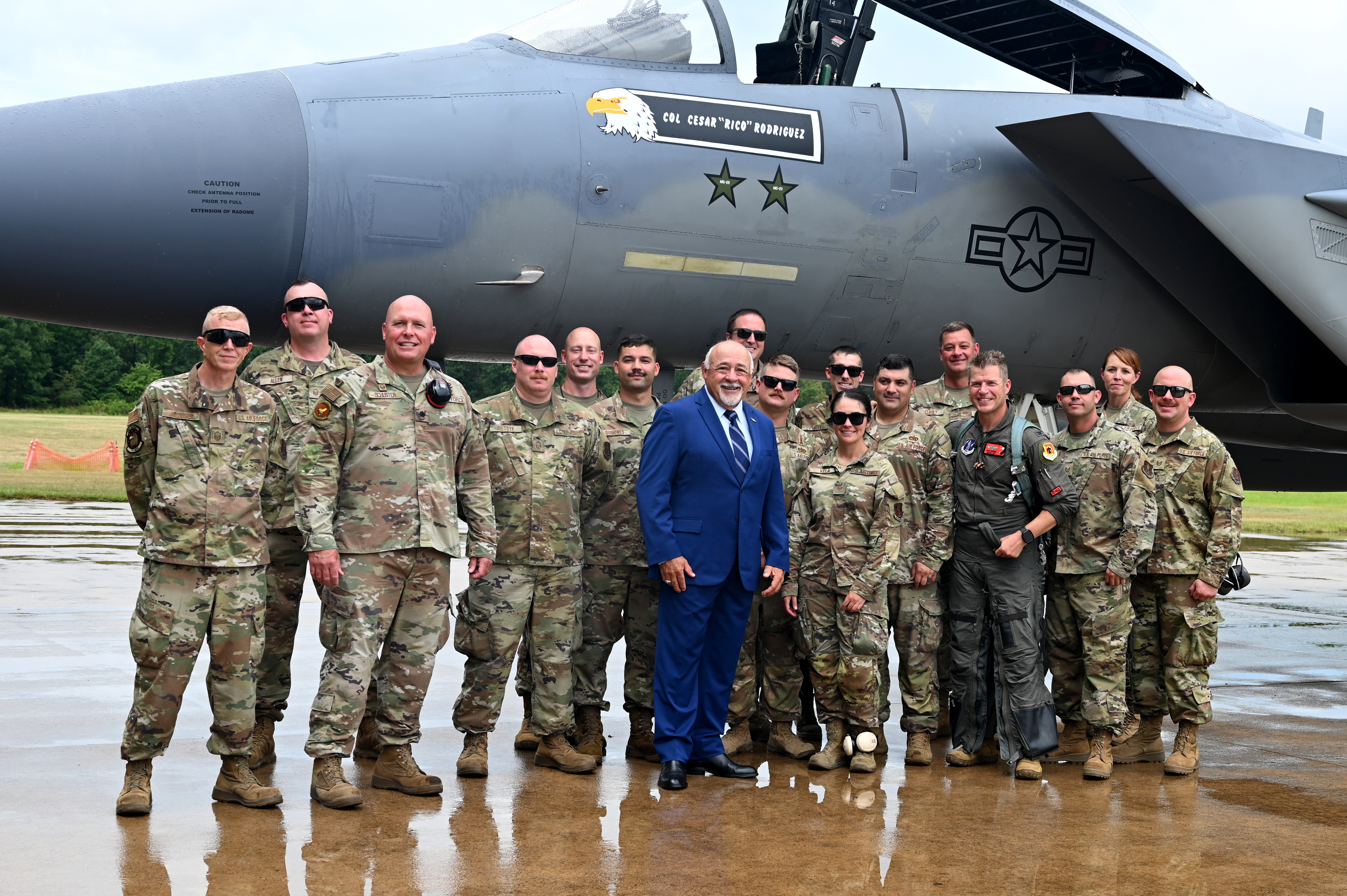
- Rodriguez at the ceremony with US airmen when his combat aircraft was moved to the Smithsonian
- Born: March 22, 1959 (age 67); El Paso, Texas, U.S.
- Military career
- Allegiance: United States
- Branch: United States Air Force
- Service years: 1981–2006
- Rank: Colonel
- Nickname: "Rico"
- Unit: 33rd Tactical Fighter Wing
- Conflicts: Gulf War; Operation Desert Storm; Air engagements of the Gulf War; Kosovo War; Operation Allied Force
- Awards: (see below)

Colonel (Ret.) Cesar Antonio Rodriguez is a former United States Air Force (USAF) officer and pilot who served from 1981 to 2006. With three air-to-air combat victories, he joined USAF pilots Thomas Dietz, Robert Hehemann and Robert Wright as the closest to becoming a flying ace of any U.S. pilot since the Vietnam War; until April 13, 2024, when several USAF pilots attained ace status during an attack on Israel from Iran. Rodriguez scored his kills in an F-15 Eagle - the first two kills in 1991, during the first Gulf War, against a Mikoyan MiG-29 and a Mikoyan MiG-23 of the Iraqi Air Force, and his third kill came against a MiG-29 of the Yugoslav air force during the 1999 NATO bombing of Yugoslavia.

== Early life and education ==
Rodriguez was born in 1959 in El Paso, Texas; son of a career U.S. Army non-commissioned officer he lived on various military bases and graduated from Antilles High School at Fort Buchanan, Puerto Rico in 1977. He received a degree in Business Administration from The Citadel in 1981 and was commissioned as an officer in the United States Air Force, after attending Undergraduate Pilot Training he was awarded pilot wings in November 1982.

== Career ==
His first operational assignment was flying the Fairchild Republic A-10 Thunderbolt II at Suwon Air Base, South Korea; in 1985 he was selected to attend the Instructor Pilot Course at Randolph Air Force Base, Texas then spent the following three years as an AT-38 Instructor Pilot at Holloman AFB, New Mexico; in 1988 he transitioned to the McDonnell Douglas F-15 Eagle and was assigned to the 33d Tactical Fighter Wing at Eglin AFB, Florida. Rodriguez flew missions in support of the U.S. invasion of Panama in 1989 and following service in Operation Desert Storm served on the staff of 9th Air Force at Shaw AFB, South Carolina then attended Air Command and Staff College at Maxwell AFB in Montgomery, Alabama. Beginning in 1995 he was Chief of Force Requirements and Executive Officer to the Commander of U.S. Air Forces Europe at Ramstein Air Base, Germany then returned to operational flying as a pilot and Chief of Safety with the 48th Fighter Wing at RAF Lakenheath, UK; he next served as Assistant Chief of Safety at Air Combat Command Headquarters at Langley AFB, Virginia and then attended the Naval War College in Newport, Rhode Island. In 2002 he was assigned as Deputy Commander of the 366th Operations Group at Mountain Home AFB, Idaho and also deployed to Kuwait in support of Operation Iraqi Freedom serving as Operations Group Commander for the 332d Air Expeditionary Wing, the largest flying unit in Central Command. His final assignment was as Commander of the 355th Mission Support Group at Davis-Monthan AFB, Arizona; he retired in November 2006. His numerous awards include the Legion of Merit, three Distinguished Flying Crosses and the Air Medal with 11 oak leaf clusters.

=== Persian Gulf War ===
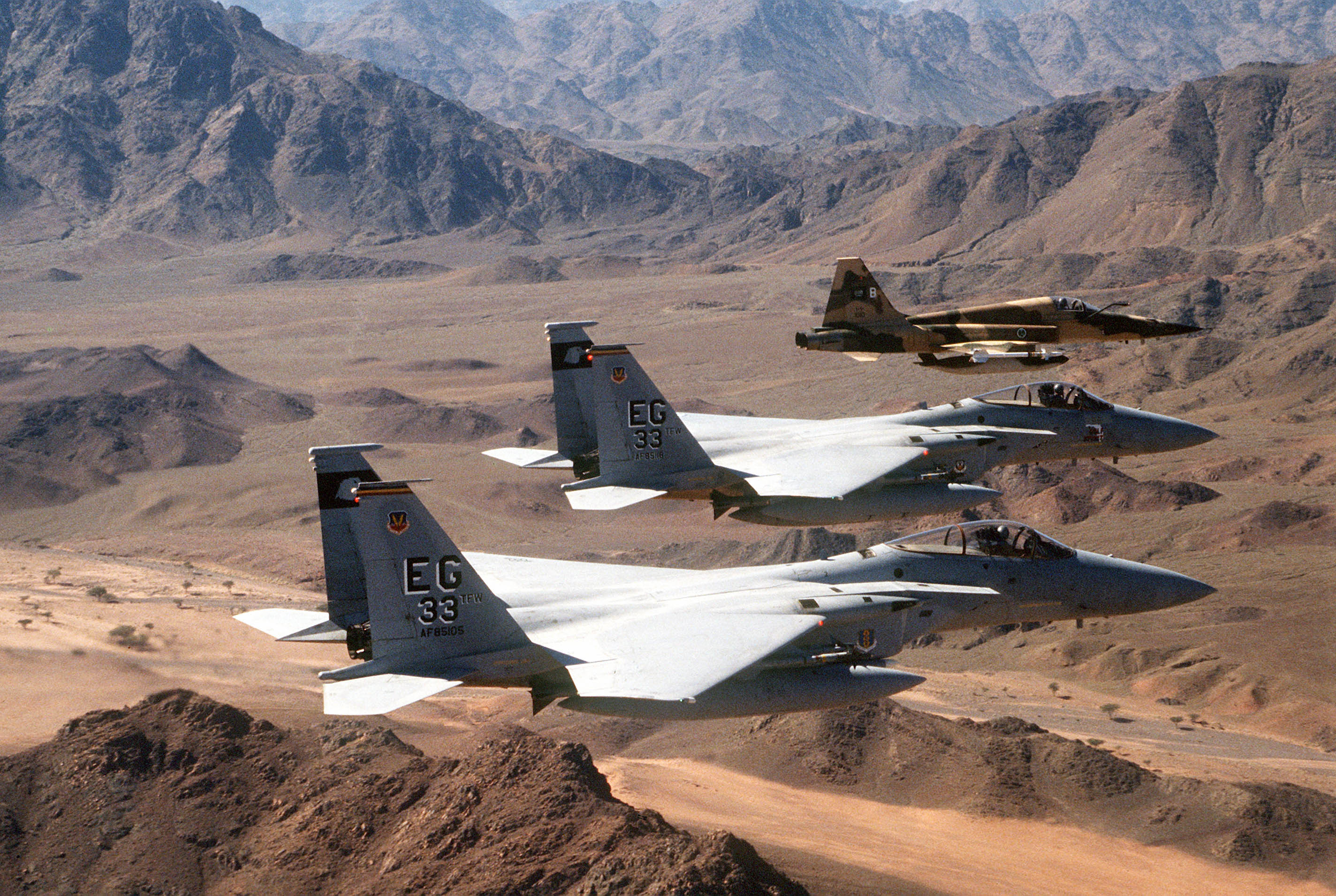
Two U.S. Air Force F-15C Eagle fighter aircraft from the 33rd Tactical Fighter Wing, Eglin AFB, Florida, and a Royal Saudi Air Force F-5E Tiger II fighter aircraft during a mission in support of Operation Desert Storm

Rodriguez, call sign "Rico" scored the first two air-to-air direct hits of his USAF career in the Gulf War. His first hit occurred when he and his wingman Craig "Mole" Underhill came across two Iraqi MiG-29 "Fulcrums". The two F-15s quickly locked up the MiG-29s, which turned east to avoid them. However, an AWACS then reported two more MiG-29s coming in fast at them from the west a mere 13 miles away. The two F-15s and two MiG-29s charged straight at each other. Underhill quickly fired an AIM-7 Sparrow radar guided missile at the first MiG. At the same time, the second MiG-29, piloted by Captain Jameel Sayhood, "locked up" Rodriguez, who then quickly executed a dive down to the deck to avoid the radar lock and nearly collided with the AIM-7 fired by Rodriguez's wingman which, seconds later, destroyed the lead MiG. After seeing his wingman killed, Sayhood decided to bug out briefly. Rodriguez rejoined with Underhill until Sayhood reappeared. Underhill locked him up, though his computer would not let him fire the AIM-7 to destroy the MiG because of a glitch in his IFF system which told him that the MiG was a friendly aircraft. Rodriguez and Sayhood then proceeded to merge, whereupon they both turned left and promptly got into a turning fight. As they descended towards the ground, Sayhood attempted to execute a split S maneuver. However, having insufficient altitude (about 600 feet) he crashed into the ground. Rodriguez was credited with a maneuvering kill. Later while flying back to his base, Rodriguez was repeatedly locked on by patrolling friendly Royal Saudi Air Force F-15s. After several warnings, Rodriguez threatened to shoot the aircraft down if they locked onto him one more time.

His second kill came as he was flying in formation with three other pilots, Captain Rory Draeger with his wingman Captain Tony "Kimo" Schiavi, and Rodriguez with his wingman Captain Bruce Till. An AWACS picked up four Iraqi MiG-23s taking off from the airfield designated H2. The four F-15s turned ninety degrees, and spread out over a space of ten miles to maximize their radar and missile coverage. One of the four MiGs bugged out with mechanical problems. Draeger assigned the targets, taking the lead MiG, while Schiavi took the northern one, and Rodriguez was assigned the southern MiG. The three of them locked up the MiGs and all fired AIM-7s. All three MiGs were destroyed within seconds of each other to for a "textbook" beyond visual range fight. The moment of the missiles impact in the MiG-23 was caught in the cockpit camera of that MiG, which was later recovered by a special forces team.

=== Kosovo War ===
During 1999's Operation Allied Force in Yugoslavia, Rodriguez was deployed as part of the NATO campaign against the Yugoslavs. On the first night of the campaign, March 24, 1999, several Yugoslav MiG-29s took off to resist the NATO air attacks. Two MiGs took off on the opening night from Nis Air Base. The first was downed by an AIM-120 AMRAAM missile strike from a Royal Netherlands Air Force F-16 Fighting Falcon fighter, while the second flown by Yugoslav pilot Major Ilijo Arizanov was engaged and shot down by an F-15 Eagle piloted by Rodriguez. The MiG-29s of the Yugoslav air force were suffering severe problems with their systems. Arizanov was having trouble getting his radar working when he was shot down by Rodriguez. This would be Rodriguez's final kill, making him the leading MiG-killer since the Vietnam War and tying him with three other USAF pilots for the most aerial victories since the Vietnam War.

After his combat service, Rodriguez continued to serve with the U.S. Air Force until November 30, 2006, when he retired with the rank of colonel.

== Awards and decorations ==

United States Air Force Command Pilot Badge
Legion of Merit
Distinguished Flying Cross with "V" device and two bronze oak leaf clusters	Bronze Star	Defense Meritorious Service Medal
Meritorious Service Medal with four bronze oak leaf clusters	Air Medal with silver and bronze oak leaf clusters	Aerial Achievement Medal
Air Force Commendation Medal with bronze oak leaf cluster	Air Force Achievement Medal	Air Force Outstanding Unit Award with "V" device and three bronze oak leaf clusters
Air Force Outstanding Unit Award (second ribbon required for accouterment spacing)	Combat Readiness Medal with two bronze oak leaf clusters	National Defense Service Medal with service star
Armed Forces Expeditionary Medal	Southwest Asia Service Medal with three bronze campaign stars	Kosovo Campaign Medal
Iraq Campaign Medal	Global War on Terrorism Service Medal	Korea Defense Service Medal
Air Force Overseas Short Tour Service Ribbon with bronze oak leaf cluster	Air Force Overseas Long Tour Service Ribbon	Air Force Longevity Service Award with silver oak leaf cluster
Small Arms Expert Marksmanship Ribbon	Air Force Training Ribbon	NATO Medal (Yugoslavia)
NATO Medal (Kosovo)	Kuwait Liberation Medal (Saudi Arabia)	Kuwait Liberation Medal (Kuwait)

== Personal life ==
Rodriguez currently resides in Tucson, Arizona and works for Raytheon Missile Systems. In addition to serving on the board of the American Latino Veterans Association and a member of the Military Officers Association of America.

== Aerial victory credits ==
Date	Type	Location	Aircraft flown	Unit assigned
January 19, 1991	MiG-29	Iraq	F-15C	33 TFW, 58 TFS
January 26, 1991	MiG-23	Iraq	F-15C	33 TFW, 58 TFS
March 24, 1999	MiG-29	Yugoslavia	F-15C	48 FW, 493 FS

== See also ==
- List of Gulf War pilots by victories
