= Samurra Air Battle =

Iraqi Air Force operation in the Gulf War

- Part of the air campaign of the Gulf War
Date	30 January 1991
Location	Khan Bani Saad, Iraq
Result	Iraqi victory

Belligerents
United States	Iraq

Commanders and leaders
Lt. Col. Randy Bigum; Capt. Thomas Dietz; 1st Lt. Robert Hehemann; 1st Lt. Lynn Broome	Capt. Mahmoud Awad; Capt. Mohammed Jassim as-Sammarai

Strength
"Xerex 31": 2 F-15C "Xerex 33": 2 F-15C	No. 96 Sqn: 1 MiG-25PDS; No. 97 Sqn: 1 MiG-25PDS

Casualties and losses
2 F-15s shot down (Iraqi claim); None (US claim)	None

Operation Samurra was an operation by the Iraqi Air Force (IQAF) during the Gulf War to decisively engage McDonnell Douglas F-15C Eagle fighters from the United States Air Force (USAF) using Mikoyan-Gurevich MiG-25PDS interceptors, and break the "wall" of F-15s that the Coalition had established along Iraq's border with Iran.

It demonstrated the last true offensive operation of the IQAF before grounding their air assets in an attempt to preserve them for future use. The battle involved two MiG-25PDS jets engaging USAF F-15C fighters, of the 53rd Tactical Fighter Squadron out of Al Kharj Air Base, in a beyond-visual range air-to-air engagement.

== Prelude ==
By January 19, 1991 it had become apparent to Iraqi leadership that they could not engage Coalition air forces openly. President of Iraq Saddam Hussein had ordered most of his air assets to be conserved inside of bunkers in an attempt to save them for future use against the Coalition. Consequently, Coalition sorties began targeting aircraft hangars and shelters to destroy the Iraqi Air Force on the ground.

Between 17 and 27 January, 117 Iraqi aircraft were destroyed on the ground. Saddam ordered his air force to evacuate their aircraft to neighbouring Iran temporarily, to be used in future sorties. Iran instead interned the aircraft.

Flying in flights of four, Iraqi military aircraft retreated east across the country, routed through Baghdad airspace due to its heavy air defenses. To counter this, the USAF established a "wall" of F-15s along the Iranian border to shoot down any aircraft attempting to flee. In order to facilitate the retreat of its air force, Iraq sought to shoot down these patrolling F-15s.

== Plan ==
Planning for Operation Samurra had begun as early as 18 January, when the IQAF was bolstered by a successful operation the next night whereupon they disrupted several USAF EF-111 Ravens that were jamming Iraqi radars in support of an American F-15E Strike Eagle strike package. An Iraqi SAM was able to shoot down one of the now unprotected F-15Es. However, following the loss of two MiG-25s to F-15C's on the same day, while scoring no victories in return, it became clear to the IQAF that a change in tactics would be necessary

The plan involved having two MiG-25 aircraft from different directions vectored onto an isolated group of F-15s. If the F-15s tried to attack one of the MiGs, the other would be in a flanking position which would enable it to down the F-15s more easily. Iraq had retained their MiG-25 "Foxbats" for this mission. Monitoring Coalition AWACS and F-15 radio frequencies, Iraqi forces waited for the proper situation to begin the operation.

== Battle ==
On January 30, an Iraqi intelligence unit intercepted communications that one of the patrols, "Xerex 31" was approaching "bingo fuel" which necessitated an hour and a half round trip to an aerial tanker. This left just two F-15 jets, "Xerex 33" piloted by USAF Capt. Thomas Dietz, and another by 1st Lt. Robert Hehemann, in the area. Recognizing the opportunity, two MiG-25s were scrambled from two separate air bases.

Capt. Mahmoud Awad took off from Qadessiya Air Base, while Capt. Mohammed Jassi as-Sammarai took off from Tammuz Air Base. After engaging a false target, both pilots were directed to Dietz and Hehemann by Iraqi air traffic control. As a result of this mistaken engagement, the MiGs pincer had closed over southern Baghdad with "Xerex 33" 40 miles to the east and "Xerex 31" 80 miles to the south, which was now returning after they had finished refueling.

Awad and as-Sammarai were then vectored by Iraqi GCI to engage "Xerex 33." As the MiG's turned toward them, the F-15's detected them on RWR and turned to engage head on. Upon turning Hehemann immediately detected both MiGs and gained a radar lock on as-Sammarai. Deitz attempted to target Awad, who was trailing several miles behind the first MiG. Hehemann fired an AIM-7 Sparrow. After realizing that its motor had failed, and that both he and Dietz had been locked by the MiGs, Hehemann fired a second missile.

As a result, as-Sammarai turned to the north to evade, breaking his own lock and causing the R-40RD he had launched to miss. Meanwhile Dietz locked onto Awad and three times attempted to engage with Sparrows. All three missiles failed. Detecting a radar lock from Awad, Dietz went defensive, making a turn to the north before ordering the flight to disengage to the east. Hehemann attempted to follow as-Sammarai's turn to the north, and then to the west toward Tammuz Air Base. Hehemann fired another Sparrow, and was forced to break off to the east while deploying countermeasures after being locked by Awad.

At the same time, "Xerex 31" was returning from the aerial tanker and had been monitoring the air battle. Pilots Lt. Col. Randy Bigum, commander of the 53rd Tactical Fighter Squadron stationed in Bitburg Germany deployed to Al Kharj.)and 1st Lt. Lynn Broome correctly guessed the MiGs would try to land at Tammuz. They directed their F-15s to the northwest in an attempt to intercept the two MiG-25s, while avoiding the SAMs around Baghdad. A high altitude crosswind pushed them over Baghdad, which was the most heavily defended airspace in Iraq.

The two were locked-on by Iraqi gunners, but were not engaged – likely because the Iraqi gunners were trying to avoid hitting the MiGs. Bigum later stated he didn't notice the drift because he and his wing-man were determined to score a MiG kill. Despite this, they managed to achieve radar lock on both as-Sammarai and Awad, and each fired a missile at them. Both missed.

Bigum fired a second missile at Awad, but Awad landed his aircraft before the missile arrived. Bigum fired again at as-Sammarai as he was on his final landing approach, but lost the radar lock as as-Sammarai landed and the missile impacted the ground about 10 ft (3 m) from as-Sammarai's left wingtip. Bigum and Broome egressed the area before they could be shot down by surface-to-air missiles, which were still targeting them.

== Result ==
The Iraqi Air Force first credited as-Sammarai with a possible victory which was later upgraded to confirmed after a Bedouin smuggler allegedly discovered wreckage of an F-15 just inside Saudi Arabia, very close to where Iraqi radars claim to have lost track of a falling F-15 on January 30. Later Iraqi government documents claim two F-15s recorded as being shot down in this engagement. According to the USAF, there is no record of an F-15 being damaged or lost on January 30 in the area west of Baghdad. Some of the US pilots involved gave accounts of the battle, in which none of them mention any US aircraft suffering damage or being shot down. This included 1st Lt. Hehemann, who was the pilot whom the Iraqis claim to have downed

Operation Samurra was the last offensive operation of the Iraqi Air Force during the Gulf War. By mid-February all IQAF activity had effectively ceased as the Coalition completed their dominance over the skies, and not a single offensive sortie was even attempted during the ground phase of the war. 15 out of the original 35 MiG-25's in Iraq's arsenal survived the war, and went on to serve until the 2003 invasion of Iraq when they were buried, by which time they remained in various states of airworthiness.

Dietz and Hehemann would go on to be the highest scoring fighter pilots of the Gulf War, with three air-to-air kills apiece by the war's end. All of these would be scored around the area of the January 30th engagement against aircraft attempting to flee to Iraq Bigum and Broome finished the war with no kills.

== See also ==
- Air engagements of the Gulf War
- List of Gulf War pilots by victories
