= Kelk, East Riding of Yorkshire =

Civil parish in the East Riding of Yorkshire, England

Coordinates: 54.0169°N 0.3184°W

Kelk
- Civil parish
- Population: 158 (2011 census)
- OS grid reference: TA102591
- Civil parish: Kelk
- Unitary authority: East Riding of Yorkshire
- Ceremonial county: East Riding of Yorkshire
- Region: Yorkshire and the Humber
- Country: England
- Sovereign state: United Kingdom
- Post town: DRIFFIELD
- Postcode district: YO25
- Police: Humberside
- Fire: Humberside
- Ambulance: Yorkshire
- UK Parliament: Bridlington and The Wolds

Kelk is a civil parish in the East Riding of Yorkshire, England. It is situated 7 miles (11 km) to the south-west of Bridlington town centre and covering an area of 768.523 hectares (1,899.06 acres).

The civil parish is formed by the village of Great Kelk and the hamlet of Little Kelk.

According to the 2011 UK census, Kelk parish had a population of 158, a decrease on the 2001 UK census figure of 180.
