= Mudaysis Air Base =

Mudaysis
- IATA: none; ICAO: none

Summary
- Location: Al Anbar Governorate, Iraq
- Coordinates: 32.4099°N 41.9486°E
- Interactive map of Mudaysis

Mudaysis is a military airfield located in Al Anbar Governorate, Iraq. The field was used various times by the United States military during the 2003 Iraq War.

During the 1991 Gulf War, the Mudaysis radar site was knocked out by F-15 Eagles. Several Dassault Mirage F1 aircraft were shot down over Mudaysis by the F-15s.

In 2003, radar sites at Mudaysis were bombed by American aircraft; an F-16 attacked the radar site with a PGM.
