= Great Kelk =

Village in the East Riding of Yorkshire, England

Coordinates: 54.006319°N 0.317004°W

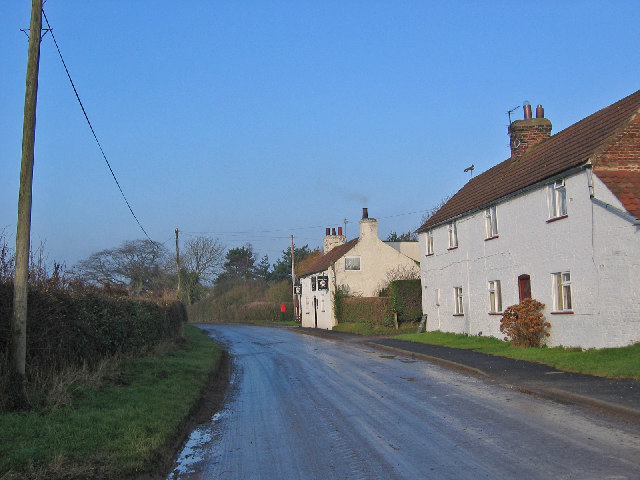

- Location within the East Riding of Yorkshire
- OS grid reference: TA103580
  - London: 170 mi (270 km) S
- Civil parish: Kelk
- Unitary authority: East Riding of Yorkshire
- Ceremonial county: East Riding of Yorkshire
- Region: Yorkshire and the Humber
- Country: England
- Sovereign state: United Kingdom
- Post town: DRIFFIELD
- Postcode district: YO25
- Dialling code: 01262
- Police: Humberside
- Fire: Humberside
- Ambulance: Yorkshire
- UK Parliament: Bridlington and The Wolds

Great Kelk is a village and former civil parish, now in the parish of Kelk, in the East Riding of Yorkshire, England. It is situated approximately 7.5 miles (12.1 km) south-west of Bridlington. In 1931 the parish had a population of 117.

The name Kelk derives from the Old English celce meaning 'chalkland'.

In 1823 Great Kelk inhabitants numbered 158. Occupations included eight farmers, a gardener, a shoemaker, and the landlord of the Board public house.

Great Kelk was formerly a township in the parish of Foston on the Wolds, from 1866 Great Kelk was a civil parish in its own right, on 1 April 1935 the parish was abolished and merged with Little Kelk to form "Kelk".
