= Little Kelk =

Hamlet in the East Riding of Yorkshire, England

Coordinates: 54.026259°N 0.322366°W

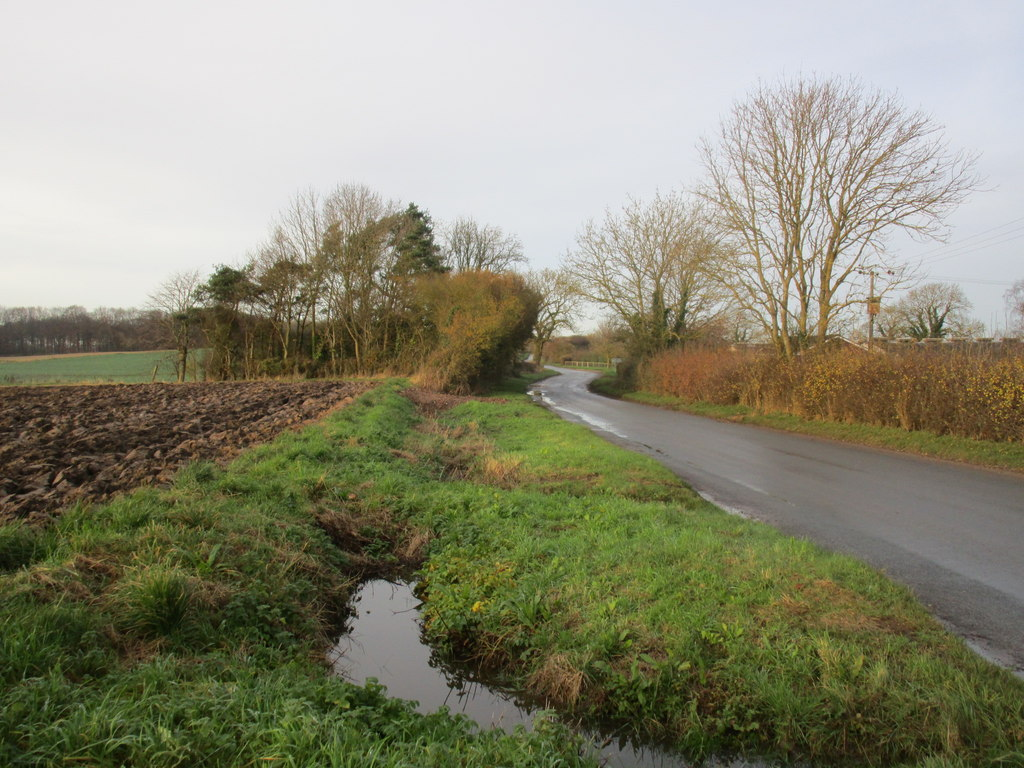
- Main Street

- Location within the East Riding of Yorkshire
- OS grid reference: TA099602
  - London: 170 mi (270 km) S
- Civil parish: Kelk
- Unitary authority: East Riding of Yorkshire
- Ceremonial county: East Riding of Yorkshire
- Region: Yorkshire and the Humber
- Country: England
- Sovereign state: United Kingdom
- Post town: DRIFFIELD
- Postcode district: YO25
- Dialling code: 01262
- Police: Humberside
- Fire: Humberside
- Ambulance: Yorkshire
- UK Parliament: Bridlington and The Wolds

Little Kelk is a small hamlet in the civil parish of Kelk, in the East Riding of Yorkshire, England. It is situated approximately 6.5 miles (10.5 km) south-west of Bridlington town centre.

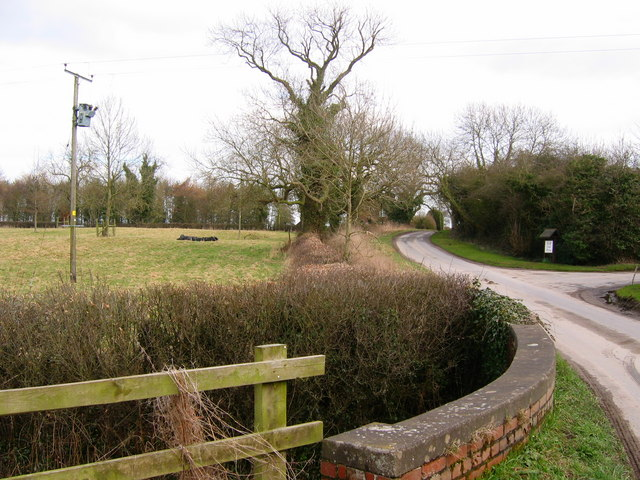
entrance to Kelk Lake House

== History ==
The name Kelk derives from the Old English celce meaning 'chalkland'.

In 1823 Little Kelk inhabitants numbered 51, two being farmers.

Little Kelk was formerly an extra-parochial tract, in 1858 Little Kelk became a separate civil parish, on 1 April 1935 the parish was abolished and merged with Great Kelk to form "Kelk". In 1931 the parish had a population of 51.
