= Jon K. Kelk =

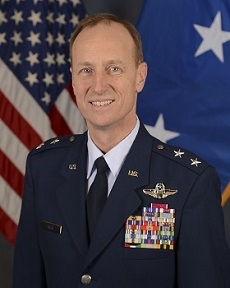
Jon Kelk in 2014

Jon K. Kelk is a major general in the National Guard of the United States and former commander of the California Air National Guard. He currently serves as the Air National Guard Assistant to the Commander of United States Air Forces in Europe – Air Forces Africa.

== Career ==
Kelk was first commissioned an officer in 1981. He would go on to serve in the Gulf War as well as Operation Provide Comfort, Operation Southern Watch, and Operation Northern Watch. He was awarded the Distinguished Flying Cross after he was credited with downing the first Iraqi warplane, a MiG 29, during Operation Desert Storm while serving as a member of the 33rd Tactical Fighter Wing, flying the F-15C Eagle. From 1999 to 2001 he held command of the 110th Fighter Squadron.

Other awards he has received include the Legion of Merit, the Meritorious Service Medal with two oak leaf clusters, the Air Medal with four oak leaf clusters, the Aerial Achievement Medal, the Air Force Commendation Medal with two oak leaf clusters, the Air Force Achievement Medal with oak leaf cluster, the Joint Meritorious Unit Award, the Outstanding Unit Award, the Organizational Excellence Award, the Combat Readiness Medal with one silver oak leaf cluster and four bronze oak leaf clusters, the National Defense Service Medal with oak leaf cluster, the Armed Forces Expeditionary Medal with two service stars, the Southwest Asia Service Medal with two service stars, the Global War on Terrorism Service Medal, the Armed Forces Service Medal, the Air Force Longevity Service Award with three oak leaf clusters, the Armed Forces Reserve Medal with hourglass device, the Air Force Training Ribbon, the Kuwait Liberation Medal (Saudi Arabia), and the Kuwait Liberation Medal (Kuwait).

== Education ==
- University of Wisconsin-Eau Claire
