= Saleh Al-Muhaya =

Saudi general (born 1939)

Saleh Al-Muhaya صالح المحيا
- Born: 1939 (83–84 years old); Ar Rass, Al-Qassim Province, Saudi Arabia
- Allegiance: Saudi Arabia
- Branch: Saudi Arabian Army
- Service years: 1959–2011 (52 years)
- Rank: General
- Commands: Commander of the General Staff Vice-Commander of the Saudi Armed Forces; Commander of Ground Forces; Commander of the Eastern Region; Director of Planning and Budget; Director of the Office of the Chief of General Staff Commander of Madrspaldvaa air
- Conflicts: Gulf War; Shia insurgency in Yemen

General Saleh Al-Muhaya (Arabic: صالح المحيا), is the former Chief of the General Staff of the Saudi Arabian Army and the Vice-Commander of the Saudi Armed Forces. Beside the Field Marshal-Prince Khalid bin Sultan, Al-Muhaya led the Saudi Arabian Army in the Gulf War with the Allied Forces. He later commanded Saudi Forces during the Shia insurgency in Yemen before retiring in 2011.

== Biography ==
- Born in Ar Rass in 1939.
- Graduate high school arts section
- Graduated from King Abdul Aziz Military Academy on 1957
- Holds a session of Staff of the Command and Staff College from Britain, a similar course (staff) of the Command and Staff College in Saudi Arabia and the War Staff of China also won a number of military courses including a course artillery advanced from the United States the role of maintenance of missiles and cycle air defense and Staff training missiles from the United States of America and the intelligence course from China and other courses.

== Positions held ==
- From 1975 Commander of the air defense school.
- From 1979 Office Manager of the Commander-in-chief.
- From 1982, Director of Planning and Budget.
- From 1989, Commander of the Eastern region.
- From 1992, Commander of Royal Saudi Land Force.
- From 1997 to 2011 Commander-in-chief.
