= Brent Brandon =

United States Air Force officer

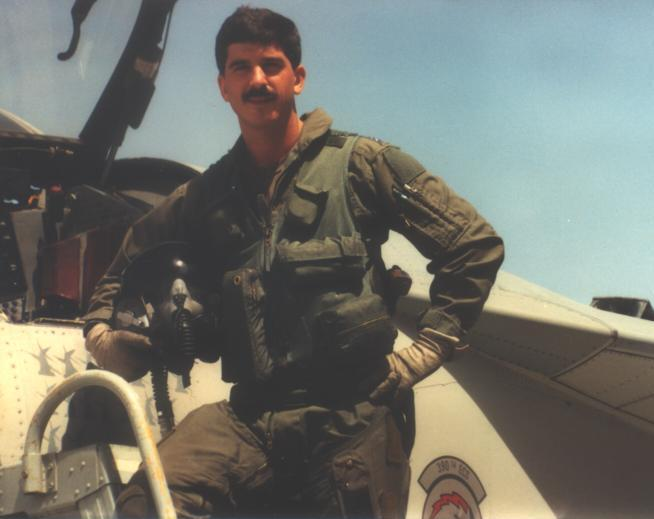
- Born: 1960 (age 65–66)
- Education: United States Air Force Academy; Bahrain School; Harvard Kennedy School
- Military career
- Allegiance: United States
- Branch: United States Air Force
- Conflicts: Gulf War: Operation Desert Storm

Brent D. Brandon (born 1960) is a former U.S. Air Force (1988–1992) officer and Electronic Warfare Officer for Captain James Denton who scored an air-to-air kill against an Iraqi Dassault Mirage F1, in the opening minutes of the Gulf War on January 17, 1991. During an engagement that involved aggressive, low-altitude maneuvering, the F-1 impacted the ground making Brandon's unarmed EF-111 the only F-111 to achieve an aerial victory over another aircraft.

== Background ==
After schooling near Oxford, England, Brent graduated in 1978 from the Bahrain School, an international high school in the Persian Gulf with students from 28 nations. He earned an appointment to the United States Air Force Academy, graduating in 1984 as the outstanding graduate in military performance and the outstanding graduate in political science. He earned a Master of Public Policy degree in 1986 from the John F. Kennedy School of Government at Harvard University. During his fellowship, he completed a policy analysis for the U.S. State Department's Bureau for Near East Asia, served as research assistant for the director of Harvard's Mid-East Center and performed economic policy analysis on trade for the Japanese Consulate in Boston.

As a United States Air Force captain, Brent completed undergraduate navigator training as a distinguished graduate and received his wings in 1988. He was assigned to the EF-111 fighter aircraft at Mountain Home Air Force Base, Idaho after winning the Air Force's award for Leadership, Flying and Academic Excellence and top honors in the AT-38 at Lead-In Fighter training at Holloman Air Force Base, New Mexico.

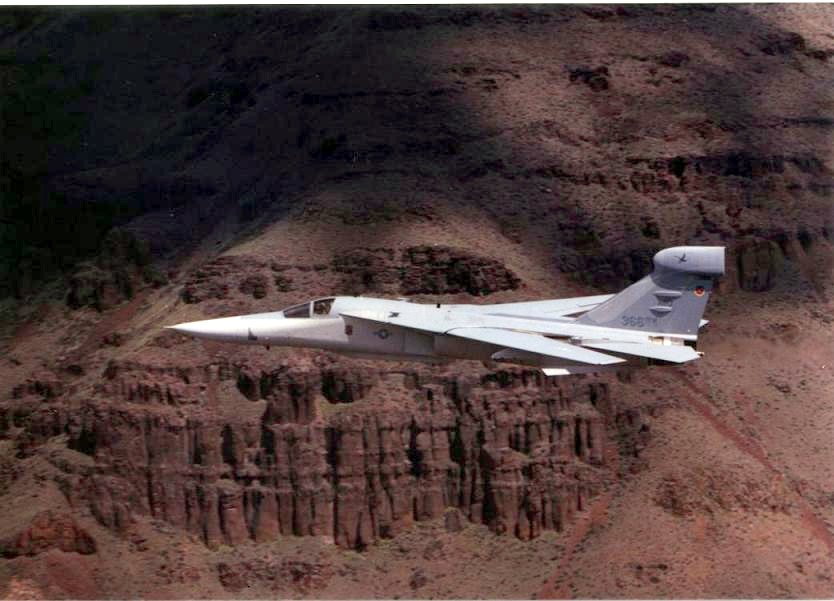
EF-111 Raven

Brandon is a combat veteran with 28 combat missions in Operation Desert Storm, including the first wave attack on January 17, 1991, for which he was awarded the Distinguished Flying Cross. Other decorations include the Air Medal with three oak leaf clusters, the Aerial Achievement Medal, Small Arms Expert Marksmanship Ribbon and the National Defense Medal.

He is the author of "The Evolution of Nuclear Deterrence" in American Defense Policy and has been the keynote speaker across the northwest, including at a statewide banquet whose former keynote speakers included Vice President Richard B. Cheney. He is spokesman for Washington Group International and is a contributing author to American Defense (Johns Hopkins Press.)
