= List of vice presidential trips made by JD Vance =

This is a list of vice presidential trips made by JD Vance during his tenure as the 50th vice president of the United States. This list excludes trips made within Washington, D.C., the U.S. federal capital, in which the Number One Observatory Circle, the official residence of the vice president, is located. Also excluded are trips to Camp David, the country residence of the president, as well as Joint Base Andrews. International trips are included. The list is organized chronologically by month. As of February 8, 2026, Vice President Vance has made 47 domestic trips to 26 states and 9 international trips visiting 12 countries/territories. Here are the number of visits per state (completed trips only):

State trips:

- One: Alabama, Alaska, Colorado, Delaware, Mississippi, Missouri, Nebraska, New Jersey, North Dakota, Oklahoma, South Dakota, Utah, Vermont, Wisconsin, Wyoming
- Two: Indiana, Iowa, Kansas, Kentucky, Maine, Minnesota, Nevada, Tennessee
- Three: Arizona, Georgia, Maryland, Montana, Pennsylvania
- Four: Florida and New York
- Five: California
- Six: North Carolina
- Seven: Michigan and Virginia
- Eight: Texas
- Thirteen: Ohio

International trips:
9 trips, 12 countries/territories: France, Germany, Greenland, Vatican City (2), Italy (3), India, United Kingdom, Israel, Armenia, Azerbaijan, Hungary, Pakistan, and Switzerland.

== 2025 ==
=== January ===
Country/ U.S. state	Areas visited	Dates	Details
Virginia	Damascus	January 27	Arriving via Bristol Tennessee-Virginia Regional Airport, Vice President Vance visited victims of Hurricane Helene and surveyed recovery efforts in the affected region.

=== February ===
Country/ U.S. state	Areas visited	Dates	Details
Ohio	East Palestine	February 3	Visited the site of the 2023 train-derailment chemical incident to review cleanup and recovery progress, meeting with local officials and residents.
France	Paris, Barbizon	February 10–13	Arriving via Paris Orly Airport, JD Vance attended the AI Action Summit at the Grand Palais. Was hosted by President Emmanuel Macron at the Élysée Palace. Met with Indian Prime Minister Narendra Modi to discuss energy diversification and Volodymyr Zelenskyy to discuss the Russo-Ukrainian War. Visited the Louvre Museum, the Forest of Fontainebleau and Seine-et-Marne.
Germany	Munich	February 13–15	Attended the 61st Munich Security Conference. Held bilateral meetings with president Frank-Walter Steinmeier, NATO secretary general Mark Rutte, UK's Foreign Secretary David Lammy and Ukrainian president Volodymyr Zelenskyy.
California	San Diego	February 16	Private trip. Attended a wedding.
Maryland	National Harbor	February 20	Vice President Vance delivered remarks at the Conservative Political Action Conference at the Gaylord National Resort & Convention Center.
Vermont	Warren	February 28	Vice President Vance and his family planned a ski-vacation weekend at Sugarbush Resort in Warren, Vermont; large protests lined Route 100 in Waitsfield and Warren in response to the trip.

=== March ===
Country/ U.S. state	Areas visited	Dates	Details
Vermont	Warren	March 1–2	Despite protests, Vice President Vance continued his family trip to Sugarbush Resort.
Texas	Eagle Pass	March 5	Visited the U.S.–Mexico border to inspect facilities and meet with border patrol agents.
Michigan	Warren	March 14	Visited manufacturing facilities with Small Business Administration Administrator Kelly Loeffler.
Virginia	Quantico	March 27	Visited U.S. Marines at Marine Corps Base Quantico.
Greenland	Pituffik	March 28–29	Vice President Vance and Second Lady Usha Vance visited Pituffik Space Base to meet with U.S. Space Force personnel.

=== April ===
Country/ U.S. state	Areas visited	Dates	Details
Texas	Houston	April 8	Vice President Vance attended a high-dollar fundraising luncheon in Houston as part of an RNC fundraising trip across Texas.
Texas	Dallas	April 8	Later the same day, Vice President Vance traveled to Dallas for a private GOP dinner that raised over $2 million.
Vatican City	Vatican City	April 18–20	Attended Holy Week events, including Good Friday liturgy at St. Peter's Basilica, Easter Mass. Briefly met Pope Francis.
Italy	Rome	April 18–20	Participated in additional diplomatic events as part of the Italy–India trip.
India	New Delhi, Agra, Jaipur	April 21–24	Vice President Vance and Second Lady Usha Vance conducted an official visit, toured Taj Mahal and met with Indian officials including Prime Minister Narendra Modi.

=== May ===
Country/ U.S. state	Areas visited	Dates	Details
Alabama	Tuscaloosa	May 1	Visited the Nucor steel mill to highlight American manufacturing.
Florida	Mar-a-Lago, West Palm Beach	May 1–2	Arriving via Palm Beach International Airport, alongside President Trump, Vice President Vance attended an event for 2026 Florida gubernatorial election candidate Byron Donalds. On May 2, he participated in the RNC Spring Gala.
Italy	Rome	May 17–19	Arriving via Rome Fiumicino Airport, Vice President Vance met with European Commission President Ursula von der Leyen, Italian Prime Minister Giorgia Meloni, Ukrainian President Volodymyr Zelenskyy and Canadian Prime Minister Mark Carney to discuss trade negotiations.
Vatican City	Vatican City	May 18–19	Attended the papal inauguration mass and met with Pope Leo XIV.
Maryland	Annapolis	May 23	Delivered the commencement address at the U.S. Naval Academy, calling for a cautious but strong approach to military engagement.
Virginia	Arlington	May 26	Alongside President Trump, for Memorial Day, Vance participated in a wreath-laying ceremony at the Tomb of the Unknown Soldier at Arlington National Cemetery.
Nevada	Las Vegas	May 28	Participated in the Bitcoin 2025 Conference and held a MAGA fundraiser.

=== June ===
Country/ U.S. state	Areas visited	Dates	Details
Tennessee	Nashville	June 5	Vance traveled to Nashville (coinciding with the start of CMA Fest) and attended a Republican National Committee fundraising event that evening. During this trip he also stopped for dinner at Kid Rock’s newly opened restaurant, “The Detroit Cowboy,” in downtown Nashville.
Montana	Dillon	June 11	Visited the ranch of Rupert Murdoch and spoke with media executives including Lachlan Murdoch.
California	Los Angeles	June 20	Arriving via Los Angeles International Airport, JD Vance met with U.S. Marines and National Guard troops, toured a federal joint operations center amid immigration enforcement protests.
Ohio	Lima	June 24	Vance attended an Ohio Republican Party dinner at the Veterans Memorial Civic Center.

=== July ===
Country/ U.S. state	Areas visited	Dates	Details
South Dakota	Mount Rushmore, Rapid City	July 3	Vance made an unannounced stop at Mount Rushmore ahead of Independence Day, joining South Dakota Governor Larry Rhoden to discuss plans for a Semiquincentennial (250th anniversary) fireworks celebration in 2026. He greeted tourists at the monument and received a formal welcome from Rapid City’s mayor.
North Dakota	Medora	July 4	Vice President Vance and family vacationed in southwestern North Dakota, visiting Theodore Roosevelt National Park.
California	San Diego, Anaheim	July 5–14	Attended the Claremont Institute's 2025 Statesmanship Award dinner. Spent vacations in California, visitig Disneyland.
Pennsylvania	West Pittston	July 16	Attended a rally to promote the “One Big Beautiful Bill” in a machine-shop venue.
New Jersey	Linwood	July 16	On the same day, Vance made an unannounced visit to New Jersey to pay condolences to the family of his chief of staff, Jacob Reses.
Ohio	Canton	July 28	Visited the Metallus steel manufacturing plant in Canton to promote the “One Big Beautiful Bill” and American industry as well as advanced materials innovation.
Wyoming	Jackson Hole	July 29	Headlined a high-dollar GOP fundraiser in Jackson Hole, Wyoming, which raised over $2 million for the RNC.
Montana	Big Sky	July 29	Following the fundraising event in Wyoming, J. D. Vance appeared at a private donor retreat at a ski resort in Big Sky hosted by GOP megadonors, alongside Republican lawmakers.

=== August ===
Country/ U.S. state	Areas visited	Dates	Details
Indiana	Indianapolis	August 7	Vice President Vance held a meeting with Indiana Governor Mike Braun and state legislative leaders in Indianapolis to press for mid-cycle redistricting ahead of the 2026 elections.
United Kingdom	Cotswolds, Kilmarnock	August 7–17	Private trip. Vacationed with his family in the Cotswolds and Scotland. Addressed U.S. troops at RAF Fairford. Met Foreign Secretary David Lammy, Conservative MPs Robert Jenrick and Chris Philp, as well as Reform UK leader Nigel Farage.
Georgia	Peachtree	August 21	Vance spoke at an event in Peachtree City (south of Atlanta) to promote President Trump’s new tax policy, the “One Big Beautiful Bill Act,” and to rally support against Democratic Senator Jon Ossoff ahead of his 2026 re-election bid. The vice president touted the law’s family tax cuts and was joined by several Georgia Republican Senate hopefuls during his campaign-style appearance
Wisconsin	La Crosse	August 28	Visited a steel-fabrication facility to promote the administration’s new tax and spending bill, highlighting domestic manufacturing and economic revitalization efforts.

=== September ===
Country/ U.S. state	Areas visited	Dates	Details
Minnesota	Minneapolis	September 3	Arriving via Minneapolis-Saint Paul International Airport, JD Vance and the Second Lady visited Minneapolis one week after Annunciation Catholic Church shooting to pay respects to the victims. They laid flowers at a memorial outside the church, met privately with families of the two children killed and other survivors, and later visited an injured child at a local hospital.
Utah	Salt Lake City	September 11	Vice President Vance visited the site of Charlie Kirk's assassination and, via Air Force Two, accompanied his casket back to Arizona.
Arizona	Scottsdale	September 11	Vice President Vance visited the site of Charlie Kirk's assassination and, via Air Force Two, accompanied his casket back to Arizona.
Michigan	Howell	September 17	Visited Hatch Stampling plant.
Arizona	Glendale	September 21	Arriving via Luke Air Force Base, Vance attended the funeral of conservative activist Charlie Kirk, who was assassinated earlier in the month.
North Carolina	Concord	September 24	Arriving via Concord–Padgett Regional Airport, Vice President Vance delivered remarks on tax cuts and public-safety policy. During the same visit, he toured a NASCAR team facility.

=== October ===
Country/ U.S. state	Areas visited	Dates	Details
Indiana	Indianapolis	October 8	Vice President Vance traveled to Indianapolis to meet with Indiana Senate Republicans amid a stalled push for redistricting.
Kentucky	Covington	October 17	Vance, accompanied by Second Lady Usha Vance and their children, attended Sunday Mass at St. Mary’s Cathedral Basilica of the Assumption and unexpectedly greeted a just-married couple outside the church.
California	San Diego, Camp Pendleton	October 17–19	Vice President Vance visited Marine Corps Base Camp Pendleton for the Marine Corps 250th Birthday Beach Bash and delivered remarks to troops.
Israel	Jerusalem, Tel Aviv	October 21–23	Vice President Vance and Second Lady Usha Vance visited Israel to support the implementation of the Gaza ceasefire. He met with U.S. envoys Steve Witkoff and Jared Kushner at Ben Gurion Airport, Israeli Prime Minister Benjamin Netanyahu, President Isaac Herzog, and families of hostages. He also visited the Church of the Holy Sepulchre and observed Gaza from the HaKirya in Tel Aviv.
Mississippi	Oxford	October 29	Attended a Turning Point USA event at the University of Mississippi with Erika Kirk, widow of Charlie Kirk.

=== November ===
Country/ U.S. state	Areas visited	Dates	Details
Texas	Austin, San Antonio	November 7–8	On November 7, Vance headlined the Texas Republican Party’s “Victory Dinner” in Austin. On November 8 he visited Lackland Air Force Base in San Antonio to meet with troops and tour new border-security training facilities.
Maryland	Bethesda	November 10	On the eve of Veterans Day, Vice President Vance visited military personnel at Walter Reed National Military Medical Center.
Virginia	Arlington	November 11	Alongside President Trump on Veterans Day, Vice President Vance participated in a wreath-laying ceremony at the Tomb of the Unknown Soldier in Arlington National Cemetery and delivered brief remarks at the Memorial Amphitheater.
Pennsylvania	Monroeville	November 21	Vice President Vance visited a small-business manufacturing plant outside Pittsburgh to highlight the administration’s latest tariff adjustments and promote the “America First Trade Policy.”
Kentucky	Fort Campbell	November 26	Accompanied by Second Lady Usha Vance and their children, Vice President JD Vance met with American soldiers and served an early Thanksgiving meal before delivering remarks.
Ohio	Cincinnati	November 26–27	Returned briefly to Cincinnati for Thanksgiving with family; no public events.

=== December ===
Country/ U.S. state	Areas visited	Dates	Details
New York	New York City	December 3	Vice President Vance attended a fundraising event for the Republican National Committee in Manhattan and met with business leaders to discuss economic policies.
Florida	Miami, Palm Beach	December 6–7	On December 6, Vance spoke at a conservative conference in Miami on foreign policy. On December 7, he visited Mar-a-Lago to confer with President Trump on upcoming legislative priorities.
California	Los Angeles	December 10	Vice President Vance toured a tech innovation hub in Los Angeles and delivered remarks on regulating artificial intelligence and big tech companies.
Michigan	Detroit	December 14	Vance attended a roundtable with auto industry workers in Detroit to promote the administration's trade deals and manufacturing incentives.
Ohio	Columbus	December 16	Returned to Ohio for a brief visit to the state capital; met with local officials on infrastructure projects; no major public events.
Pennsylvania	Alburtis	December 16	Arriving via Lehigh Valley International Airport, Vice President Vance delivered remarks on the economy at a Uline warehouse.
Arizona	Phoenix	December 21	Vice President Vance delivered remarks at AmericaFest 2025 at the Phoenix Convention Center.

== 2026 ==
=== January ===
Country/ U.S. state	Areas visited	Dates	Details
Ohio	Toledo	January 22	Vice President Vance delivered remarks at Midwest Terminals.
Minnesota	Minneapolis	January 22	Vice President Vance visited Minneapolis, where he held a roundtable with local leaders and community members and delivered remarks on restoring law and order in the state.
Florida	Naples, Miami Beach	January 28	Vice President Vance attended a fundraising event at the Naples Yacht Club. He later attended a private fundraising dinner on the Venetian Islands in Miami Beach.

=== February ===
Country/ U.S. state	Areas visited	Dates	Details
Italy	Milan	February 4–9	Arriving via Milan Malpensa Airport, along with his family and joined by Secretary of State Marco Rubio and ambassador Tilman Fertitta, Vice President Vance went in Milan to support Team USA for the 2026 Winter Olympics. On Thursday, he attended the USA vs. Czechia women's hockey game and the IOC gala dinner. On Friday, he attended a bilateral meeting with Italian Prime Minister Giorgia Meloni at Palazzo Diotti. Then, he visited the Pinacoteca di Brera art museum. He was later hosted by Italian President Sergio Mattarella at a dinner for world leaders, before attending the 2026 Winter Olympics opening ceremony at San Siro, where the Vice President was booed. On Saturday, JD Vance attended the USA vs. Finland women's hockey game with social media influencer and boxer Jake Paul.
Armenia	Yerevan	February 9–10	In the context of the border crisis with Azerbaijan, Vice President Vance held a bilateral meeting with Prime Minister Nikol Pashinyan. Armenia is a country where no sitting U.S. president or vice president has visited before.
Azerbaijan	Baku	February 10–11	In the context of the border crisis with Armenia, Vice President Vance held a bilateral meeting with President Ilham Aliyev. Azerbaijan is a country where no sitting U.S. president or vice president has visited before.

=== March ===
Country/ U.S. state	Areas visited	Dates	Details
Delaware	Dover	March 7	Vice President Vance attended the dignified transfer at Dover Air Force Base of the bodies of the six US soldiers killed in the Iran war.
North Carolina	Rocky Mount	March 13	Vice President Vance delivered remarks at The Power House.
Michigan	Auburn Hills	March 18	Vice President Vance delivered remarks at Engineering Design Services Inc.
Texas	Austin, Dallas	March 23–24	Vice President Vance attended RNC fundraisers in Austin and Dallas.
Tennessee	Nashville	March 30	Vice President Vance attended the Rockbridge Network spring summit at the Four Seasons Hotel Nashville.

=== April ===
Country/ U.S. state	Areas visited	Dates	Details
Hungary	Budapest	April 7–8	Vice President Vance held bilateral meetings with Prime Minister Viktor Orbán ahead of the 2026 Hungarian parliamentary election.
Pakistan	Islamabad	April 11–12	Vice President Vance led US delegation, including Jared Kushner and Steve Witkoff, to negotiate with Iran in the Islamabad Talks.
Georgia	Athens	April 14	Vice President Vance attended a Turning Point USA event at the University of Georgia.

=== May ===
Country/ U.S. state	Areas visited	Dates	Details
Ohio	Cincinnati	May 5	Arriving via Cincinnati/Northern Kentucky International Airport, Vice President Vance voted in Ohio's primary election at St. Anthony of Padua church.
Oklahoma	Oklahoma City	May 5	Arriving via OKC Will Rogers International Airport, Vice President Vance attended an RNC fundraiser at Devon Energy Center.
Iowa	Des Moines	May 5	Arriving via Des Moines International Airport, Vice President Vance campaigned with Congressman Zach Nunn at Ex-Guard Industries.
Ohio	Cincinnati	May 8–10	Vice President Vance visited Cincinnati for the weekend.
Maine	Bangor	May 14	Vice President Vance delivered remarks about fraud at Bangor International Airport at a Maine Republican Party event, campaigning for Paul LePage.
Missouri	Kansas City	May 18	Arriving via Kansas City International Airport, Vice President Vance delivered remarks at Milbank Manufacturing Company.
Virginia	Arlington	May 25	Vice President Vance attended the Armed Forces Full Honor Wreath Ceremony at Arlington National Cemetery, followed by the National Memorial Day Observance in the Memorial Amphitheater.
Colorado	Colorado Springs	May 28	Vice President Vance delivered the Air Force Academy's commencement speech at Falcon Stadium.

=== June ===
Country/ U.S. state	Areas visited	Dates	Details
New York	New York City	June 16	Vice President Vance appeared in studio on The View to promote his new memoir, Communion: Finding My Way Back to Faith.
Switzerland	Bürgenstock	June 21–22	Vice President Vance engaged in talks with a delegation of Iran after the signing of the Islamabad Memorandum.
California	San Diego, Yorba Linda, Palo Alto	June 23–26	Vice President Vance visited San Diego with Second Lady Usha Vance. He also spoke at the Richard Nixon Presidential Library to promote his new memoir, Communion: Finding My Way Back to Faith. He also attended an RNC fundraiser in Palo Alto.

=== July ===
Country/ U.S. state	Areas visited	Dates	Details
Virginia	Virginia Beach	July 1	Vice President Vance delivered remarks at Naval Air Station Oceana.
Wisconsin	Milwaukee	July 8	Vice President Vance delivered remarks at the 128th Air Refueling Wing.

=== August ===
Country/ U.S. state	Areas visited	Dates	Details
New York	Southampton	August 19	Vice President Vance headlined a Republican National Committee fundraiser.
Ohio	Middletown	August 21	Vice President Vance delivered remarks at Cleveland-Cliffs Middletown Works.
Maine	Brewer	August 24	Vice President Vance delivered remarks at Compotech's Brewer headquarters.
Michigan	Sterling Heights	August 31	Vice President Vance spoke at a MAGA Inc. event, featuring Mike Rogers, John James, Lisa McClain, and other candidates.
Nevada	Las Vegas	August 31	Vice President Vance delivered an address at the Republican Jewish Coalition annual summit.

=== September ===
Country/ U.S. state	Areas visited	Dates	Details
Texas	Dallas	September 9–10	Vice President Vance spoke at and attended the 2026 Republican National Convention.
New York	New York City	September 11	Vice President Vance attended a ceremony at Ground Zero commemorating the 25th anniversary of the September 11 attacks.
Kansas	Olathe	September 14	Vice President Vance visited Webco Manufacturing Inc. to campaign for Senator Roger Marshall.
Iowa	Council Bluffs	September 18	Vice President Vance spoke at a RNC midterm rally at the Mid-America Center.
North Carolina	Greensboro	September 21	Vice President Vance campaigned with Michael Whatley.
Texas	Harlingen	September 30	Vice President Vance spoke at a midterm rally at the Harlingen Convention Center.

=== October ===
Country/ U.S. state	Areas visited	Dates	Details
Florida	Lakeland	October 1	Vice President Vance held a midterm rally to campaign for gubernatorial candidate Byron Donalds.
Alaska	Fairbanks	October 5	Vice President Vance held a midterm rally at Fairbanks International Airport.
Ohio	Norwood, Lima	October 9	Vice President Vance voted at the Hamilton County Board of Elections before holding a midterm rally at Lima Allen County Airport.
Texas	Tyler	October 13	Vice President Vance held a midterm rally at Tyler Pounds Regional Airport.
Georgia	Atlanta	October 14	Vice President Vance met with supporters at Hartsfield–Jackson Atlanta International Airport.
Michigan	Monroe	October 15	Vice President Vance held a midterm rally at LevelUp Training Complex.
North Carolina	Hendersonville	October 19	Vice President Vance held a midterm rally at B & A Hyder Trucking Co.
Ohio	Cincinnati	October 21	Vice President Vance held a midterm rally with Vivek Ramaswamy and Jon Husted at the Sharonville Convention Center.
Nebraska	North Platte	October 22	Vice President Vance held a midterm rally at the D&N Event Center.
Montana	Belgrade	October 26	Vice President Vance held a midterm rally at Bozeman Yellowstone International Airport.
Kansas	Topeka	October 26	Vice President Vance held a midterm rally at HME, Inc.
Michigan	Howell	October 27	Vice President Vance held a midterm rally at CHI Aviation.
North Carolina	Kinston	October 28	Vice President Vance held a midterm rally at Kinston Regional Jetport.
Texas	Weatherford	October 29	Vice President Vance held a midterm rally at JRJ Construction.

=== November ===
Country/ U.S. state	Areas visited	Dates	Details
New York	Rome	November 2	Vice President Vance held a midterm rally at Griffiss International Airport.
Ohio	Toledo	November 2	Vice President Vance held a midterm rally at Toledo Express Airport.
Virginia	Arlington	November 11	Alongside President Trump on Veterans Day, Vice President Vance participated in a wreath-laying ceremony at the Tomb of the Unknown Soldier in Arlington National Cemetery and delivered remarks at the Memorial Amphitheater.
North Carolina	New Bern	November 12	Vice President Vance attended the Marine Corps Birthday Ball at the Riverfront Convention Center.
Ohio	Middletown	November 17	Vice President Vance visited Garver Family Farm Market.

== Scheduled or anticipated future trips ==
Country/ U.S. state	Areas visited	Dates	Details
Arizona	Phoenix	December 20	Vice President Vance plans to deliver remarks at AmericaFest 2026 at the Phoenix Convention Center.

== See also ==
- Vice presidency of JD Vance
- Second presidency of Donald Trump
- List of international presidential trips made by Donald Trump
  - List of presidential trips made by Donald Trump (2025)
  - List of presidential trips made by Donald Trump (2026)
  - List of presidential trips made by Donald Trump (2027)
  - List of presidential trips made by Donald Trump (2028–29)
