= Scott Speicher =

American navy pilot (1957–1991)

Michael Scott Speicher
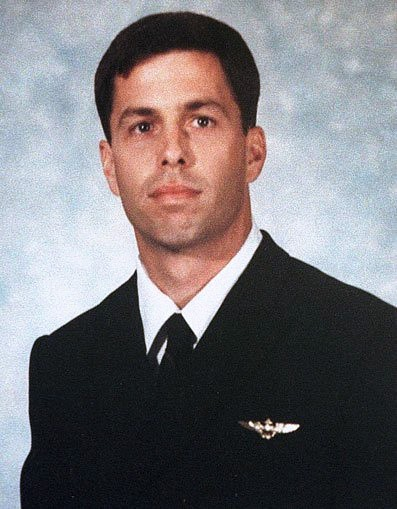
- Speicher in 1990
- Born: July 12, 1957; Kansas City, Missouri, U.S.
- Died: January 17, 1991 (aged 33); Tulul ad Dulaym, Al Anbar Governorate, Iraq
- Burial place: Jacksonville Memory Gardens, Orange Park, Florida, U.S.
- Military career
- Allegiance: United States
- Branch: United States Navy
- Rank: Captain (posthumous)
- Unit: VFA-81 Sunliners
- Conflicts: Persian Gulf War: Operation Desert Storm †
- Awards: Purple Heart

Michael Scott Speicher (July 12, 1957 – January 17, 1991) was a naval aviator in the United States Navy who was shot down over Iraq during the Persian Gulf War becoming the first American combat casualty of the war. His fate was not known until 2 August 2009, when the U.S. Navy reported that Speicher's remains had been found in Iraq by the United States military. He is also the most recent American to have been shot down in air-to-air combat.

== Early life and education ==
Michael Scott Speicher was born in Kansas City, Missouri, on 12 July 1957. Scott and his sister went to Lakewood Elementary School and Eastgate Middle School before attending Winnetonka High School.

When Speicher was 15, his family moved to Jacksonville, Florida, where he attended Nathan Bedford Forrest High School. After graduating from high school, he then attended Florida State University (FSU). Speicher graduated from FSU in 1980 with a bachelor's degree in accounting and business management. While at Florida State, he met Joanne, whom he eventually married, and they had two children. Eighteen months after Speicher went missing in the 1991 Persian Gulf War, friend and fellow U.S. Navy pilot Buddy Harris married Joanne. They had two children.

Speicher's father had been a fighter pilot in World War II. Speicher went on his first airplane flight when he was five years old. Speicher was a cadet member of the Civil Air Patrol as a teenager. Upon graduation from FSU, Speicher joined the U.S. Navy and attended Aviation Officer Candidate School at Naval Air Station Pensacola, Florida. After flight training at various bases, he was designated as a naval aviator and spent several years as both a fleet squadron aviator in the A-7 Corsair II and F/A-18 Hornet and as a flight instructor on the F/A-18.

By the early 1990s, Speicher had attained the rank of lieutenant commander and was stationed at NAS Cecil Field near Jacksonville, Florida. He was assigned to Strike Fighter Squadron Eighty One (VFA-81 Sunliners), deploying with Carrier Air Wing 17 (CVW-17) aboard the aircraft carrier USS Saratoga. At the time of his deployment to the Iraq theater, Speicher and his wife had a 3-year-old daughter and 1-year-old son.

== Loss incident ==
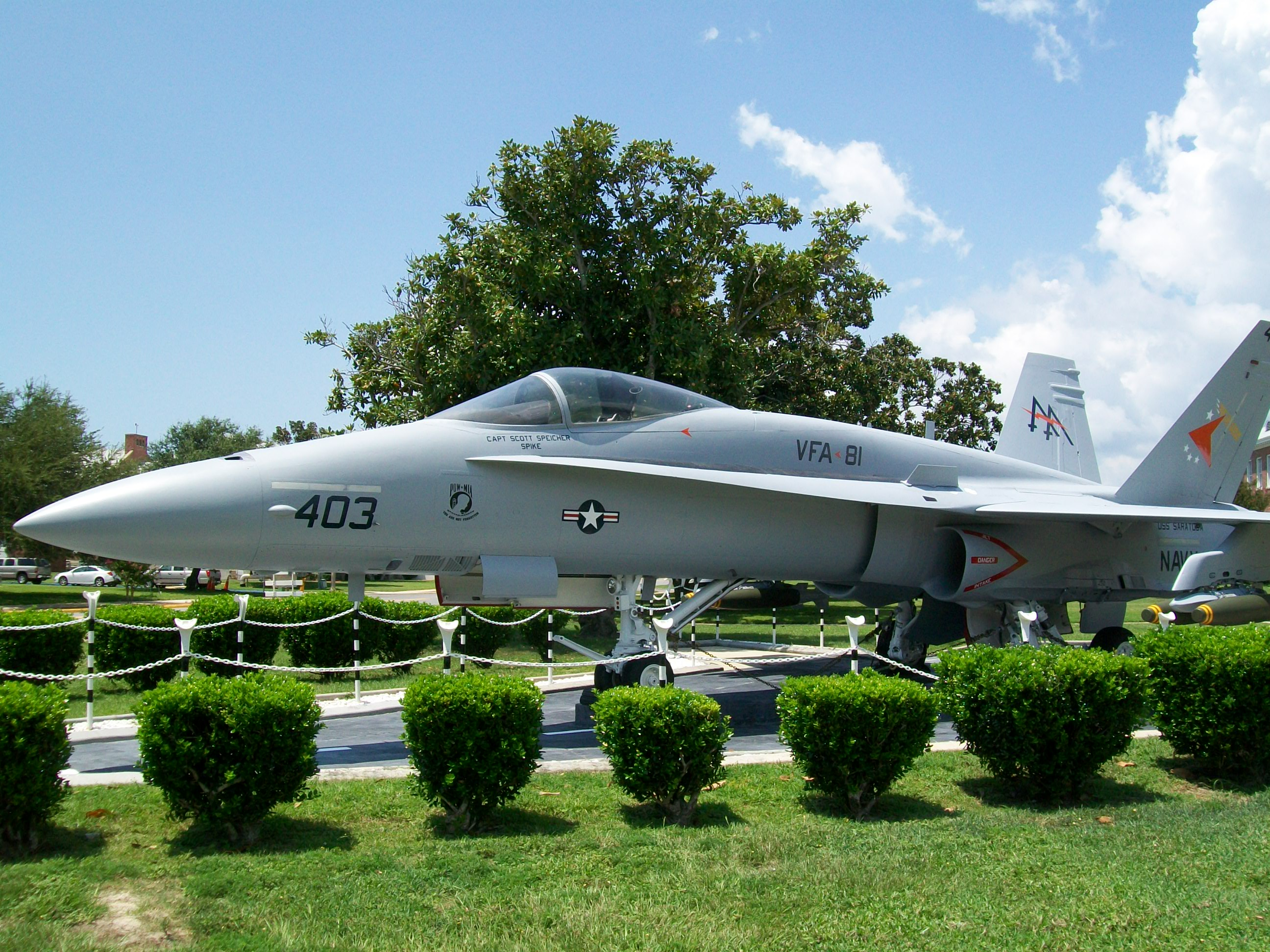
F/A-18 Hornet resembling Speicher's aircraft on static display at NAS Pensacola

Speicher was flying an F/A-18 Hornet fighter, BuNo 163484, when he was shot down by Iraqi Air Force (IQAF) aircraft 100 miles west of Baghdad, in the early hours of 17 January 1991, the first night of Operation Desert Storm. His plane crashed in a remote, uninhabited wasteland known as Tulul ad Dulaym at 33°14′35.81″N 42°21′18.14″E. He was the first combat casualty for American forces in the war.

The U.S. Navy maintained in a 1997 document that Speicher was downed by a surface-to-air missile. However, an unclassified summary of a 2001 CIA report suggests that Speicher's aircraft was shot down by a missile fired from an Iraqi aircraft, most likely a MiG-25, flown by Lieutenant Zuhair Dawoud Al-Tamimi, 96th squadron of the IQAF. Speicher was at 28,000 feet and travelling at 0.92 Mach (540 knots) when the front of the aircraft suffered a catastrophic event. The impact from the R-40 missile threw the aircraft laterally off its flight path between fifty and sixty degrees with a resulting 6 g minimum load. A pilot on the same mission stated: "I'm telling you right now, don't believe what you're being told. It was that MiG that shot Spike down."

== Status and investigations ==
=== 1990s ===
The day after the shoot-down, Speicher was placed on MIA status. On 22 May 1991, after the end of the Gulf War, Speicher's status was changed to killed in action, body not recovered (KIA/BNR). Navy Commander Buddy Harris, who was a friend and fellow naval aviator of Speicher's, became a strong advocate for searching for Speicher, often meeting with U.S. officials.

In December 1993, a military official from Qatar discovered the wreckage of a plane in the desert, which was subsequently identified as Speicher's aircraft. The canopy was a good distance from the rest of the aircraft, suggesting Speicher had tried to eject. In April 1994, a U.S. satellite photographed apparent human-made symbols on the desert floor near the wreck's location, which might possibly be Speicher's E & E (Escape and Evade) sign, suggesting that Speicher might have survived the crash. A covert American operation to inspect the site was considered, but rejected by Chairman of the Joint Chiefs of Staff, General John Shalikashvili, as too risky.

In December 1995, working through the International Committee of the Red Cross, investigators from the U.S. Navy and U.S. Army's Central Identification Laboratory went to Iraq and conducted an excavation of the crash site. Bedouin nomads gave investigators a flight uniform that was likely Speicher's, with his name supposedly cut out of it, but the investigators concluded it had been planted there. Other evidence led investigators to further conclude Speicher had likely ejected, and was not in the plane at the time it crashed. In September 1996, the Secretary of the Navy in a new review reaffirmed the presumptive finding of death.

In 1997, a U.S. Department of Defense document leaked to The New York Times showed that the Pentagon had not been forthcoming with information previously requested by U.S. Senator Rod Grams of Minnesota. Senator Grams publicly accused the Pentagon of misleading him, and joined with Senator Bob Smith of New Hampshire in calling for an investigation by the Senate Intelligence Committee. The Speicher case was taken up by the National Alliance of Families, which had been quite active in the Vietnam War POW/MIA issue. Speculative theories were developed as to the circumstances of Speicher's shoot-down, and assuming he was still alive, why the U.S. military might not want to find him and why Iraq might not want to return him.

=== 2000s ===
In January 2001, the Secretary of the Navy changed Speicher's status to "missing in action". This was the first time the Defense Department had ever made such a change. In conjunction with the change in classification, Speicher was promoted to commander, in accordance with U.S. Navy practice for POWs held a long time. The 2001 CIA report stated that he may have survived by ejecting. Rumors from Iraq said that Speicher was captive, walked with a limp, and had facial scars. In July 2002, Speicher was further promoted to Captain.

Speicher's possible situation became a more high-profile issue in the build-up to war. In March 2002, The Washington Times ran five successive front-page articles about it, National Review Online ran a long piece on it, and on 12 September 2002, President George W. Bush mentioned Speicher in a speech to the United Nations General Assembly as part of his case for war against Iraq. Senator Bill Nelson of Florida also took a strong interest in the case. Speicher's status was changed again to "missing/captured" on 11 October 2002, one day after the United States Congress authorized the use of military force in Iraq. Then-U.S. Secretary of the Navy Gordon R. England said, "While the information available to me now does not prove definitively that Commander Speicher is alive and in Iraqi custody, I am personally convinced the Iraqis seized him sometime after his plane went down. Further, it is my firm belief that the government of Iraq knows what happened to Cmdr. Speicher."

Upon the 2003 invasion of Iraq in March 2003, a major investigation on the ground began, that also further increased public attention to the matter. In April 2003, Speicher's possible initials were discovered in a cell at Hakmiyah prison in Baghdad. Investigators did not think it was significant because a similar carving of "MJN" was found directly above the "MSS" scrawl. Subsequent tests on hair found in the cell's drain did not match Speicher's DNA. Senator Nelson went to Iraq to visit the prison personally. Speicher's name was also found on a document in Iraq, dated January 2003, that had the names of prisoners being held in the country. Officials stated that the 90-page document offered no evidence of whether Speicher was alive and might have been written either to provide an accounting of former Iraqi POWs or to confuse the U.S. military.

Over time, as the U.S. occupation increasingly gained control over Anbar Province, the Pentagon said that Speicher probably was not captured.

On 5 January 2009, the U.S. Navy held a review board to consider officially closing the case. The review board recommended that the Pentagon continue investigating what happened to Speicher. The recommendation went to Secretary of the Navy Donald C. Winter who had the final decision. Speicher's family believed and was worried that would change the status of Captain Speicher to KIA and declared they would oppose such action.

On 10 March 2009, the Secretary of the Navy declared that Captain Speicher's status was changed from "Missing/Captured" back to "Missing-in-Action."

=== Discovery and positive identification ===
On 2 August 2009, the Navy reported that Speicher's remains were found in Iraq by United States Marines from 3rd Battalion, 3rd Marines. His jawbone was used to identify him after study at the Charles C. Carson Center for Mortuary Affairs at Dover Air Force Base. According to local civilians, Speicher was buried by Bedouins after his plane was shot down. Senator Nelson attributed the delayed finding to the culture of the locality: "These Bedouins roam around in the desert, they don't stay in one place, and it just took this time to find the specific site."

Speicher's family expressed gratitude that the Defense Department had stayed with the case and that closure was now available. The Christian Science Monitor termed the case "a veritable saga punctuated with hope, uncertainty, and despair for the past 18 years."

== Legacy ==
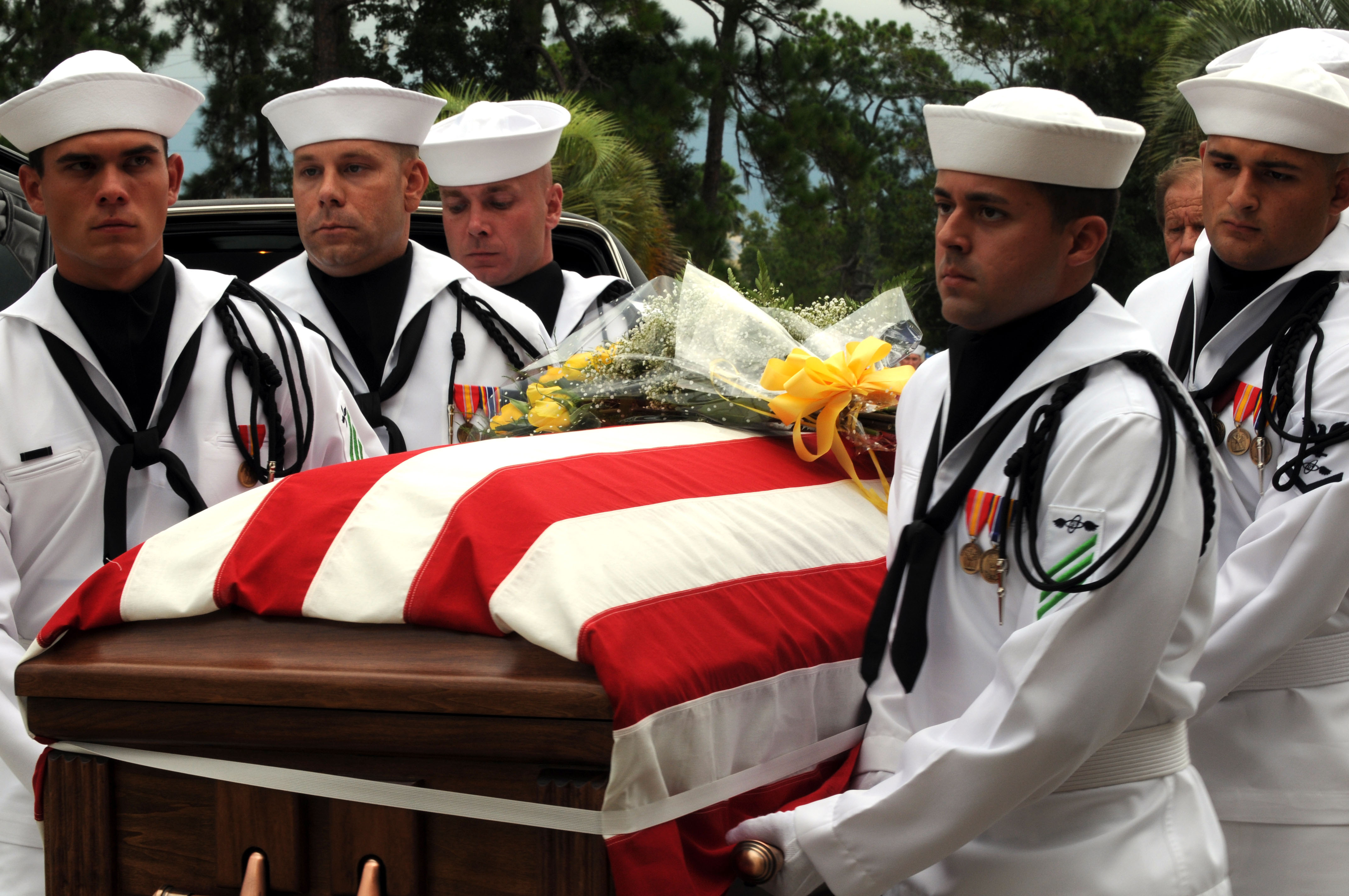
Sailors from a U.S. Navy honor guard carry Speicher's remains to All Saints Chapel at NAS Jacksonville, Florida in August 2009.

Florida State University named its tennis center after Speicher, an avid player. The $1.2 million Scott Speicher Tennis Complex was completed in 2003. In 2018, FSU President John Thrasher joined members of Speicher’s family to unveil a new memorial honoring Speicher. The memorial, located at the entrance of the tennis facility named after him in 1993, features a bronze Navy pilot’s helmet and oxygen mask and will eventually include a bronze Navy G-1 flight jacket and naval officer's khaki garrison cap similar to what Speicher would have worn.

A memorial statue and plaque were erected on Naval Air Station Cecil Field and dedicated to him. The Naval Air Station has since been deactivated but the facility remains in operation as a joint civil–military airport.

A memorial head marker dedicated to Speicher stood in Section H of Arlington National Cemetery in Virginia as of 2002. The memorial markers are erected when there are no identifiable remains for an individual whose death has been substantiated. Cemetery policy states that if remains are later recovered, the head marker will be interred with the coffin.

In effort to honor Speicher, a former Iraqi air base in the northern Iraqi city of Tikrit was renamed COB Speicher.

A U.S. Navy F/A-18 Hornet on display outside the Naval Aviation Schools Command at NAS Pensacola, Florida, was dedicated to the Speicher family in May 2009. The aircraft was painted in the markings of United States Navy squadron VFA-81 "Sunliners" and USS Saratoga, which was Speicher's squadron and ship when he was shot down. A front-page story in the 7 August 2009 issue of the Naval Air Station Pensacola newspaper Gosport describes how Speicher's remains were discovered and identified after 18 years. The story has a photo of Speicher's children talking with a member of VFA-81 next to the plane.

On 13 August 2009, the remains of Captain Speicher arrived in Florida 18 years after having been shot down in the Persian Gulf War. The plane containing his remains touched down at Naval Air Station Jacksonville at 3 p.m. Thousands of friends and family gathered for his burial. Captain Speicher's final resting place is at the Jacksonville Memory Garden located in Orange Park, Florida.

On 7 September 2009, Captain Speicher was honored at the start of the Florida State University football game against the University of Miami at Bobby Bowden Field at Doak Campbell Stadium when a flight of F/A-18s performed the missing man formation.

On Memorial Day 2010, an American flag and a wooden cross bearing his name were commissioned, adding him to the Clay County Florida Parade of Flags.

=== Family ===
Speicher was married to JoAnne and they had two children.

In the early months and years after Speicher's incident over Iraq, JoAnne Speicher was supported by Speicher's friend, "Buddy" Harris. Eventually, the two became a couple and married. Harris took her two children as his own, after which the couple had two more children. Harris was a significant voice for action to settle the details of Speicher's death, and has been an ongoing voice for POWs and MIAs.

== See also ==
- Missing in action
- Operation Desert Storm
- Mortuary Affairs
- Charles C. Carson Center for Mortuary Affairs

== Bibliography ==
- Yarsinske, Amy Waters (2002). No One Left Behind: The Lt. Comdr. Michael Scott Speicher Story. Dutton Adult. ISBN 0-525-94687-X.
- Yarsinske, Amy Waters. An American in the Basement. The Betrayal of Captain Scott Speicher and the Cover-up of His Death.
