= List of non-profit organizations in Jacksonville, Florida =

Following is a list of notable non-profit organizations headquartered in the city of Jacksonville, Florida.

- Jacksonville University
- Alfred I. duPont Testamentary Trust
- Alliance for the Lost Boys of Sudan Florida
- Baptist Health
- Boselli Foundation
- Brothers Fighting Against Mental Health
- Clara White Mission
- Communities In Schools of Jacksonville
- Community Hospice of Northeast Florida
- Dreams Come True
- FreshMinistries
- Gator Bowl Association
- HabiJax
- Hubbard House
- Jacksonville Arboretum & Gardens
- Jacksonville Civic Council
- Jacksonville Urban League
- MaliVai Washington Kids Foundation
- Nemours Children's Clinic
- Otis Smith Kids Foundation
- The Queer Trans Project
- Second Harvest North Florida
- St. Vincent's HealthCare
- Sulzbacher Center
- Tom Coughlin Jay Fund Foundation
- UF Health Jacksonville
