= Graves Registration =

Graves Registration may refer to:

- The Graves Registration Service, a group within the United States Department of Defense Quartermaster Corps
- The Graves Registration Commission, a British Commonwealth commission
