= Boselli Foundation =

U.S. non-profit organization

- Formation: 1995
- Headquarters: Jacksonville, Florida, United States
- Revenue: $640,349 (2015)
- Expenses: $561,977 (2015)
- Website: www.bosellifoundation.com

The Boselli Foundation is a 501(c)(3) non-profit organization based in Jacksonville, Florida. It is intended to provide academic and athletic support for local children, especially those with limited financial resources. Founded in 1995 by Tony Boselli, the first player drafted by the Jacksonville Jaguars, and his wife Angi, it is one of the older "celebrity" charitable foundations in the First Coast area and replaces programs started by the now defunct Otis Smith Kids Foundation.

In 1997, Boselli was named the Jaguars True Value NFL Man of the Year for his community involvement with the Boselli Foundation. "Helping children become champions at home, school, and in the community" is the focus of all programs provided by The Boselli Foundation.

== Activities ==
- The annual holiday Shop with a Jock event.
- The Most Valuable Teacher Award (M.V.T.) was established in 1997 to recognize excellence in local public educators. The 2000 winner was Michelle Gaskins of Englewood High School, who received a $10,000 grant. Joey Wiles of St. Augustine High School and Tim Worsowicz of Forrest High School received $5,000 grants.
- Christian Scholar-Athlete College Scholarships - On May 19, 2001, 10 full-tuition, four-year college scholarships were presented.
- Youth Life Learning Center - The first one was created at Simonds Johnson Park on the Northside during the summer of 2007. The foundation rehabilitated the existing community center which had been vandalized, covered with graffiti and closed down. Work on a second facility was begun in July, 2008 at Russell Bill Cook Park in the eastside neighborhood downtown. The Boselli Foundation teamed up with Builders Care and Engle Homes to renovate the current building and put up a 1,000-square-foot (93 m^{2}) building next door.
