= Otis Smith (basketball) =

American basketball player (born 1964)

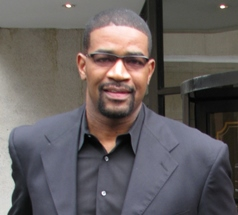
- Smith at the Air Canada Centre in 2008

Personal information
- Born: January 30, 1964 (age 62) Jacksonville, Florida, U.S.
- Listed height: 6 ft 5 in (1.96 m)
- Listed weight: 210 lb (95 kg)

Career information
- High school: Nathan Bedford Forrest (Jacksonville, Florida)
- College: Jacksonville (1982–1986)
- NBA draft: 1986: 2nd round, 41st overall pick
- Drafted by: Denver Nuggets
- Playing career: 1986–1997
- Position: Shooting guard / small forward
- Number: 22, 18, 32
- Coaching career: 2014–2018

Career history

Playing
- 1986–1987: Denver Nuggets
- 1987–1989: Golden State Warriors
- 1989–1992: Orlando Magic
- 1996–1997: Solna Vikings

Career highlights
- First-team All-Sun Belt (1986); 3× Second-team All-Sun Belt (1983–1985); No. 32 retired by Jacksonville Dolphins

Career NBA statistics
- Points: 3,951 (10.5 ppg)
- Rebounds: 1,416 (3.8 rpg)
- Stats at NBA.com
- Stats at Basketball Reference

Otis Fitzgerald Smith (born January 30, 1964) is an American former professional basketball player who played six seasons in the National Basketball Association (NBA). He played college basketball for the Jacksonville Dolphins.

== Personal life ==
Smith was born and raised in Jacksonville, Florida and was a star athlete at Forrest High School, graduating in 1982. Smith is married to Shanta "Tae" Smith. Smith has four children Chris, Otis II,Kamari & Alex.

== College career ==
Smith played at Jacksonville University from 1982 to 1986 and earned a degree in marketing and management. He became the only player in school history to tally more than 1,700 points and 900 rebounds in his collegiate career. In 1986, he was named the Sun Belt Conference men's basketball tournament MVP. His jersey was retired at Jacksonville University in 2002.

== Professional career ==
Smith was taken with the 17th pick in the second round of the 1986 NBA draft out of Jacksonville University by the Denver Nuggets. He played one full season and part of a second with the Nuggets before being traded to the Golden State Warriors during the 1987-88 season. He played the remainder of that season and the 1988-89 season with the Warriors. He participated in the 1988 NBA Slam Dunk Contest, where he finished 4th overall, and also in the 1991 contest, where he finished in 7th place.

Otis Smith became a member of the Orlando Magic on June 15, 1989, as one of the 12 players selected in the 1989 NBA expansion draft. He was on the roster for the team's inaugural game in the 1989-90 season, and he played there through the 1991-92 season. He posted career highs of 13.9 points per game and 5.2 rebounds per game in 1991 with the Magic. Smith retired with a knee injury after his sixth season, playing in 375 games, with career averages of 10.5 points per game, 3.8 rebounds per game, and 1.8 assists per game.

After taking a hiatus for three years, Smith came out of player retirement in October, 1996 to sign with the Solna Vikings in the Sweden Professional League. He was named MVP of Swedish League in 1997, but decided to leave on a high note and not play a second year.

== After playing ==
Smith became Director of Community Relations for the Orlando Magic from 1996 to 1998, then was Vice President of Marketing & Community Relations for Boys & Girls Club of Central Florida for a year from 1998 to 1999. However, he missed basketball, and joined the Golden State Warriors Foundation as executive director of Community Relations from 1999 to August 2002. During the 2002–2003 season, he worked as executive director of basketball operations for Golden State. Returning to Florida, he spent two years as director of player development for the Magic, then was promoted to Co-General Manager for 2005–2006 season. He was named general manager of the Orlando Magic on May 3, 2006. He was then named Executive/President of Orlando Magic He agreed to step down from his job as the president and general manager of the Orlando Magic on May 21, 2012, after he was informed his close friend & coach Stan Van Gundy would be terminated. Sources say Otis F. Smith stood in loyalty for his friend Stan Van Gundy by walking away from Orlando Magic with not desiring players to run the team but allowing Management to do so. Sources say: This occurrence was in the time frame of Dwight Howard. Otis Smith was head coach of Grand Rapids Drive for two years as he desired to help players find what was missing to gain pro status. Smith was then employed in a dual role of Assistant Coach/Head of Player Development with Detroit Pistons. Otis Smith worked as an consultant for the Houston Rockets 2020-2023 and is now employed as a Management Consultant for an undisclosed NBA team 2023-2025.

== Executive and coaching career ==
As a former NBA player, Otis Smith has been a coach, Orlando Magic president and general manager, NBA G-League Head Coach, entrepreneur and philanthropist. In 2006 Otis F. Smith Sr. was named general manager of the Orlando Magic, soon after was promoted to president. On September 3, 2014, Smith was named the head coach of the Grand Rapids Drive of the NBA Development League, where he remained for two years. However sources state: Smith & Stan Van Gundy had first discussed the position of general manager within the Pistons organization prior to coaching. As of 2016, Otis Smith was assuming a dual role with Detroit Pistons as assistant coach and director of player development, after joining the franchise as NBA G-League head coach. In 2017, the Sacramento Kings offered Otis Smith a vice president of basketball operations role but he declined by withdrawing his name from consideration to stay and assist his close friend Van Gundy in Detroit. After Van Gundy was relieved of his duties, Otis Smith joined the Houston Rockets on a management consulting basis.

== Civic work ==
Otis Smith became involved with Volunteers for Youth, Big Brothers Big Sisters, and the Boys and Girls Clubs of America when he was in college. In 1989, he founded the Otis F. Smith Foundation (later renamed, the Otis Smith Kids Foundation) which started out conducting free basketball clinics, but grew to include free summer day camps, tutoring, field trips, and health screenings. Otis F. Smith Sr. donated and contributed involvement to the Grand Rapids Community with under privileged children through organizations including Safe-Haven, Family Promise of Grand Rapids & GRCS Public Schools.

== Career statistics ==
Legend
GP	Games played	GS	Games started	MPG	Minutes per game
FG%	Field goal percentage	3P%	3-point field goal percentage	FT%	Free throw percentage
RPG	Rebounds per game	APG	Assists per game	SPG	Steals per game
BPG	Blocks per game	PPG	Points per game	**Bold**	Career high

=== NBA ===
==== Regular season ====
Year	Team	GP	GS	MPG	FG%	3P%	FT%	RPG	APG	SPG	BPG	PPG
1986–87	Denver	28	0	6.0	.418	.000	.571	1.2	.8	.0	.0	2.8
1987–88	Denver	15	6	12.7	.398	–	.750	2.0	.7	.3	.4	6.3
1987–88	Golden State	57	12	23.8	**.506**	.317	.781	3.8	**2.5**	**1.5**	.6	13.1
1988–89	Golden State	**80**	5	20.0	.435	.189	**.798**	4.1	1.8	1.1	.5	10.0
1989–90	Orlando	65	35	**25.3**	.492	.250	.761	4.6	2.3	1.2	**.9**	13.5
1990–91	Orlando	75	**39**	25.1	.451	.196	.734	**5.2**	2.3	1.1	.5	**13.9**
1991–92	Orlando	55	5	15.9	.365	**.381**	.769	2.1	1.0	.7	.2	5.6
Career		375	102	20.6	.455	.251	.762	3.8	1.8	1.0	.5	10.5

==== Playoffs ====
Year	Team	GP	GS	MPG	FG%	3P%	FT%	RPG	APG	SPG	BPG	PPG
1987	Denver	3	3	6.3	.333	–	**.667**	1.7	1.3	.0	**.7**	3.3
1989	Golden State	**4**	0	**12.3**	**.375**	–	.500	**3.3**	**1.5**	**.5**	.3	**4.8**
Career		7	0	9.7	.367	–	.636	2.6	1.4	.3	.4	4.1

== Awards and honors ==
- Given the key to the city of Jacksonville by Mayor Tommy Hazouri in 1988
- In June 1993, he was one of 50 people in the US to receive the FBI Directors Award for community service.
- Official Torch Bearer of the Olympic Flame for the 1996 Summer Olympics in Atlanta (one of 13,267)
- Received the 1996 WTLV-TV 12 Who Care Council's Choice Award
- Received Humanitarian of the Year award from Jacksonville University on February 22, 2002
