= Charles C. Carson =

American mortician (1925–2002)

Charles C. Carson, Sr. (August 19, 1925 – August 8, 2002) was a civilian mortician for the United States Air Force and the namesake of the Charles C. Carson Center for Mortuary Affairs. The street on which the mortuary resides is also named in his honor.

== Personal ==
Carson was the son of Charles Carter and Alice Snow Carson in Montgomery, Alabama. He attended Alabama State High School and graduated from Tennessee State University to enable him to achieve a lifelong ambition to steady the uneasiness of and provide comfort to individuals and families experiencing the pain and agony accompanying the loss of a loved one. Carson married the former Virginia Lewis, his hometown sweetheart, in 1950. They became parents of two sons and three daughters.

== Work ==
Carson earned a license in mortuary science from Atlanta College of Mortuary Science in 1950 and began his career that same year as a manager with Smith and Gaston Funeral Home of Montgomery, Alabama. He served in a similar capacity with Gaston offices in Tuskegee and Mobile, Alabama.

A distinguished federal career as a civilian mortician began with the Department of the Air Force in 1958. He was the deputy mortuary officer at Tan Son Nhut Air Base, Republic of Vietnam and Clark Air Force Base in the Philippines from 1964 to 1970.

During the early part of the Vietnam War, he covered mortuary affairs in Thailand, Taiwan, and Hong Kong. He also administered mortuary contracts in New Guinea, New Zealand and Australia. Examples of his involvement in disasters in Southeast Asia are the naval disasters aboard the USS Oriskany in 1966, the USS Forrestal in 1967 and the Vietnam Tet Offensive. Carson had supervised mortuary preparation of remains in every major disaster involving American military and civilian personnel since 1971.

He was assigned to Dover Air Force Base August 1970 as a mortuary inspector and was promoted to Chief Port Mortuary Officer a year later. Carson applied his skills in a number of disasters, including the Tet Offensive in Vietnam and the Jonestown cult mass suicide in Guyana, Tenerife-Canary Islands at the request of the State Department; he served as technical advisor to the Wing and Group Commanders for mortuary affairs. He also supervised the processing of the remains of victims in the NASA Challenger mission and Desert Storm as well as the air plane disaster that claimed the life of then Secretary of Commerce Ron Brown.

He retired in 1996 and died August 8, 2002.
