= Michael Jennings (American football) =

American gridiron football player (born 1979)

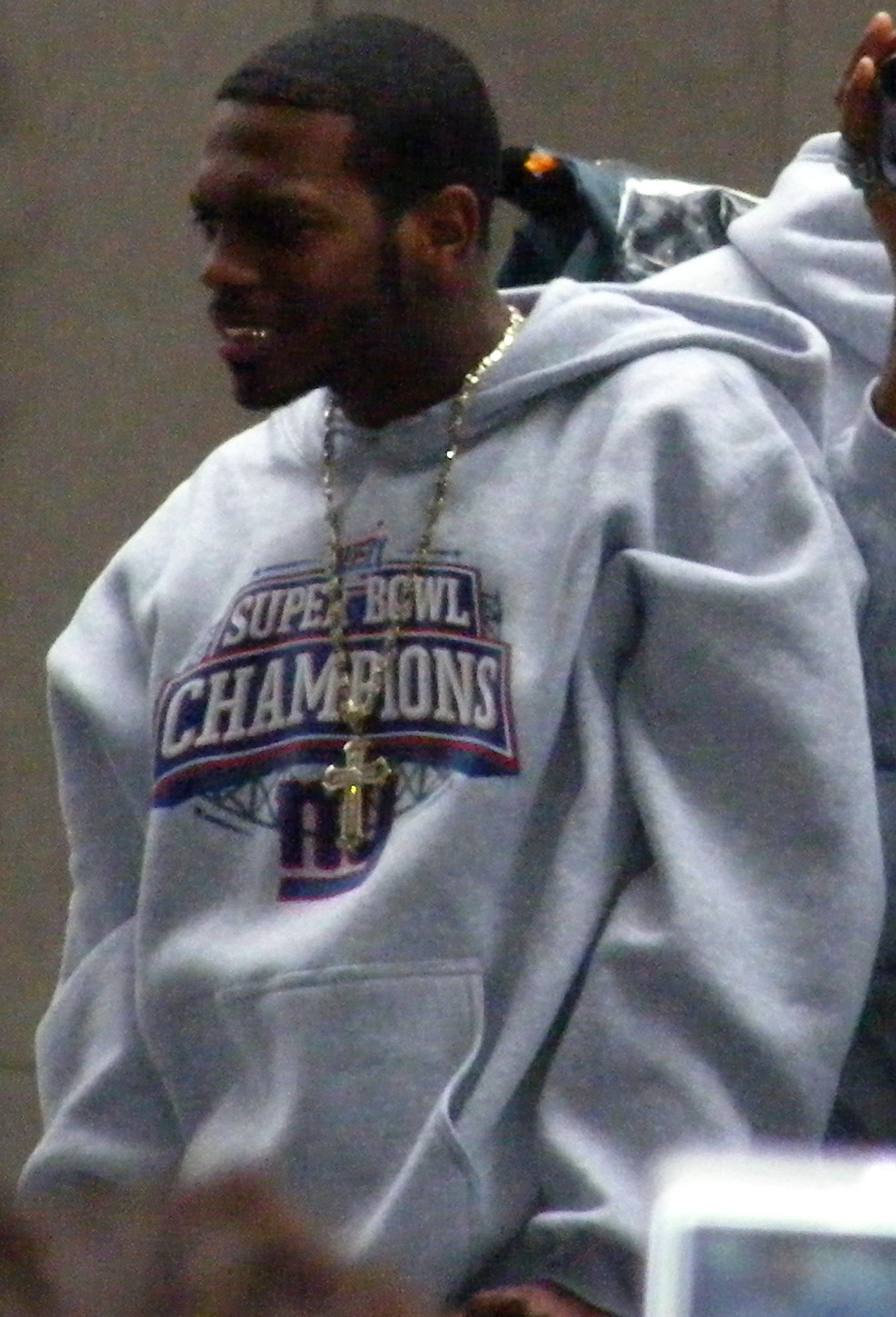
- Jennings during the New York Giants Super Bowl parade in 2008

No. 15
- Position: Wide receiver

Personal information
- Born: September 7, 1979 (age 47); Jacksonville, Florida, U.S.
- Listed height: 5 ft 11 in (1.80 m)
- Listed weight: 181 lb (82 kg)

Career information
- College: Florida State (track)
- NFL draft: 2002: undrafted

Career history
- San Francisco 49ers (2002)*; Scottish Claymores (2003)*; New England Patriots (2004)*; Baltimore Ravens (2004)*; Berlin Thunder (2005); New York Giants (2004–2007); Calgary Stampeders (2008)
- * Offseason or practice squad member only

Awards and highlights
- Super Bowl champion (XLII)

Career NFL statistics
- Receptions: 5
- Receiving yards: 49
- Stats at Pro Football Reference

Michael Jennings (born September 7, 1979) is an American former professional football player who was a wide receiver in the National Football League (NFL).

== Early life ==
Jennings attended Nathan Bedford Forest High School in Jacksonville, Florida, and was a student, and earned three letters in football and one in track as a senior sprinter.

== College career ==
Jennings never played football in college. He was a track and field athlete at Florida State, earning 3 letters as a Seminole and winning the ACC Championship as a member of the 4 × 400 relay team.

== Professional career ==
Michael Jennings entered the National Football League by signing with the San Francisco 49ers in 2002, but was cut before the season. Jennings was then selected in the 4th round of the 2003 NFL Europe Free Agent Draft by the Scottish Claymores. In 2004, he signed with the New England Patriots and the Baltimore Ravens before being cut by both. He finally made the New York Giants roster in 2005, after which he allocated to NFL Europa and played for the Berlin Thunder. He played in his first NFL game in the 2006 season. He was a starter in the 2nd preseason game of 2007 against the Baltimore Ravens. In the game, he made a diving catch and in doing so he ruptured his achilles tendon leaving him out for the season.

The Giants put Jennings on injured reserve due to his career-threatening injury.

The following year, he once again tried out for the Giants but was released after the final cuts.
