= List of presidential trips made by Donald Trump (2026) =

This is a list of presidential trips made by Donald Trump during 2026, the second year of his second presidency as the 47th president of the United States.

This list excludes trips made within Washington, D.C., the U.S. federal capital in which the White House, the official residence and principal workplace of the president, is located. Also excluded are stops at Joint Base Andrews, the airbase used when the president is departing Washington and Camp David, the official country residence of the president. International trips are included. Here are the number of visits per state, territory, or foreign country he traveled to:

- Domestic:
  - One: Alabama, Connecticut, Illinois, Mississippi, Montana, Nebraska, North Dakota, Oklahoma, South Dakota, and Wisconsin
  - Two: Arizona, California, Kansas, Kentucky, Maryland, and Pennsylvania
  - Three: Delaware, Iowa, Michigan, Nevada, North Carolina, South Carolina, and Tennessee
  - Four: Alaska, and Georgia
  - Five: Ohio
  - Six: New Jersey, New York, and Texas
  - Twenty: Florida
  - Thirty: Virginia
- International:
  - One: France, Philippines, Ireland, Switzerland and Turkey
  - Two: China

Locations in the contiguous United States that President Donald Trump has visited in 2026.

January (blue) – February (yellow) – March (brown) – April (pink) – May (grey) – June (orange) – July (purple) – August (light blue) – September (magenta) – October (green) – November (red) –

December (light green)
Locations in Alaska that President Donald Trump has visited.

== January ==
Country/ U.S. state	Areas visited	Dates	Details	Image
Florida	Mar-a-Lago, West Palm Beach, Lake Worth Beach	January 1–4	President Trump and First Lady Melania Trump continued their vacation in Florida. On Thursday, he played golf at Trump International Golf Club. On Friday, he went shopping at Arc Stone & Tile for the White House Ballroom and later played golf at Trump International Golf Club. On Sunday, January 4, he played golf at Trump International Golf Club before returning to Washington later in the same day.	
Florida	Mar-a-Lago, Palm Beach Gardens, West Palm Beach	January 9–11	Arriving via Palm Beach International Airport, President Trump visited Mar-a-Lago for the weekend. On Saturday, he went to a scheduled dental appointment at his local dentist. On Sunday, he played golf at Trump International Golf Club.	
Michigan	Detroit, Dearborn	January 13	Arriving via Detroit Metropolitan Airport, President Trump toured the Ford River Rouge complex before delivering remarks to the Detroit Economic Club at MotorCity Casino's Sound Board Theater.	
Florida	Mar-a-Lago, West Palm Beach, Miami Gardens	January 16–19	Arriving via Palm Beach International Airport, President Trump visited Mar-a-Lago for the weekend. On Friday, he attended the Southern Boulevard Dedication Ceremony. On Saturday, he played golf at Trump International Golf Club. On Sunday, he played golf before visiting Baer's Furniture. On Monday, he attended the 2026 College Football Playoff National Championship at Hard Rock Stadium.	
Switzerland	Davos	January 21–22	Arriving via Zurich Airport, President Trump attended the annual meeting of the World Economic Forum. He announced the Board of Peace's charter and held bilateral meetings with Swiss President Guy Parmelin, Polish President Karol Nawrocki, Belgian Prime Minister Bart De Wever, Egyptian President Abdel Fattah el-Sisi, Secretary General of NATO Mark Rutte, Azeri President Ilham Aliyev and Ukrainian President Volodymyr Zelenskyy.	
Iowa	Urbandale, Clive	January 27	Arriving via Des Moines International Airport, President Trump visited Machine Shed restaurant before delivering remarks at the Horizon Events Center.	
Florida	Mar-a-Lago	January 31	Arriving via Palm Beach International Airport, President Trump visited Mar-a-Lago for the weekend.	

== February ==
Country/ U.S. state	Areas visited	Dates	Details	Image
Florida	Mar-a-Lago	February 1	President Trump continued his weekend at Mar-a-Lago. He attended the wedding of Dan Scavino and Erin Elmore.	
Florida	Mar-a-Lago, West Palm Beach	February 6–8	Arriving via Palm Beach International Airport, President Trump visited Mar-a-Lago for the weekend. On Saturday and Sunday, he played golf at Trump International Golf Club.	
North Carolina	Fort Bragg	February 13	President Trump and First Lady Melania Trump visited Fort Bragg to honor special forces involved in Operation Absolute Resolve.	
Florida	Mar-a-Lago, West Palm Beach	February 13–16	Arriving via Palm Beach International Airport, President Trump and First Lady Melania Trump visited Mar-a-Lago for Valentine's Day and Presidents' Day weekend. On Saturday and Sunday, he played golf at Trump International Golf Club.	
Georgia	Rome	February 19	Arriving via Richard B. Russell Airport, President Trump visited The Varsity before delivering remarks on affordability and the economy at Coosa Steel Corporation.	
Texas	Corpus Christi	February 27	Arriving via Corpus Christi International Airport, President Trump delivered remarks on energy and the economy at the Port of Corpus Christi before visiting a Whataburger restaurant.	
Florida	Mar-a-Lago	February 27–28	Arriving via Palm Beach International Airport, President Trump visited Mar-a-Lago for the weekend. On Saturday, he participated in a MAGA Inc. dinner.	

== March ==
Country/ U.S. state	Areas visited	Dates	Details	Image
Florida	Mar-a-Lago	March 1	President Trump continued his weekend at Mar-a-Lago.	
Florida	Doral	March 6–7	Arriving via Miami International Airport, President Trump visited Trump National Doral Miami for the weekend. On Saturday, he met with Latin American leaders for the inaugural "Shield of the Americas" summit.	
Delaware	Dover	March 7	President Trump and attended the dignified transfer at Dover Air Force Base of the bodies of the six US soldiers killed in the 2026 Iran war.	
Florida	Doral	March 7–9	President Trump continued his weekend at Trump National Doral Miami. On Sunday, he played golf. On Monday, he visited the El Arepazo restaurant.	
Ohio	Reading	March 11	Arriving via Cincinnati/Northern Kentucky International Airport, President Trump visited Thermo Fisher Scientific to discuss TrumpRx.	
Kentucky	Hebron	March 11	President Trump delivered remarks at the Verst Logistics Contract Packaging Facility.	
Florida	Mar-a-Lago, West Palm Beach	March 13–15	Arriving via Palm Beach International Airport, President Trump visited Mar-a-Lago for the weekend. On Saturday, he played golf at Trump International Golf Club before participating in a MAGA Inc. dinner. On Sunday, he played golf again before returning to Washington.	
Delaware	Dover	March 18	President Trump attended a dignified transfer ceremony at Dover Air Force Base honoring fallen soldiers serving in the 2026 Iran war.	
Florida	Mar-a-Lago, West Palm Beach	March 20–23	Arriving via Palm Beach International Airport, President Trump visited Mar-a-Lago for the weekend. On Saturday and Sunday, he played golf at Trump International Golf Club.	
Tennessee	Memphis	March 23	Arriving via Memphis Air National Guard Base, President Trump visited Memphis to highlight the achievements of the Memphis Safe Task Force. He also visited Graceland.	
Florida	Miami Beach	March 27	Arriving via Miami International Airport, President Trump attended the Future Investment Initiative conference at the Faena Forum.	
Florida	Mar-a-Lago, West Palm Beach	March 27–29	Arriving via Palm Beach International Airport, President Trump visited Mar-a-Lago for the weekend. On Saturday, he played golf at Trump International Golf Club before participating in a MAGA Inc. meeting and dinner. On Sunday, he played golf again at Trump International Golf Club.	

== April ==
Country/ U.S. state	Areas visited	Dates	Details	Image
Virginia	Sterling	April 5	President Trump visited Trump National Golf Club.	
Virginia	Charlottesville	April 10	Arriving via Charlottesville–Albemarle Airport, President Trump attended a MAGA Inc. meeting and dinner at Trump Winery.	
Virginia	Sterling	April 11	President Trump visited Trump National Golf Club.	
Florida	Miami, Doral	April 11–12	Arriving via Miami International Airport, President Trump attended UFC 327 at the Kaseya Center. He then spent the weekend at Trump National Doral Miami. On Sunday, he played golf.	
Nevada	Las Vegas	April 16–17	Arriving via Harry Reid International Airport, President Trump held a roundtable to tout tax cuts from the One Big Beautiful Bill Act at the AC Hotel Las Vegas Symphony Park. He spent the night at Trump International Hotel Las Vegas.	
Arizona	Phoenix	April 17	Arriving via Phoenix Sky Harbor International Airport, President Trump attended a Turning Point USA event at Dream City Church featuring Erika Kirk and Andy Biggs.	
Virginia	Sterling	April 18	President Trump visited Trump National Golf Club.	
Florida	Mar-a-Lago	April 24–25	Arriving via Palm Beach International Airport, President Trump visited Mar-a-Lago for the weekend. On Friday, he participated in the RNC Spring Retreat. On Saturday, he attended a conference with the top holders of the $Trump meme coin.	

== May ==
Country/ U.S. state	Areas visited	Dates	Details	Image
Florida	The Villages, Mar-a-Lago, West Palm Beach, Jupiter, Doral	May 1–3	Arriving via Ocala International Airport, President Trump delivered remarks to seniors at The Villages Charter High School. Arriving via Palm Beach International Airport, President Trump visited Mar-a-Lago for the weekend. On Friday, he delivered remarks at the Forum Club of the Palm Beaches dinner at the Kravis Center for the Performing Arts. On Saturday, he visited Trump National Golf Club Jupiter before going to a scheduled dental appointment at his local dentist. Arriving via Miami International Airport, President Trump visited Trump National Doral Miami. On Sunday, he attended the PGA Tour Cadillac Championship.	
Virginia	Sterling	May 8	President Trump participated in a LIV Golf Dinner at Trump National Golf Club.	
Virginia	Sterling	May 9	President Trump attended the LIV Golf Tournament at Trump National Golf Club.	
Alaska	Anchorage	May 12	President Trump briefly stopped at Ted Stevens Anchorage International Airport to refuel on his way to China. He also picked up Nvidia CEO Jensen Huang.	
China	Beijing	May 13–15	Arriving via Beijing Capital International Airport, President Trump held a summit with Chinese leader Xi Jinping. Initially planned for the first week of April, the meeting was postponed to May due to the 2026 Iran war.	
Alaska	Anchorage	May 15	President Trump briefly stopped at Ted Stevens Anchorage International Airport to refuel on his way back from China.	
Virginia	Sterling	May 16	President Trump visited Trump National Golf Club.	
Virginia	Sterling	May 17	President Trump visited Trump National Golf Club.	
Connecticut	New London	May 20	Arriving via Groton–New London Airport, President Trump delivered the keynote address at the Coast Guard Academy graduation commencement on Cadet Memorial Field.	
New York	Suffern	May 22	Arriving via Morristown Municipal Airport and flying to Rockland Community College on Marine One, President Trump held an event with Mike Lawler at the Eugene Levy Fieldhouse.	
Virginia	Arlington	May 25	President Trump attended the Armed Forces Full Honor Wreath Ceremony at Arlington National Cemetery, followed by the National Memorial Day Observance in the Memorial Amphitheater.	
Maryland	Bethesda	May 26	President Trump visited Walter Reed National Military Medical Center for his annual medical checkup.	
Virginia	Sterling	May 30	President Trump visited Trump National Golf Club.	
Virginia	Sterling	May 31	President Trump visited Trump National Golf Club.	

== June ==
Country/ U.S. state	Areas visited	Dates	Details	Image
Wisconsin	Chippewa Falls	June 5	Arriving via Chippewa Valley Regional Airport, President Trump held a roundtable at Custer Farms to highlight his administration's agriculture agenda.	
New Jersey	Bedminster	June 5–8	Arriving via Morristown Municipal Airport and flying to Bedminster on Marine One, President Trump visited Trump National Golf Club for the weekend.	
New York	New York City	June 8	Arriving via the Downtown Manhattan Heliport on Marine One, President Trump attended Game 3 of the NBA Finals at Madison Square Garden. President Trump then returned to Washington via John F. Kennedy Airport.	
Virginia	Sterling	June 13	President Trump played golf before participating in a MAGA Inc. dinner at Trump National Golf Club.	
France	Évian-les-Bains, Versailles	June 15–17	Main article: 52nd G7 summit Arriving via Geneva Airport, President Trump attended the 52nd G7 summit. He held bilateral meetings with French President Emmanuel Macron, Qatari Emir Tamim bin Hamad Al Thani, Emirati President Mohamed bin Zayed Al Nahyan, Egyptian President Abdel Fattah el-Sisi, and Indian Prime Minister Narendra Modi. On July 18, arriving via Paris Orly Airport, President Trump attended a dinner with French President Emmanuel Macron at the Palace of Versailles. President Trump signed the Islamabad Memorandum.	
Pennsylvania	Macungie	June 23	Arriving via Reading Regional Airport, President Trump toured and delivered remarks at Mack Trucks Lehigh Valley Operations.	
Virginia	Sterling	June 27	President Trump participated in a MAGA Inc. Lunch at Trump National Golf Club.	
Virginia	Sterling	June 28	President Trump visited Trump National Golf Club.	

== July ==
Country/ U.S. state	Areas visited	Dates	Details	Image
North Dakota	Medora	July 1	Arriving via Bismarck Municipal Airport on the first flight aboard the new Air Force One, President Trump participated in a Freedom 250 train ride and toured the Theodore Roosevelt Presidential Library, before delivering remarks at the Burning Hills Amphitheater.	
South Dakota	Pennington County	July 3	Arriving via Ellsworth Air Force Base, President Trump visited Mount Rushmore to celebrate the 250th Anniversary of American Independence.	
Virginia	Sterling	July 5	President Trump visited Trump National Golf Club.	
Turkey	Ankara	July 7–8	Main article: 2026 Ankara NATO summit Arriving via Etimesgut Air Base, President Trump attended the 2026 Ankara NATO summit at the Presidential Complex of Turkey. He stayed at the JW Marriott Ankara. He held bilateral meetings with Turkish President Recep Erdoğan, NATO Secretary General Mark Rutte, Ukrainian President Volodymyr Zelenskyy, and Syrian President Ahmed al-Sharaa. On the return trip, President Trump secretly flew a Boeing C-32 military plane to RAF Mildenhall (while the press and several White House aides remained on an old Air Force One), where he switched to the newer plane for the remainder of the trip back to Washington.	
Virginia	Sterling	July 11	President Trump visited Trump National Golf Club.	
Virginia	Sterling	July 12	President Trump visited Trump National Golf Club.	
Pennsylvania	Carlisle	July 15	Arriving on Marine One, President Trump attended the Pennsylvania Defense and Innovation Summit at the United States Army War College.	
New York	New York City	July 17	Arriving via John F. Kennedy International Airport and flying to the Downtown Manhattan Heliport on Marine One, President Trump attended a FIFA Reception at Trump Tower.	
New Jersey	Bedminster, East Rutherford	July 17–19	Arriving in Bedminster from the Downtown Manhattan Heliport on Marine One, President Trump visited Trump National Golf Club for the weekend. On Saturday, he played golf. On Sunday, arriving on Marine One, he attended the 2026 FIFA World Cup final at MetLife Stadium before returning to Washington via Newark Liberty International Airport.	
Delaware	Dover	July 22	President Trump attended a dignified transfer ceremony at Dover Air Force Base honoring fallen soldiers serving in the 2026 Iran war.	
Georgia	Marietta	July 22	Arriving via Dobbins Air Reserve Base, President Trump visited Wheeler High School to deliver remarks on Trump Accounts.	
Virginia	Sterling	July 25	President Trump visited Trump National Golf Club.	
Virginia	Sterling	July 26	President Trump visited Trump National Golf Club.	
Michigan	Milford	July 27	Arriving via Oakland County International Airport, President Trump toured and delivered remarks at General Motors Proving Ground.	
New Jersey	Bedminster	July 31	Arriving via Morristown Municipal Airport and flying to Bedminster on Marine One, President Trump visited Trump National Golf Club for the weekend.	

== August ==
Country/ U.S. state	Areas visited	Dates	Details	Image
New Jersey	Bedminster	August 1–2	President Trump continued his weekend at Trump National Golf Club.	
California	Rancho Palos Verdes	August 4	Arriving via Los Angeles International Airport and flying to Rancho Palos Verdes on Marine One, President Trump headlined a Republican National Committee dinner at Trump National Golf Club Los Angeles.	
Nevada	Las Vegas	August 4–5	Arriving via Harry Reid International Airport, President Trump spent the night at Trump International Hotel Las Vegas. On Wednesday, he delivered remarks at Red Rock Casino Resort and Spa.	
New Jersey	Bedminster	August 7–9	Arriving via Newark Liberty International Airport, President Trump visited Trump National Golf Club for the weekend. On Saturday, he attended the LIV Golf Bedminster tournament. He returned to Washington via Morristown Municipal Airport.	
Ohio	Geneva	August 11	Arriving via Cleveland Hopkins International Airport and flying to Geneva on Marine One, President Trump attended the finale of the Patriot Games at SPIRE Academy.	
New York	Garden City	August 14	Arriving via John F. Kennedy International Airport and flying to Mitchel County Park on Marine One, President Trump toured and delivered remarks at the David S. Mack Center for Training and Intelligence.	
New Jersey	Bedminster	August 14–16	Arriving on Marine One, President Trump visited Trump National Golf Club for the weekend. He returned to Washington via Morristown Municipal Airport.	
South Carolina	Myrtle Beach	August 21	Arriving via Myrtle Beach International Airport, President Trump campaigned for Senator Darline Graham at the Myrtle Beach Convention Center ahead of the special Republican primary runoff.	
Virginia	Sterling	August 22	President Trump visited Trump National Golf Club. He participated in a MAGA Inc. meeting.	
Texas	Houston	August 27–28	Arriving via Ellington Field Joint Reserve Base, President Trump headlined a Republican National Committee fundraiser at the Post Oak Hotel, where he stayed overnight. On Friday, he awarded the crew of Artemis II the Congressional Space Medal of Honor at Johnson Space Center.	
Virginia	Sterling	August 29	President Trump visited Trump National Golf Club. He participated in a MAGA Inc. meeting and dinner.	
Virginia	Sterling	August 30	President Trump visited Trump National Golf Club.	

== September ==
Country/ U.S. state	Areas visited	Dates	Details	Image
New Jersey	Bedminster	September 4–7	Arriving via Morristown Municipal Airport and flying to Bedminster on Marine One, President Trump spent Labor Day weekend at Trump National Golf Club.	
Texas	Dallas, Arlington	September 9–10	Arriving via Dallas Fort Worth International Airport, President Trump participated in a MAGA Inc. meeting before attending both days of the 2026 Republican National Convention at the American Airlines Center. He spent the night at the Rosewood Mansion on Turtle Creek. On Thursday, he visited the National Medal of Honor Museum and participated in an RNC roundtable before delivering closing remarks at the convention.	
Virginia	Arlington	September 11	President Trump attended a ceremony at the Pentagon commemorating the 25th anniversary of the September 11 attacks.	
Ireland	Dublin, County Clare	September 12–13	Arriving via Dublin Airport, President Trump participated in a courtesy call with President Catherine Connolly at Áras an Uachtaráin, held a bilateral meeting with Taoiseach Micheál Martin at Farmleigh and delivered remarks to business leaders and embassy workers at Deerfield Residence. Arriving via Shannon Airport, President Trump visited and spent the night at Trump International Golf Links & Hotel Ireland for the 2026 Irish Open. On Sunday, President Trump presented the trophy to the winner at the conclusion of the final round of the competition.	
North Carolina	Gastonia	September 16	Arriving via Charlotte Douglas International Airport, President Trump held a midterm rally with Michael Whatley at Gastonia Municipal Airport.	
Virginia	Sterling	September 18	Arriving on Marine One, President Trump visited Trump National Golf Club. He participated in a MAGA Inc. meeting and dinner.	
Virginia	Sterling	September 20	President Trump visited Trump National Golf Club.	
New York	New York City	September 21–22	Arriving via John F. Kennedy International Airport and flying to the Downtown Manhattan Heliport on Marine One, President Trump met New York Mayor Zohran Mamdani at Gracie Mansion. Later, at Trump Tower, he met with French President Emmanuel Macron, attended an RNC reception and a MAGA Inc. dinner, and spent the night. On Tuesday, he delivered remarks at the United Nations General Assembly and met Danish Prime Minister Mette Frederiksen and Greenland's Prime Minister Jens-Frederik Nielsen for a trilateral signing ceremony. After, he met British Prime Minister Andy Burnham, Japanese Prime Minister Sanae Takaichi, and Ukrainian President Volodymyr Zelenskyy. He also participated in a Shield of the Americas event and held a multialetral meeting with Middle Eastern leaders regarding Gaza. Later, he attended the UNGA Leaders' Reception at the Lotte New York Palace Hotel, where he met Venezuela's Acting President Delcy Rodríguez and South Korea's President Lee Jae Myung.	
Tennessee	Knoxville	September 26	Arriving via McGhee Tyson Airport, President Trump attended the Texas Longhorns vs. Tennessee Volunteers college football game at Neyland Stadium.	
Illinois	Medinah	September 27	Arriving via O'Hare International Airport, President Trump attended the 2026 Presidents Cup at the Medinah Country Club as Honorary Chairman.	

== October ==
Country/ U.S. state	Areas visited	Dates	Details	Image
Texas	Denton	October 1	Arriving via Dallas Fort Worth International Airport, President Trump delivered remarks at Peterbilt Motors Company.	
Oklahoma	Durant	October 1	President Trump held a midterm rally at the Choctaw Event Center with gubernatorial nominee Mike Mazzei. He then returned to Washington via Dallas Fort Worth International Airport.	
Alabama	Mobile	October 2	Arriving via Mobile International Airport, President Trump held a midterm rally at the Mitchell Center at the University of South Alabama.	
Virginia	Sterling	October 3	President Trump visited Trump National Golf Club.	
Ohio	Vandalia	October 3	Arriving via Dayton International Airport, President Trump held a midterm rally at Butler High School with Senator Jon Husted and gubernatorial nominee Vivek Ramaswamy.	
Virginia	Sterling	October 4	President Trump visited Trump National Golf Club.	
Nebraska	Grand Island	October 5	Arriving via Central Nebraska Regional Airport, President Trump held a midterm rally at Pinnacle Bank Expo Center for Senator Pete Ricketts.	
Maryland	Dundalk	October 6	Arriving on Marine One, President Trump visited and delivered remarks at an event at Tradepoint Atlantic with Anduril Industries.	
Texas	San Antonio	October 7	Arriving via Kelly Field, President Trump held a midterm rally at the Freeman Coliseum with Ken Paxton.	
New York	Syracuse	October 9	Arriving via Syracuse Hancock International Airport, President Trump held a midterm rally at the Oncenter with Bruce Blakeman.	
Tennessee	Clarksville	October 10	Arriving via Campbell Army Airfield, President Trump held a midterm rally at F&M Bank Arena.	
Virginia	Sterling	October 12	President Trump visited Trump National Golf Club.	
Ohio	Youngstown	October 12	Arriving via Youngstown Air Reserve Station, President Trump held a midterm rally at the Covelli Centre.	
Alaska	Wasilla	October 13	Arriving via Joint Base Elmendorf–Richardson and flying to Wasilla Airport on Marine One, President Trump held a midterm rally for Senator Dan Sullivan at the Curtis D. Menard Memorial Sports Center.	
Nevada	Las Vegas	October 13–14	Arriving via Harry Reid International Airport, President Trump spent the night at Trump International Hotel Las Vegas.	
Arizona	Bullhead City	October 14	Arriving on Air Force One, President Trump held a midterm rally at the Laughlin/Bullhead International Airport.	
Montana	Kalispell	October 14	Arriving via Glacier Park International Airport, President Trump held a midterm rally at the Majestic Valley Arena. He then returned to Washington via Missoula Montana Airport.	
Georgia	Dalton	October 16	Arriving via Dobbins Air Reserve Base and flying to the regional airport on Marine One, President Trump held a midterm rally for Mike Collins at Dalton Municipal Airport.	
Florida	Mar-a-Lago	October 16–17	Arriving via President Donald J. Trump International Airport, President Trump visited Mar-a-Lago. He attended an RNC dinner and spent the night at Mar-a-Lago.	
Kentucky	Highland Heights	October 17	Arriving via Cincinnati/Northern Kentucky International Airport, President Trump held a midterm rally at the Truist Arena.	
Florida	Mar-a-Lago, West Palm Beach	October 17–18	Arriving via President Donald J. Trump International Airport, President Trump continued the weekend at Mar-a-Lago. He attended a MAGA Inc. Meeting and Candlelight Dinner. On Sunday, he played golf at Trump International Golf Club.	
Kansas	Park City	October 19	Arriving via McConnell Air Force Base, President Trump held a midterm rally for Senator Roger Marshall at the Heartland Credit Union Arena.	
North Carolina	Greenville	October 20	Arriving on Air Force One, President Trump held a midterm rally for GOP Senate nominee Michael Whatley and congressional candidate Laurie Buckhout at Pitt-Greenville Airport.	
South Carolina	Pendleton	October 21	Arriving via Greenville–Spartanburg International Airport, President Trump held a midterm rally for Senator Darline Graham at the T. Ed Garrison Arena.	
Iowa	Sioux City	October 22	Arriving on Air Force One, President Trump held a midterm rally at Sioux Gateway Airport.	
Florida	Fort Myers	October 23	Arriving via Southwest Florida International Airport, President Trump held a midterm rally at Alico Arena.	
Florida	Palm Beach, West Palm Beach	October 23–24	Arriving via President Donald J. Trump International Airport, President Trump spent the night at Mar-a-Lago. On Saturday, he played golf at Trump International Golf Club before voting in the 2026 United States elections at the Palm Beach County Supervisor of Elections office.	
Georgia	Perry	October 24	Arriving via Robins Air Force Base, President Trump held a midterm rally at the Guardian Centers.	
Michigan	Port Huron	October 25	Arriving via Selfridge Air National Guard Base, President Trump held a midterm rally at McMorran Place Arena.	
Mississippi	Corinth	October 26	Arriving via Memphis International Airport and flying to Roscoe Turner Airport on Marine One, President Trump held a midterm rally at Crossroads Arena.	
Texas	Corpus Christi	October 27	Arriving via Corpus Christi International Airport, President Trump held a midterm rally at the Port of Corpus Christi.	
Texas	Lubbock	October 27	Arriving via Lubbock Preston Smith International Airport, President Trump held a midterm rally at the Lubbock Memorial Civic Center.	
Ohio	Chillicothe	October 28	Arriving via Rickenbacker International Airport and flying to Yoctangee Park Landing Zone on Marine One, President Trump held a midterm rally at the Shoemaker Center.	
South Carolina	Rock Hill	October 29	Arriving via Charlotte Douglas International Airport, President Trump held a midterm rally at the Rock Hill Sports & Event Center.	
Florida	Daytona Beach	October 30	Arriving via Daytona Beach International Airport, President Trump held a midterm rally at the Ocean Center.	
Florida	Palm Beach, West Palm Beach	October 30–31	Arriving via President Donald J. Trump International Airport, President Trump visited Mar-a-Lago for the weekend. On Saturday, he played golf at Trump International Golf Club.	

== November ==
Country/ U.S. state	Areas visited	Dates	Details	Image
Florida	Palm Beach	November 1	President Trump continued the weekend at Mar-a-Lago.	
Iowa	Dubuque	November 1	Arriving via Dubuque Regional Airport, President Trump held a midterm rally at the Five Flags Center.	
Kansas	Salina	November 1	Arriving on Air Force One, President Trump held a midterm rally at Salina Regional Airport.	
Florida	Cape Canaveral	November 6	Arriving via Shuttle Landing Facility, President Trump delivered remarks at the UP Summit at the Kennedy Space Center.	
Florida	Palm Beach, West Palm Beach	November 6–8	Arriving via President Donald J. Trump International Airport, President Trump visited Mar-a-Lago for the weekend. On Saturday and Sunday, he played golf at Trump International Golf Club.	
Virginia	Arlington, Sterling	November 11	President Trump participated in a wreath-laying ceremony at the Tomb of the Unknown Soldier in Arlington National Cemetery on Veterans Day and delivered the Veterans Day address at the Memorial Amphitheater. He then played golf at Trump National Golf Club.	
Alaska	Fairbanks	November 16	President Trump briefly stopped at Fairbanks International Airport to refuel en route to the Philippines.	
Philippines	Manila, Parañaque	November 17–18	Arriving via Ninoy Aquino International Airport, President Trump attended a QUAD Summit, a signing event with Prime Minister Anutin Charnvirakul on U.S.-Thai trade and a U.S.-ASEAN leaders Summit, on the sideline of the 49th ASEAN Summit at Solaire Resort. On Wednesday, he held a bilateral meeting with President Marcos at Malacañang Palace as part of a state visit.	
China	Shenzhen	November 18–19	Arriving via Shenzhen Bao’an International Airport, President Trump attended the APEC Economic Leaders' Meeting 2026 at the Shenzhen International Exchange Center. On Thursday, he held a working lunch with President Xi Jinping, a bilateral meeting with Russian President Vladimir Putin and a trilateral meeting with both of them at the Shenzhen Kylin Villa.	
Virginia	Sterling	November 21	President Trump played golf at Trump National Golf Club.	

== Future trips ==
The following trips are scheduled to be made by President Trump during the remainder of 2026:

Country/ U.S. state	Areas visited	Dates	Details
Virginia	Sterling	November 22	President Trump plans to attend a $Trump Coin Gala Dinner at Trump National Golf Club.
Florida	Palm Beach, West Palm Beach	November 24–29	Arriving via President Donald J. Trump International Airport, President Trump plans to spend Thanksgiving holidays at Mar-a-Lago.
California	Simi Valley	December 4	President Trump plans to deliver a keynote address at the Reagan National Defense Forum at the Ronald Reagan Presidential Library.
New Jersey	East Rutherford	December 12	President Trump plans to attend the Army–Navy Game at MetLife Stadium.
Florida	Miami	December 14–15	President Trump plans to attend and host the 2026 G20 Miami summit at Trump National Doral Miami.

== See also ==
- List of international presidential trips made by Donald Trump
- List of Donald Trump rallies (2025–present)
- Lists of presidential trips made by Donald Trump
