= Otis Smith Kids Foundation =

- Founder: Otis Smith
- Founded at: Jacksonville, Florida
- Dissolved: 2007
- Type: 501(c)(3) non-profit

The Otis F. Smith Foundation (and later, the Otis Smith Kids Foundation) was a 501(c)(3) non-profit organization that partnered with targeted Jacksonville, Florida elementary schools to provide programs and services to disadvantaged children in the areas of education, personal development and recreation. It was one of the first "celebrity" charitable foundations in the First Coast region that supported initiatives to help at-risk youth and was active for almost two decades. The organization dissolved in 2007.

== The beginning ==
Otis Smith was born and raised in Jacksonville, Florida and played sports at the local Boy's Club while growing up. Since his college days at Jacksonville University, he was involved with Volunteers for Youth, Big Brothers Big Sisters, Boys and Girls Clubs of America and conducted informal basketball clinics during summers. When Smith returned to Florida in 1989 to play professional basketball for the Orlando Magic, he founded the Otis F. Smith Foundation which began hosting summer basketball clinics for kids.

== Programs ==
The foundation's activities were expanded into neighborhoods and elementary schools considered economically and academically challenged. Their programs included free summer day camps, after-school tutoring and enrichment programs during the school year such as holiday parties and field trips to sporting events, cultural institutions & local attractions. Health screenings were one of the last services provided. Throughout the 1990s the organization expanded and programs flourished.

The charity, with an annual budget of about $400,000 and four full-time employees, never received government funds. In a review of local foundations connected to professional athletes, the Otis Smith Kids Foundation rated highly, with 78.6% for 2005.

== Fundraising ==
=== Awards show ===
Since its first appearance on live television in 1996 as the event that benefited the Otis F. Smith Foundation charity, the Florida Sports Awards had grown to the point of being recognized as a local version of the ESPYs. Over the years, the profitability of the Florida Sports Awards show was reduced as production costs increased. Andy Jacobs, president of First Coast Sports Awards, Inc. and driving force behind the event retired from the Florida Sports Awards in September 2002.

=== New name ===
In November 2002, the Otis F. Smith Foundation was renamed the Otis Smith Kids Foundation in an attempt to emphasize that kids were the focus.

Otis Smith at Sea Cow Auction

=== Sea Cows for Kids ===
Just like Cincinnati's Big Pig Gig and Chicago's Cows on Parade, these fiberglass manatees were part of a 2004-2005 fund-raising effort for the foundation. A total of 43 colorfully decorated, lifelike fiberglass manatees took up residence throughout the city, beginning in September 2004—in time for Super Bowl XXXIX—and remained until the end of February 2005. They were cleaned up and prepared for the Great Sea Cow Roundup and Auction, held April 2 at the Jacksonville Fairgrounds. After the Roundup & Auction concluded, the winning bidders loaded them up and moved their new artwork to back yards and business locations.

=== Big Cats for Kids ===
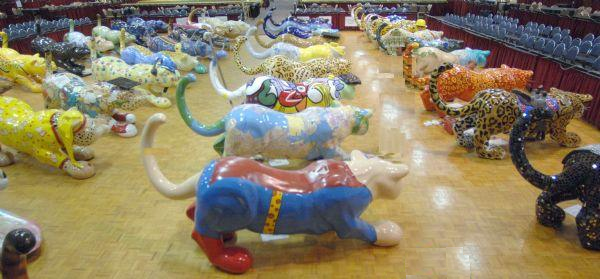
Big Cats prior to auction

Big Cats for Kids was kicked off in 2006. A total of 53 entities paid $5000 each to sponsor the Cat of their choice. The theme-decorated Big Cats were displayed in locations all over Jacksonville for almost a year before being sold.

More than 400 people attended Jammies & Jeans: The Cats Pajamas Party on July 10, 2007, where 41 of the 53 big cats were auctioned off to their FURever homes (the other 12 cats were adopted by their SPOTsors prior to the auction). Vincent Van Jaguar sold at the auction for $12,000, but the average price was $2,900. The project raised more than $220,000.

== The foundation's demise ==
After 18 years, and with the reliable financial support activities gone, the Otis Smith Kids Foundation closed its doors at the end of 2007. Smith announced its demise in a news release on August 29, 2007.

With successful programs and services being provided by folks like Mal Washington, Tony Boselli, Mike Peterson and others," Smith said in the release, "we're confident that the deserving children of Jacksonville are in great hands, and we are honored to have had the opportunity to make an impact on this community over the years.

Board members cited the current economic environment, in addition to increased competition for corporate and private donations, as dominant factors in the decision-making process.

== Scholarships ==
=== FCCJ ===
The scholarship program at Florida Community College at Jacksonville was the recipient of an endowment from the OSKF.

=== UNF ===
The OSKF donated $56,000 to the University of North Florida to establish an endowed scholarship fund in support of the Florida First Generation Scholarship Program for students who are the first in their families to attend college. The state of Florida will match the gift with $2,300 annually, funding two scholarships each year.

=== JU ===
The OSKF donated $50,000 to the Jacksonville University athletics department to establish and endow the Otis Smith Scholarship to a deserving local student-athlete. The donation was announced during halftime of a basketball game designated as "Otis Smith Night" on November 28, 2007. The honoree was unable to attend, but left a pre-recorded video. In a surprise to athletic officials, Smith stated that he was personally matching the $50,000 donation by the Otis Smith Kids Foundation, for a total gift of $100,000.
