= Westside High School (Jacksonville) =

Coordinates: 30.246475°N 81.765713°W

Location
- 5530 Firestone Road; Jacksonville, Florida 32244; United States

Information
- Type: Public school
- Motto: "Exceeding expectations"
- Established: 1959
- Principal: Vincent Foster
- Staff: 81.00 (FTE)
- Enrollment: 1,617 (2023-2024)
- Student to teacher ratio: 19.96
- Colors: Gray, black, and red
- Mascot: Wolverine

Westside High School is a public high school in Jacksonville, Florida, United States. It is part of the Duval County School District and serves Jacksonville's Westside. The school was established in 1959 and was originally named Nathan B. Forrest High School, after Nathan Bedford Forrest, a Confederate general and first Grand Wizard of the Ku Klux Klan. The fact that the school was named for Forrest was a point of significant controversy until the Duval County School Board changed the name in 2014.

== History ==
The school opened as New School 207 in 1959 in Jacksonville's Wesconnett neighborhood, at the site of present-day Westside Middle School (formerly J. E. B. Stuart Middle School). Built during the era of racial segregation, it was originally a white-only school. The school's name was a contentious issue from the beginning, with three groups supporting different names. Incoming students, who had already dubbed the football team the "Vikings", voted to name it Valhalla High School, while another faction wanted to name it Wesconnett High School after the neighborhood. The United Daughters of the Confederacy wanted the school named for "a distinguished Southern leader", eventually settling on Confederate general Nathan Bedford Forrest. After multiple votes failed to find agreement, the Duval County School Board voted to name the school Nathan B. Forrest High School on September 17, 1959. When the school's name officially became Nathan Bedford Forrest High School, Confederate symbolism and its athletics nickname, "Rebels," were adopted as well as featuring Confederate flags, "rebel yells" and the song "Dixie" at sporting events. The use of Confederate imagery became a recurring point of contention after the school was integrated.

In 1961 the school board branched off Forrest's junior high school, forming what is now Jefferson Davis Middle School. The measure allowed Forrest to avoid double sessions. In 1966 the board relocated Forrest to its present location on Firestone Road, converting the old building into J. E. B. Stuart Middle School.

== Naming issue ==
The fact that the school was named for Nathan Bedford Forrest became a point of contention and controversy. Later commenters have seen the decision as a response to the U.S. Supreme Court's decision in Brown v. Board of Education that school segregation was unconstitutional. Critics pointed to controversial aspects of Forrest's biography to argue he was an inappropriate namesake for the school. Most significantly they noted his background as a slave owner and trader; his possible role in the Fort Pillow Massacre, in which many black Union troops were killed; and especially the fact that he was an early leader in the Ku Klux Klan, being elected Grand Dragon in 1867.

In the 21st century, the school was majority African-American, and many critics felt the name was a holdover of institutional racism. The local controversy periodically drew national attention, and many local leaders felt it cast a poor light on the city of Jacksonville. In November 2006, the latest in a long line of petitions to change the name of the high school was submitted to the Duval County School Board. On November 3, 2008—the day before Barack Obama's election as the first black President of the United States—the Duval County School Board voted to retain the name; the vote was 5–2, with the only two black members of the board voting to drop Forrest's name from the school.

However, under pressure from then-Superintendent Nikolai Vitti, in 2013 the School Board revisited the issue. The movement to change the name was aided by a petition started by local resident Omotayo Richmond that garnered thousands of signatures. A School Board requirement for changing a school's name was a stakeholder's vote, which involved surveying students, parents, alumni, and teachers. The survey revealed that 64% of current students favored a name change, but 94% of the alumni favored retaining the name. On December 16, 2013, the day the survey results were presented, the School Board voted unanimously to change the name, leaving the new name up to a student vote. Because the Duval school board had years earlier voted to no longer name schools after people (due to such controversies) the students were given a choice of only two names, "Westside High School" and "Firestone High School", with the latter being the name of the street on which the school is located. After this vote, the School Board voted on January 7, 2014, to rename the school "Westside High School" as of July 1, 2014. On January 21, students voted to rename their sports teams from the "Rebels" to the "Wolverines".

== Feeder schools ==
- Westside Middle School
  - Cedar Hills
  - Sadie Tillis
  - Stonewall Jackson
  - Timucuan
- Charger Academy
  - Cedar Hills
  - Chimney Lakes
  - Enterprise
  - Gregory Drive
  - Jacksonville Heights
  - Normandy Village
  - Sadie Tillis
- Westview Middle School
  - Westview

== Academics ==
In 2009 the school earned a "D" grade. The school earned an "F" the two years before. But as of 2010 the school was thought to be "exceeding expectations" as their motto states. Under the leadership of Dr. Gregory D. Bostic, both the school's grade and graduation rate has risen. As of the school year 2014–2015, Wolverines' are able to boast a school grade of "C" and a graduation rate of 86%, nearly 10 percentage points higher than the state's average of 77% and four percentage points higher than the national average of 82%.

== Athletics ==
Westside fields sports teams in football, baseball, swimming, basketball, volleyball, soccer and wrestling, among others. The current mascot is the Wolverines. Prior to the name change, the school mascot was the Confederate Rebel, modeled in appearance after Colonel Reb, the former mascot of the University of Mississippi.

Their most famous athletic alumni is basketball guard/forward Otis Smith, who played at Jacksonville University after graduating from Forrest in 1982, then went on to play for the NBA Denver Nuggets for two seasons, Golden State Warriors for the 1987–88 season, then three seasons with the Orlando Magic. He retired as a player in 1992 and is now the current general manager of the Orlando Magic.

The school also has a large AFJROTC program, including three unarmed drill teams, a sabre guard, an armed drill team, and a color guard.

The school has an outdoor pool which is used by the athletic teams and physical education classes during the academic year; then it becomes a free public pool operated by the City of Jacksonville Parks & Recreation Department during the summer months.

== Notable alumni ==
- Don Barnes – member of the band 38 Special
- Allen Collins – Founding member and guitarist of the Southern rock band Lynyrd Skynyrd.
- Gene Deckerhoff – Radio play-by-play announcer of the NFL's Tampa Bay Buccaneers, and broadcaster of Florida State Seminoles athletics
- Dave Hlubek – Founding member and guitarist of the Southern rock band Molly Hatchet
- Michael Jennings – Track and field standout at Florida State University and American football wide receiver
- Otis Smith – Former Jacksonville University standout, retired American professional basketball player and former general manager of the NBA's Orlando Magic
- Scott Speicher – United States Navy pilot who was killed when his F/A-18 Hornet fighter was shot down over Iraq on January 17, 1991, the first night of Operation Desert Storm
