= Dignified transfer =

Transfer of US service members remains from overseas

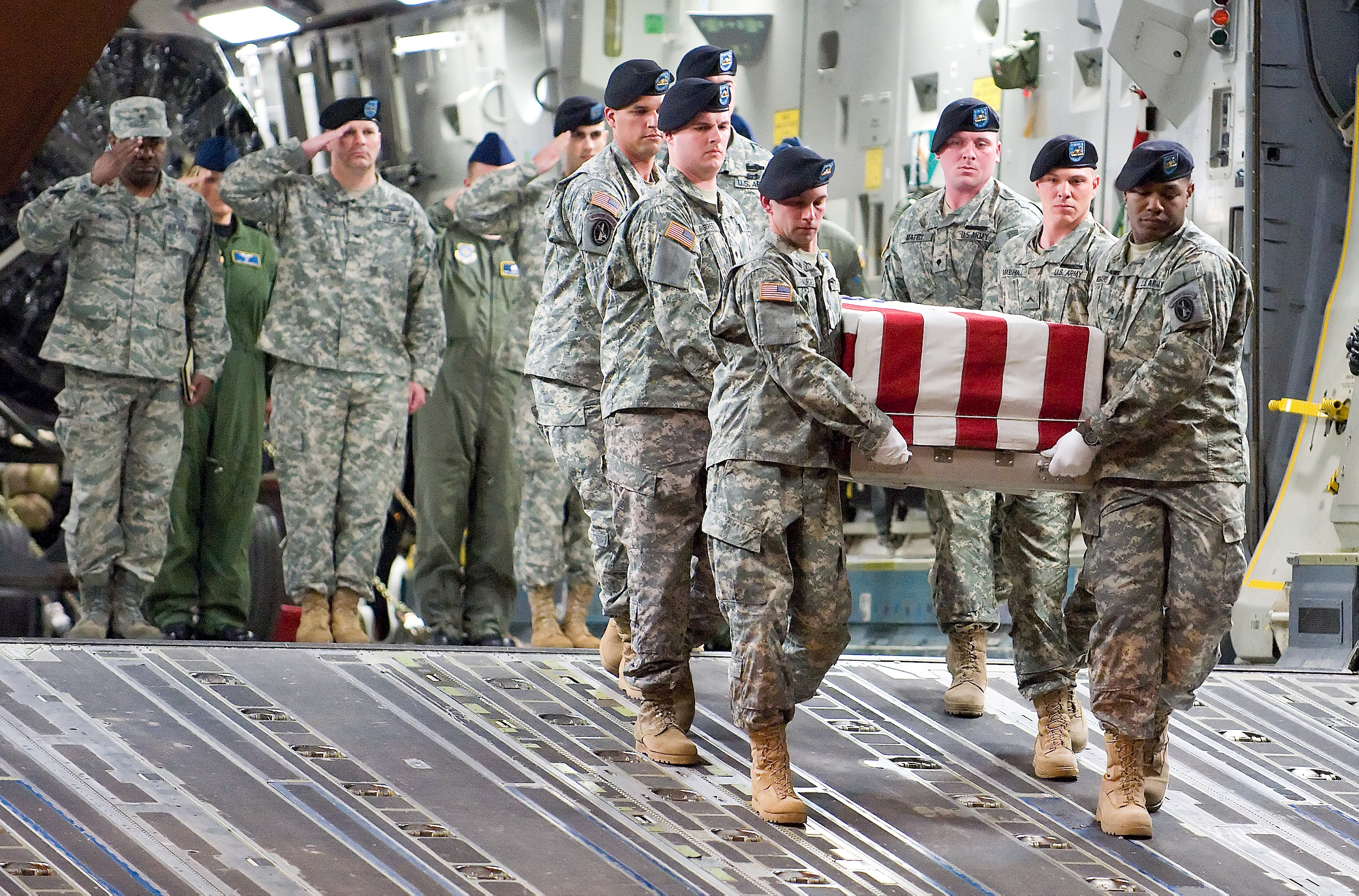
United States Army soldiers unload the remains of Specialist Israel Candelaria Mejias, killed in combat operations in Iraq in 2009.

In the United States Armed Forces, a dignified transfer is a procedure honoring the return of the remains of a servicemember from the theater of operations where they have died in the service of the United States. The transfer is conducted upon arrival at Dover Air Force Base, Delaware, from the arriving aircraft to a transfer vehicle, which then proceeds to the Charles C. Carson Center for Mortuary Affairs.

US military officials do not designate the dignified transfer as a ceremony so that loved ones of the deceased do not feel obliged to attend. Instead, it is described as "a solemn movement of the transfer case".

A dignified transfer is conducted for every U.S. military member who dies in a theater of operation while in the service of their country. A senior ranking officer of the fallen member's branch of service presides over each dignified transfer, with a carry team made up of members of the same branch. Per Department of Defense policy, the remains are returned to the deceased's loved ones as quickly as possible, either by direct flight to Dover from the field, or via Ramstein Air Base, Germany. At Dover, each transfer case is moved one by one from the aircraft to the waiting vehicle, usually a truck.

== History ==
Media access to most dignified transfers was prohibited from 1991 to 2009.

Since March 2009, media attendance is predicated on the consent of the surviving family of the deceased. Coverage is further restricted only to personnel who died in the line of duty supporting certain operations, such as Enduring Freedom, Iraqi Freedom and Inherent Resolve.

=== Notable dignified transfers ===
On August 9, 2011, President Barack Obama, U.S. Secretary of Defense Leon Panetta and Chairman of the Joint Chiefs of Staff Adm. Mike Mullen, among other leaders, attended the dignified transfer for 38 U.S. and Afghan personnel killed aboard a helicopter shot down in Afghanistan three days earlier.

On August 29, 2021, President Joe Biden and First Lady Jill Biden attended the dignified transfer of 13 service members killed in the 2021 Kabul airport attack in Kabul, Afghanistan.

On March 7, 2026, President Donald Trump attended the dignified transfer of the first six service members killed in the 2026 Iran War. The president's decision to wear a white baseball cap emblazoned with the letters "USA" drew criticism for showing lack of respect for the fallen.
