= Tony Boselli =

American football player and executive (born 1972)

Jacksonville Jaguars
- Title: Executive vice president of football operations

Personal information
- Born: April 17, 1972 (age 54); Modesto, California, U.S.
- Listed height: 6 ft 7 in (2.01 m)
- Listed weight: 324 lb (147 kg)

Career information
- Position: Offensive tackle (No. 71)
- High school: Fairview (Boulder, Colorado)
- College: USC (1991–1994)
- NFL draft: 1995: 1st round, 2nd overall pick
- Expansion draft: 2002: 1st round, 1st overall pick

Career history

Playing
- Jacksonville Jaguars (1995–2001); Houston Texans (2002)

Operations
- Jacksonville Jaguars (2025–present) Executive vice president of football operations

Awards and highlights
- As a player: 3× First-team All-Pro (1997–1999); 5× Pro Bowl (1996–2000); PFWA All-Rookie Team (1995); NFL 1990s All-Decade Team; Pride of the Jaguars; Jacksonville Jaguars No. 71 retired; Consensus All-American (1994); First-team All-American (1992); Morris Trophy (1994); 3× First-team All-Pac-10 (1991, 1992, 1994)

Career NFL statistics
- Games played: 91
- Games started: 90
- Fumble recoveries: 5
- Stats at Pro Football Reference
- Pro Football Hall of Fame
- College Football Hall of Fame

Don Bosco Anthony Boselli Jr. (born April 17, 1972) is an American professional football executive and former offensive tackle who is the executive vice president of football operations for the Jacksonville Jaguars of the National Football League (NFL). Boselli previously played in the NFL for seven seasons with the Jaguars. He played college football for the USC Trojans, winning the Morris Trophy in 1994. Boselli was the first player drafted by the Jaguars, who selected him second overall in the 1995 NFL draft.

During his tenure in Jacksonville, Boselli established himself as one of the franchise's most productive and popular players. He was named to five Pro Bowls and three first-team All-Pros while appearing in two AFC Championship Games. Following his Jaguars career, he was the first selection in the 2002 NFL expansion draft by the Houston Texans, but retired without playing for them due to injuries. Boselli rejoined the Jaguars as an executive in 2025. In 2006, his success with Jacksonville made him the first person inducted into the Pride of the Jaguars. He was later inducted into the College Football Hall of Fame in 2014 and the Pro Football Hall of Fame in 2022, becoming the first Jaguar enshrined in the latter.

== College career ==
Boselli accepted an athletic scholarship to attend the University of Southern California, where he played for the Trojans from 1991 to 1994. He was a first-team All-Pac-10 selection and a first-team All-American in 1992, 1993 and 1994. In 1994, he also won the Morris Trophy. While he was an undergraduate, he was initiated as a member of the Sigma Alpha Epsilon fraternity. Boselli was named to the College Football Hall of Fame in 2014.

== Professional career ==
Pre-draft measurables
Height	Weight	Arm length	Hand span	40-yard dash	10-yard split	20-yard split	20-yard shuttle	Vertical jump	Broad jump	Bench press
6 ft 6 7/8 in (2.00 m)	323 lb (147 kg)	33 1/2 in (0.85 m)	10 in (0.25 m)	5.23 s	1.82 s	3.05 s	4.60 s	30.0 in (0.76 m)	8 ft 6 in (2.59 m)	26 reps
All values from NFL Combine

Boselli was selected as the second pick of the 1995 NFL draft, the first-ever draft pick of the new Jacksonville Jaguars franchise. As a result of his professional success and local popularity, Jacksonville-area McDonald's restaurants offered the "Boselli Burger" in his honor for a period of time.

He was selected by the Houston Texans with the first pick in the 2002 expansion draft. He spent the entire season on injured reserve and retired in July 2003. Boselli believes complications from a botched surgery on his left shoulder ended his career.

As a sign of his success in Jacksonville, on October 8, 2006, he was the first player inducted into the Pride of the Jaguars (the team's Hall of Fame) and signed a symbolic one-day contract allowing him to retire officially as a Jaguar. Boselli was inducted to the Pro Football Hall of Fame on February 10, 2022, becoming the first Jaguars player to receive the honor.

== Life after football ==
Boselli participated in numerous business ventures during and after his professional football career. Along with former teammates Mark Brunell and Bryan Schwartz, he invested in seven Mattress Firm bedding stores in Jacksonville. By the time Boselli left for Texas in 2002, he had sold his interest in the company. Boselli and Brunell own all Whataburger franchise locations in the Jacksonville area. He also works as the offensive line coach at the Episcopal School of Jacksonville, on the same coaching staff as Brunell.

Boselli is also a founding partner in IF Marketing with friends and former teammates Jeff Novak and Will Furrer. The marketing and advertising firm, with offices in Georgetown, Texas and Jacksonville, Florida, was originally called Intra Focus marketing & advertising.

== Executive career ==
=== Jacksonville Jaguars ===
On February 3, 2025, Boselli was hired as the executive vice president of football operations for the Jaguars.

== Personal life ==
Since 2005, Boselli has lived in Ponte Vedra Beach, Florida with his wife, Angi and their five children, Andrew, Adam, Ashli, Alexis, and Ansli. Boselli has lost a significant amount of weight and now participates in triathlons.

Boselli's son Andrew received an athletic scholarship to attend Florida State University, and played for the Florida State Seminoles football team. While Adam played tight end collegiately for Florida Atlantic.

== Sports broadcasting ==
In 2007, Boselli was hired as a color commentator on regional NFL telecasts for Fox, teaming with Ron Pitts. In his rookie season as a televised commentator, Boselli drew praise as one of the best in the business. From 2009 to 2012, he worked as a game analyst and sideline reporter for Westwood One's coverage of the NFL. Beginning in 2013, he joined the Jacksonville Jaguars radio play by play team.

Boselli was a former co-host on 1010 XL with Dan Hicken and Jeff Prosser each morning from 6–10 am on Sports Final Radio. He still appears part-time as a call-in guest.

Boselli was interviewed for an episode of NFL's Greatest Games which aired on ESPN2.

== Charity ==
Boselli and his wife created the Boselli Foundation in 1995 in Jacksonville to work with at-risk youth, and help them to cultivate high self-esteem and to succeed at home, at school, and at play. Beginning in 2007, he has spent substantial time working on projects with the foundation. He overcame opposition from local politicians when the Boselli Foundation proposed renovating and reopening a closed community center.
