= Mortuary Affairs =

US military service specialty

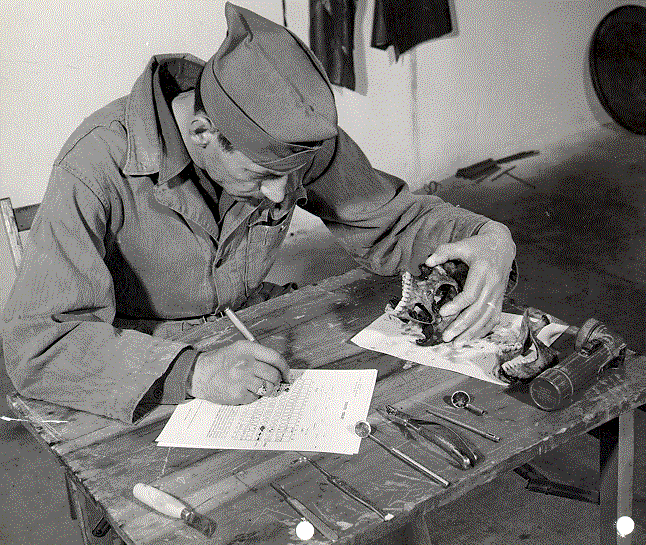
A soldier from a graves registration unit attempts identification of a skull during World War II

Mortuary Affairs is a service within the United States Army Quartermaster Corps tasked with the recovery, identification, transportation, and preparation for burial of deceased American and American-allied military personnel. The human remains of enemy or non-friendly persons are collected and returned to their respective governments or affiliations. The Air Force has a similar facility at Dover AFB in Delaware, manned by the Army's Mortuary Affairs Personnel.

Until 1991, the army's mortuary affairs was known as the Graves Registration Service (GRS or GRREG). The Graves Registration Service was created several months after the United States entered World War I. The current Army Military Occupational Specialty for the career field is 92A (a general code for officers across the Quartermaster Corps) with a 4-Victor qualification course completion and 92M for enlisted personnel.

== Responsibilities ==
Mortuary Affairs is responsible for retrieval, identification, transportation, and burial of American soldiers. Retrieval can be further subdivided into:

- Combat Recovery – Recovery while combat is still ongoing.
- Post-Combat Recovery – Recovery of the dead immediately after combat has ceased. Danger from mines and enemy snipers is still quite high. Until the 20th century, it was commonplace for combatants to call battlefield truces, in which combatants would temporarily cease fire to allow for the collection of their dead. This practice has ceased in modern warfare.
- Area/Theater Recovery
- Historical Recovery

The role of the Mortuary Affairs service is legally defined in 10 USC, subtitle A, Chapter 75, Subchapter I, section 1471.

Mortuary Affairs has historically been tied with investigation of war crimes. Following World War II, Graves Registration Personnel were instructed to forward all pathological evidence indicating war crimes to the War Crimes Commission.

The Mortuary Affairs Creed is 'Dignity, Reverence, Respect.'

== History ==
=== Pre-World War I ===
In the Seminole Wars and Mexican–American War, American soldiers were buried near where they fell, with no effort made to return and little effort made to identify the dead. The American Civil War marked the first time the United States made a concerted effort to identify fallen soldiers. General Orders No. 75 specified that field commanders were responsible for identification and burial efforts. However, these efforts were not well organized or executed, and were often given low priority. (Commanders were more concerned with winning battles than with the disposition of fallen soldiers). After the war, remains of Union soldiers were disinterred and reburied in National Cemeteries.

During the Spanish–American War, the United States initiated a policy of returning soldiers killed on foreign soil back to next-of-kin in the United States, the first country in the world to do so. Quartermaster General Marshall I. Ludington spoke words that became a harbinger of U.S. retrieval efforts in major world conflicts only a few years later. He said the efforts of the Quartermaster Corps in the Spanish–American War were most likely the first attempt of a nation to "disinter the remains of all its soldiers who, in defense of their country, had given up their lives on a foreign shore, and bring them... to their native land for return to their relatives and friends or their reinternment in the beautiful cemeteries which have been provided by our Government for its defenders."

During the Philippine–American War, the Burial Corps and United States Army Morgue and Office of Identification had overlapping responsibilities for care of the dead.

=== World War I ===
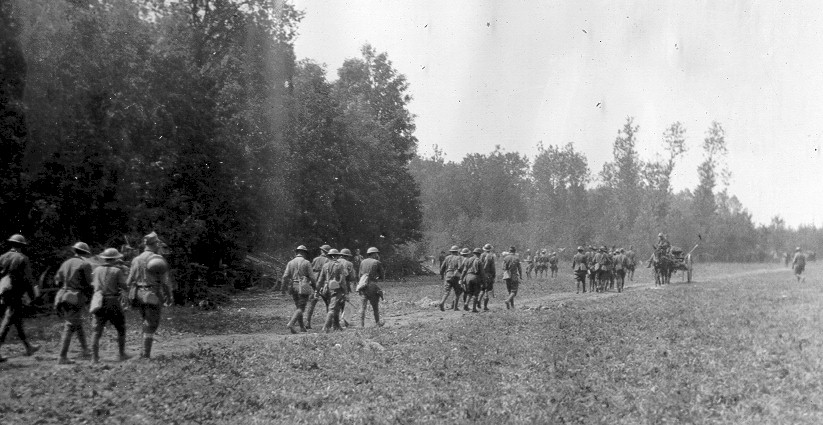
A burial detail from the US 42nd division during World War I, July 30, 1918

The Graves registration service was created by General Order #104, issued on August 7, 1917, four months after the United States entered World War I. It consolidated the existing departments into the Graves Registration Service. At its inception, the Graves registration service consisted of the 301st, 302nd, 303rd, and 304th Grave Registration Units. They were deployed to Europe during the war. Many of the men that served in these units had been incapacitated for field service.

=== World War II ===
The Graves Registration Service ceased to exist during the Interwar period. This led to difficulties reactivating the service at the beginning of World War II. Despite these initial difficulties, by the end of the war, the Graves Registration service consisted of more than 30 active companies and 11 separately numbered platoons.

At the end of World War II, the Graves Registration service was again effectively disbanded.

=== Korean War ===
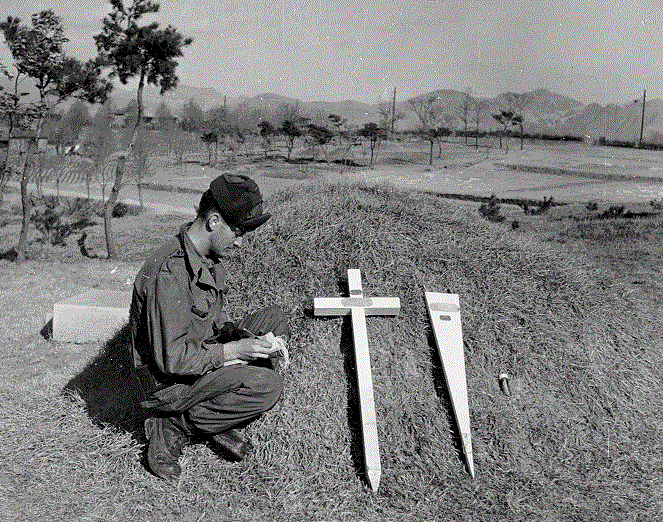
A corporal from the 114th Graves Registration Company fills out a Form 52B, giving information regarding a deceased American soldier at the U.N. Cemetery at Daegu, South Korea. At right are (left to right), a cross, an unidentified soldier marker (triangular) and small bottle containing Form 1042 which is buried with the soldier.

The onset of the Korean War caused many problems for the Graves Registration Service. Only one platoon was available in the entire theater. "As the conflict grew in intensity, and deaths of United Nations personnel increased, it became necessary for each combat division to establish and operate its own cemetery, pending the arrival of graves registration companies from the zone of interior to assume this responsibility." The rugged terrain and difficult lines of communication further hampered Graves Registration Service activities. Shifts in the momentum of the war meant that it was not uncommon for whole cemeteries to be disinterred and moved elsewhere.

Starting on Christmas Day in 1950, the United States changed its policies regarding the handling of soldiers who had been killed in action. Rather than burying them in temporary cemeteries for return at a future date after the conclusion of the war, soldiers killed in action were immediately returned to the United States. This policy, known as concurrent return, remains in effect to this day.

=== Vietnam War ===
Better transportation, communication, and laboratory techniques allowed a higher rate of body identification in the Vietnam War than in previous conflicts. 96% of Americans killed in action were recovered, compared to 78% for both World War II and Korea. By the end of the war, only 28 recovered bodies remained unidentified. All but one of them were identified by 1984, when the last one was interred in the Tomb of the Unknowns. (Using mitochondrial DNA, in 1998, the last unknown was identified as Michael Blassie.)

=== Iraq War and War in Afghanistan ===
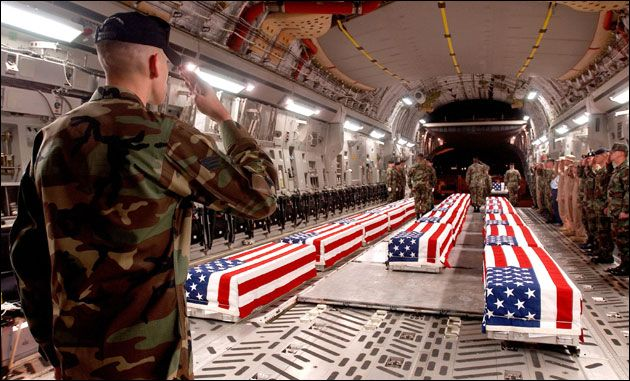
Remains returning to Dover Air Force Base's Charles C. Carson Center for Mortuary Affairs

The 54th Quartermaster Company and 111th Quartermaster Company were the Army's only standing, permanent mortuary affairs units during the wars in Iraq and Afghanistan. Mortuary affairs training took place at Fort Gregg-Adams, Virginia, and lasts about seven weeks. These soldiers search areas for hasty or unmarked graves, unburied dead, personal effects, and identification media. They also assist in preparation, preservation, and shipment of remains. The Charles C. Carson Center for Mortuary Affairs at Dover Air Force Base was where remains of those killed in action were processed and returned home.

The 92Ms have cared for the majority of the more than 4,500 military casualties in Iraq and Afghanistan. Using the language of a medical examiner, they fill out forms describing and annotating every wound and marking on the remains they receive. They also "render honors" to each soldier in their care. The Marine Corps also fielded dedicated mortuary affairs personnel during the Iraq War.

In 2008, the Department of Defense lifted its ban on media coverage (especially photographs) of the return of the remains of fallen service members. Currently, news media may be present if the survivors of the dead give their consent. The ban had been in effect for 18 years, having been instituted in 1991, at the time of the Persian Gulf War. However, the ban was waived on a large number of occasions, to the point that its existence only became widely known in 2004. When the ban was enforced at that time, it was widely criticized as politically motivated.

== Health issues ==
Studies have shown that mortuary affairs personnel have some of the highest rates of post traumatic stress disorder. Analysis has revealed three psychological components of handling remains: "the gruesomeness," "an emotional link between the viewer and the remains," and "personal threats to the remains handler." Anecdotal evidence also suggests that those involved with the removal and disposal of war-dead often have to deal with a great amount of psychological pressure later on in their lives, as well as at the time of their duties.

== See also ==
- American Battle Monuments Commission
- Commonwealth War Graves Commission
