= Air Force Mortuary Affairs Operations =

U.S. Air Force military unit

Coordinates: 39.1317°N 75.4867°W

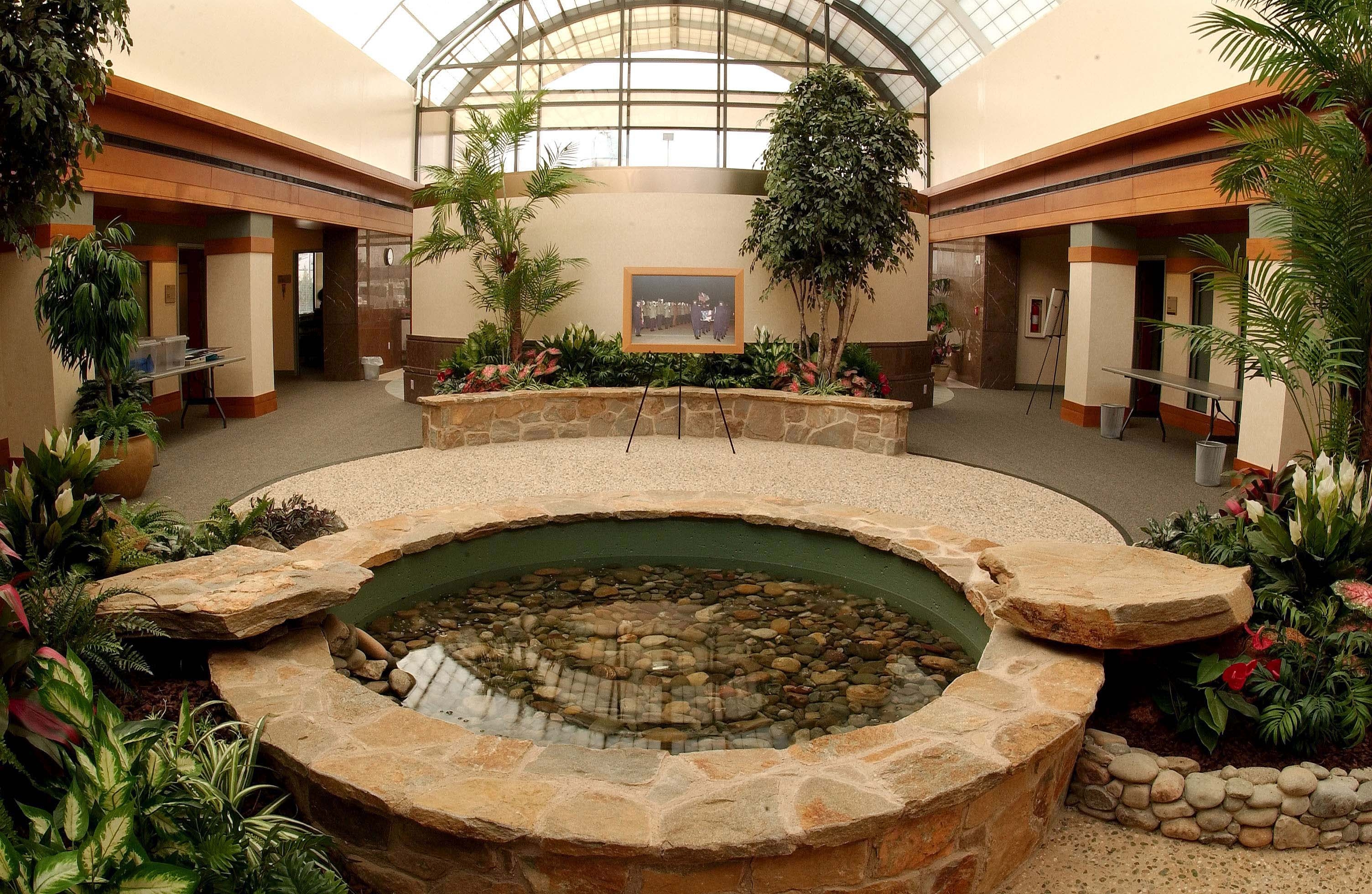
Atrium of the Center

Air Force Mortuary Affairs Operations (AFMAO) is a U.S. Air Force mortuary affairs unit located in the Charles C. Carson Center for Mortuary Affairs at Dover Air Force Base in Dover, Delaware. AFMAO combines the functions of both Air Force Mortuary Affairs and Port Mortuary, and was historically known as Dover Port Mortuary. AFMAO houses the United States' only port mortuary, the largest mortuary under the Department of Defense (DoD), and the only DoD mortuary located in the continental United States. The facility is named for mortician Charles C. Carson.

== Operations ==
AFMAO is a Field Operating Agency under the Deputy Chief of Staff, Manpower, Personnel and Services, Headquarters Air Force. AFMAO provides global contingency mortuary response teams in support of Air Force and combatant command requirements, supporting both an Air Force and joint role. It is AFMAO's mission and privilege to fulfill the nation's sacred commitment of ensuring dignity, honor and respect to the fallen, and care, service and support to their families. The mortuary staff prepares the remains of U.S. service members, as well as government officials and their families stationed abroad in Europe and Southwest Asia.

== History ==
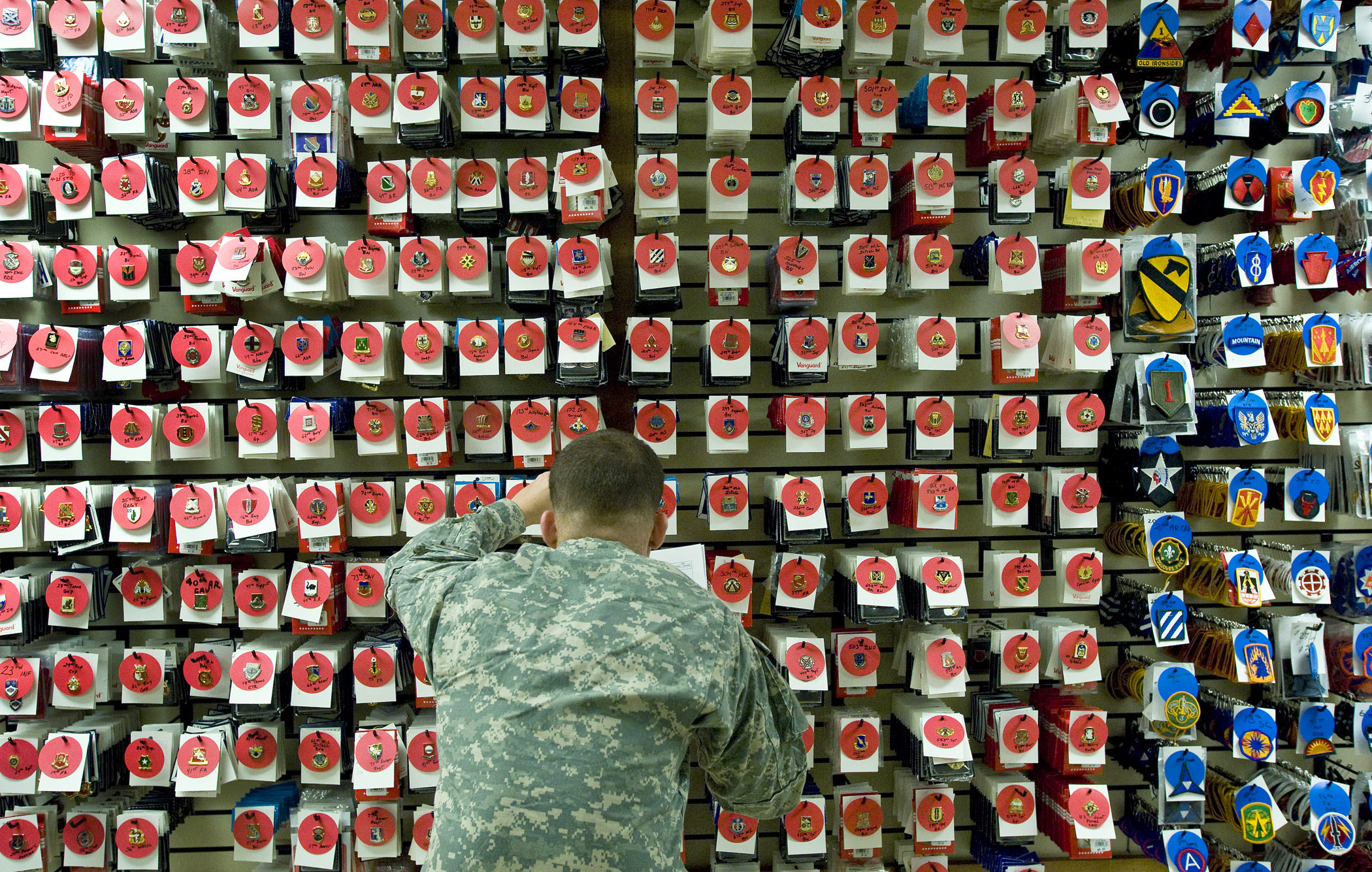
The Mortuary stocks every badge, patch, ribbon or decoration used by the U.S. Air Force, Army, Marine Corps, Navy and Coast Guard.

Air Force mortuary missions have been attached to many organizations and locations over the years. The mortuary mission in Delaware dates to 1955, when the Port Mortuary was established at Dover. Prior to the establishment of AFMAO, the port mortuary at Dover was a flight under the 436th Services Squadron. In 2001, the Dover Port Mortuary became the sole port mortuary in the continental U.S. after the mortuary at Travis Air Force Base in California closed. In 2003, the new Charles C. Carson Center for Mortuary Affairs replaced the 48-year-old facility that had been in use since 1955 to identify and process the remains of over 50,000 service members. The new $30 million mortuary is 70,000 square feet (6,500 m^{2}). In recognition of dedicated and committed services for over two decades, Dover Air Force Base named its mortuary after Charles C. Carson. AFMAO became a named activity of the Headquarters Air Force, Deputy Chief of Staff, Personnel, Services and Manpower 15 Dec. 2008. Shortly thereafter, the Headquarters Air Force Mortuary Affairs function transferred from the Air Force Services Agency, San Antonio, Texas to join the new organization. AFMAO became a Field Operating Agency 1 May 2014, aligning it directly under Headquarters Air Force leadership.

In 2010, Operating Location Europe was established at Ramstein Air Base, Germany. In June 2019, Operating Location Pacific was established at Hickam Field, Joint Base Pearl Harbor-Hickam on Oahu, Hawaii. In January 2020, AFMAO assumed administrative and operational control of OLP-Yokota, located at Yokota Air Base, Japan.

The mortuary was used in 1978 for the victims of the Jonestown mass murder-suicide, in 1986 for identifying the remains of the crew of the Space Shuttle Challenger, and in 2003 for the crew of the Space Shuttle Columbia. It was also a major site for identifying the remains of military personnel killed in the 9/11 attacks.

=== 2011 investigation ===
In 2011, a federal investigation by the United States Office of Special Counsel found the center had committed "gross mismanagement" of remains, including losing body parts, sawing off the damaged arm bone of a soldier – without telling his family – so he would fit in a casket, and lax supervision. Three supervisors were disciplined but not removed from duty.

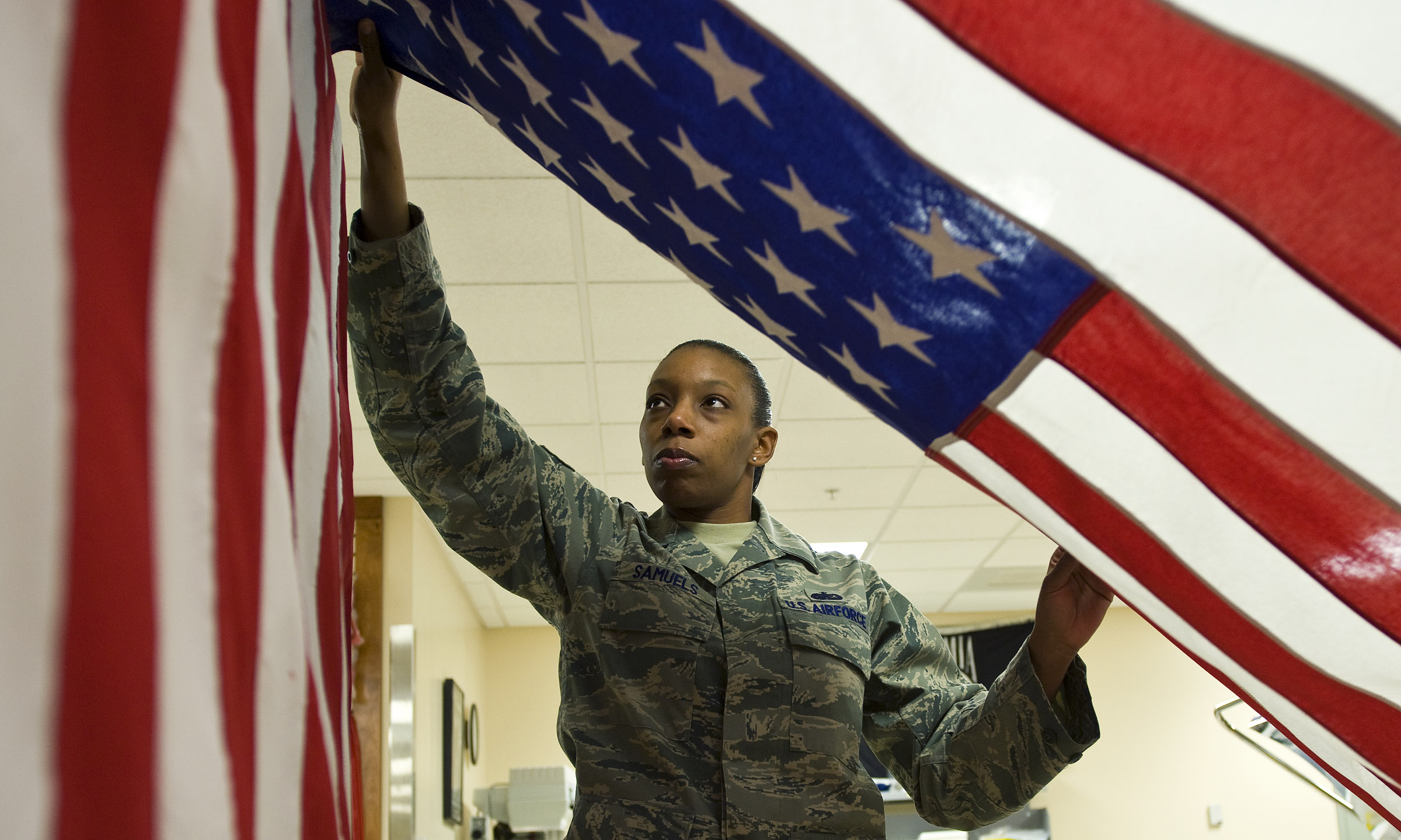
Freshly pressed U.S. flags hang in preparation to be placed over caskets.

The Special Counsel investigation found that Air Force officials had attempted to silence whistleblowers by firing them from their jobs, had falsified records, and lied to investigators. The investigation was critical of the Air Force for, in investigators' opinions, not accepting full blame for the misconduct and trying to cover it up. Colonel Robert H. Edmondson, commander of the facility from January 2009 to October 2010 was reprimanded but allowed to remain in the Air Force. Quinton R. "Randy" Keel, division director at the mortuary, was demoted in August 2011 and reassigned to a different position at the base before eventually resigning. The Special Council report was critical of the Air Force for allowing all to remain employed by the service. In response, the USAF convened a board, led by John Abizaid, to review the mortuary's operations.

A subsequent The Washington Post investigation revealed in December 2011 that the center had disposed of the partial cremated remains of 274 US military personnel in the King George County Landfill in Virginia. The remains were dumped in the landfill between 2004 and 2008.

An investigation by the US Office of Special Counsel found in January 2012 that mortuary officials had retaliated against four civilian whistleblowers involved in the issue by trying to fire two of the civilians and suspending the other two. The Office recommended further disciplinary action against Keel and said it would do so itself if the USAF failed to do so. The USAF replied that it would impose stronger discipline on Edmondson. On 21 May 2012, the USAF announced that it had given Edmondson a formal reprimand and fined him $7,000 and was allowed to remain in his positions. In June 2012, three of the civilian whistleblowers who had suffered retaliation, James G. Parsons Sr., Mary Ellen Spera, and William Zwicharowski, were honored as "public servants of the year" by the United States Office of Special Counsel.

In February 2012 it was revealed that the mortuary had improperly disposed of remains of September 11 attacks victims in a landfill. According to The Washington Post, mortuary and Dover officials suggested disposing of the remains at sea, but were overruled by an unidentified USAF officer at Air Mobility Command and officers at the US Army's Personnel Command, who directed that the remains be disposed of as medical waste.
