= Family of Saddam Hussein =

Family of Saddam Hussein عائِلَة صدام حسين
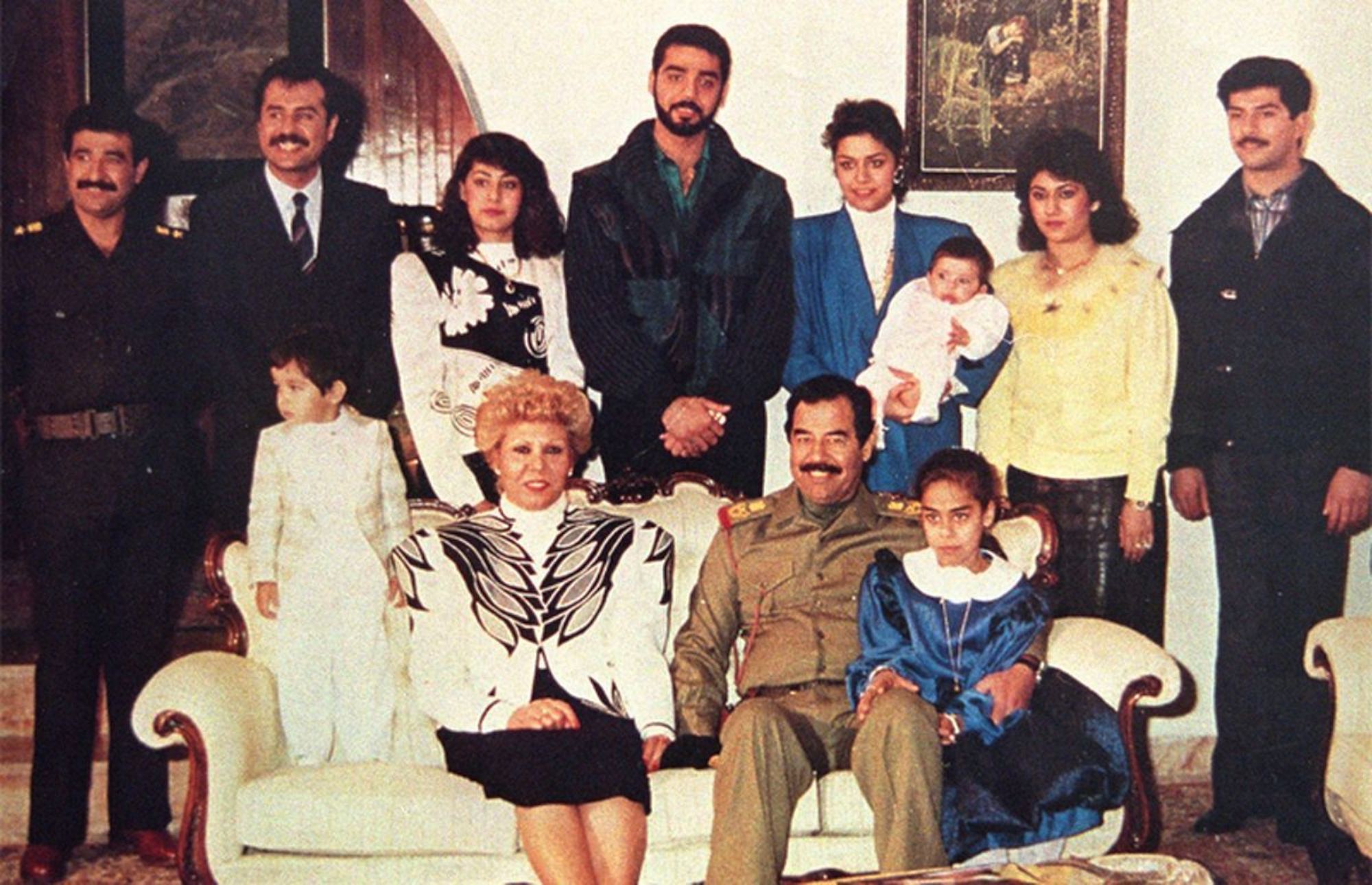
- Photograph of Saddam Hussein's family in the 1980s
- Parent family: Al-Bu Nasir
- Country: Ba'athist Iraq
- Origin: Al-Awja, Tikrit, Saladin Governorate
- Members: Saddam Hussein; Sajida Talfah; Uday Hussein; Qusay Hussein; Raghad Hussein; Rana Hussein
- Connected families: Subha, Al Safi, Khairallah, Majid, Rashid, and Saddam

The Tulfah family was the family of Saddam Hussein of Ba'athist Iraq, the party which ruled from 1968 to 2003 and established a single party authoritarian government under the control of the Ba'ath Party until the 2003 invasion of Iraq.

Al-Tikriti family is originally from Al-Awja, about 13 kilometers from Tikrit, and are members of the minority Sunni population. They are members of the al-Bejat tribal group, a sub-group of the Al-Bu Nasir tribe. Since records are scant, the generation who controlled Iraq primarily are only known to stem from Albejat subtribe of Albunaser including the subclan of Khairallah Talfah, who later became Saddam's father-in-law. All the members of the Hussein or extended Talfah family have the Arabic surname Al-Nasseri and trace their origins to Al-Awja or several surrounding villages.

During the rule of Saddam Hussein, family connections became a crucial part of Iraqi politics and many of his close family members were in charge of the ministries, military, and the Security Services.

== Origin ==
The Talfah family descends from Talfah ibn Musalat, grandson of the emir Omar Bey III of Tikrit and army officer who died a few years after the birth of Subha. He had several children: Subha, Khairallah, Abd al-Latif and Badra.

=== Subha's family ===
- Subha Talfah (c. 1910s–1982)
  With Hussein Abd al-Majid (c. 1900s–1937)
  - Unknown son, died of cancer around at age 13 around 1937.
  - Saddam Hussein (1937–2006), President of Iraq from 1979 to 2003. Prior to that, he was vice-president during the 70s. He was married to his cousin Sajida Talfah and had five children.
- With Ibrahim al-Hassan Muhammad
  - Sabawi Ibrahim al-Tikriti (1947–2013), director of the DGS.
    - Ayman (born 1971), reported Guerrilla fighter who is aiding the Iraqi Insurgency.
    - Ibrahim (1983–2015), reported Guerrilla fighter, killed in battle.
  - Barzan Ibrahim al-Tikriti (1951–2007), director of the Mukhabarat
    - Saja, briefly married to Uday Hussein in 1993.
  - Watban (1952–2015), former Interior Minister of Iraq
  - Siham (c. mid-1930s), sister and briefly president of the Iraqi Women's Union. She was married to Arshad Yasin, private bodyguard and personal pilot of Saddam.

=== Khairallah's family ===
- Khairallah Talfah (1910–1993), Mayor of Baghdad from 1979 to 1981
  With Lilo Wahib
  - Sajida (born 1935), wife of Saddam Hussein and First Lady of Iraq from 1979 to 2003. Was a primary school teacher prior to marrying Saddam.
  - Adnan (1940–1989), Minister of Defence from (1977–89), killed in a helicopter crash though it has been alleged that he was assassinated.
  - Ilham (1955–1999), wife of Barzan Ibrahim al-Tikriti, died of cancer in 1999
- With Fatima Hassan al-Majid
  - Lo'uay Khairallah, close associate with Uday. Reportedly suffered from severe drinking problems.

=== Abd al-Latif's family ===
- Abd al-Latif Talfah (?–?)
  - Rafi (born 1954), director of the General Security
  - Hani (born 1962), director of the SSO

== Hassan Abd al-Majid's family ==
Hassan Abd al-Majid, brother of Hussein, had three sons.

- Ali (1941–2010), Secretary General of Northern Bureau of the Ba'ath Party and along with his cousin Saddam was responsible for the genocide of thousands of Kurds. He was executed by the Iraqi Government for this in 2010. He was married to a daughter of Al-Bakr.
- Hisham, Special Republican Guard Commander, Governor of Babel Province. Fled to Jordan during the 2003 invasion.
- Kamel (c. 1920–1996) Ba'ath Party official, marginalized years before his death. Executed in a firefight with his children in 1996.
  - Hussein (1954–1996), Minister of Military Industries. Saddam's son in-law. Responsible for the Chemical, Biological and Nuclear Weapons programme during the 80s. Defected to Jordan in 1995, but returned and was executed. Married to Raghad Hussein.
  - Saddam (1956–1996), Saddam's personal bodyguard. Married to Rana Hussein. Executed alongside his brother after returning from Jordan.
  - Hakim (died 1996)
  - Ilham. (died 1996)
    Married Azatdin Hisham al-Majid
- Fatima, third wife of Khairallah.
- Unknown daughter, killed in 1996 firefight alongside Kamel.

Suleiman Abd al-Majid, The only other known brother of Hussein. He was reportedly devoutly religious and did not have any known high office.

- Tahrir (died 1996), Official with the Ministry of Industry. Arrested for corruption and theft after the Gulf War. Killed in 1996 firefight with the Kamel family.
- Ala (1956–2002), Aide to Saddam and Official with the Iraqi Intelligence Service. Allegedly defected to Jordan in 2002 under unclear circumstances, only to be executed after being coerced into returning, shortly before the 2003 invasion.
- Salam, Special Republican Guard commander. One of Saddam's primary bodyguards.

== Abdul al-Rashid's family ==
The Rashids are also a member of the al-Bu Nasir Tribe and a relative of the al-Majid family but descended from Tikrit itself. All of them Wielded considerable power in the regime's later years.

- Daham Abdul al-Rashid, head of National Audit Bureau
- Taher Abdul al-Rashid, Army General, killed during the Iran–Iraq War.
- Maher Abd al-Rashid (1942–2014), Army General, father in law of Qusay .
  - Abduallah, involved in Iraqi insurgency.
  - Lama, wife of Qusay.
- Hatim Abdul Rashid, head of Arab Industrial Development Organization, Married to a daughter of Al-Bakr

== Saddam's family ==
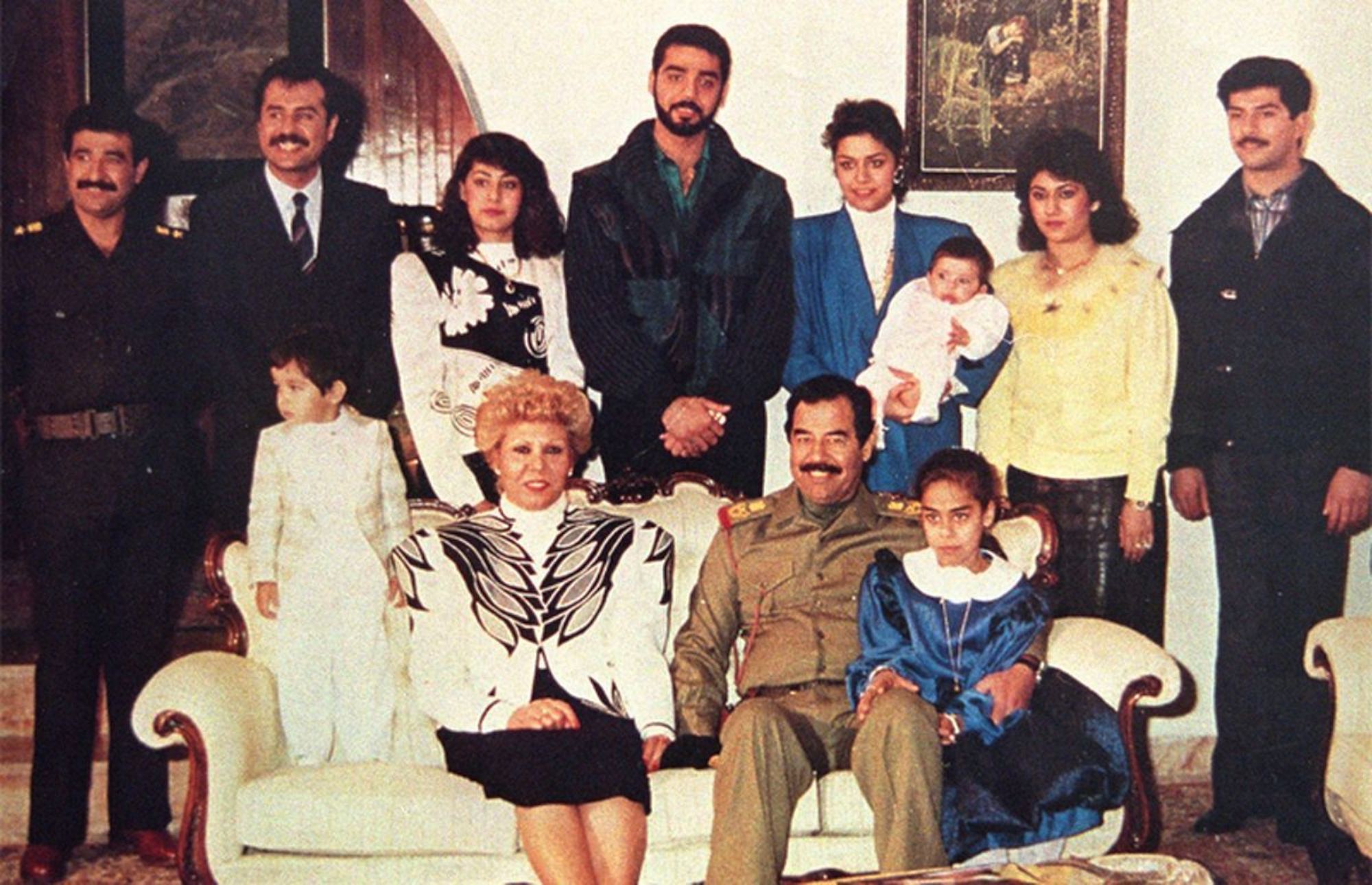
Standing (left to right): • Hussein Kamel – Son-in-law of Saddam Hussein and brother of Saddam Kamel. • Saddam Kamel – Son-in-law of Saddam Hussein and brother of Hussein Kamel. • Rana Hussein – Second daughter of Saddam Hussein and wife of Saddam Kamel. • Uday Hussein – Oldest son of Saddam Hussein. • Raghad Hussein – Oldest daughter of Saddam Hussein and wife of Hussein Kamel. • Sahar Maher Abd al-Rashid – Wife of Qusay Hussein. • Qusay Hussein – Second son of Saddam Hussein. Sitting (left to right): • Unidentified child (standing on sofa). • Sajida Talfah – First wife of Saddam Hussein. • Saddam Hussein • Hala Hussein – Third and youngest daughter of Saddam Hussein.

The only known origin of Saddam Hussein is through his father Hussein 'Abid al-Majid, who was from a family of shepherds. He was arranged to marry Subha Tulfah al-Mussallat, allegedly a village psychic, when they were teenagers. Both of them were members of the al-Khatab clan of the al-Bejat tribal group, a sub-group of the Al-Bu Nasir tribe. He disappeared several months before Saddam was born. Her situation was so poor that she allegedly attempted to abort the unborn fetus, and when that failed, she sent him away to her brother Khairallah.

After his death Subha married Ibrahim Al-Hassan, who was another illiterate shepherd (some sources claim he was actually a local bandit) from an even poorer family. She had three more sons with Ibrahim and a couple of daughters. Subha later arranged for Saddam to marry the daughter of her brother, Khairallah, when they were children, though they were never married until 1963, when Saddam was 26.

- Saddam Hussein (1937–2006), President of Iraq 1979–2003
- Sajida Talfah (born 1935), wife of Saddam and former First Lady of Iraq.
  - Uday (1964–2003), director of the Iraqi Football Association, Fedayeen Saddam, and several media corporations in Iraq including Iraqi TV and the newspaper Babel. Originally Saddam's favorite son and raised to succeed him he eventually fell out of favour due to his erratic behavior. He was married to Saja al-Tikriti, daughter of Barzan İbrahim Hasan al-Tikriti. Then he was briefly married to Izzat Ibrahim ad-Douri's daughter, but later divorced her.
  - Qusay (1966–2003), second in command of the military (behind his father) and director of the Iraqi Republican Guard and the SSO. He was Saddam's later intended successor. He was married once and had three children.
    - Mustapha (1989–2003), Qusay's son who was killed by US forces along with his father and paternal uncle
  - Raghad (born 1968), fled after the war to Amman, Jordan where she received sanctuary from the royal family. She was married to Hussein Kamel.
  - Rana (born 1969), married to Saddam Kamel and has had four children from this marriage.
  - Hala (born 1972), Saddam's third and youngest daughter. Very little information is known about her. Her father arranged for her to marry General Kamal Mustafa Abdullah in 1998. She fled with her children and sisters to Jordan, though other sources claim she could be in Qatar with her mother.
  - Ali Saddam Hussein (b. ca. 1980–1983), is Saddam’s youngest child. Almost nothing is known about him besides that his mother is Samira Shahbandar, whom Saddam married as his second wife. She was the former wife of an Iraqi Airways executive before her marriage to Saddam in 1986.

== See also ==
- List of political families
- Assad family
