= House of Saddam =

2008 TV miniseries

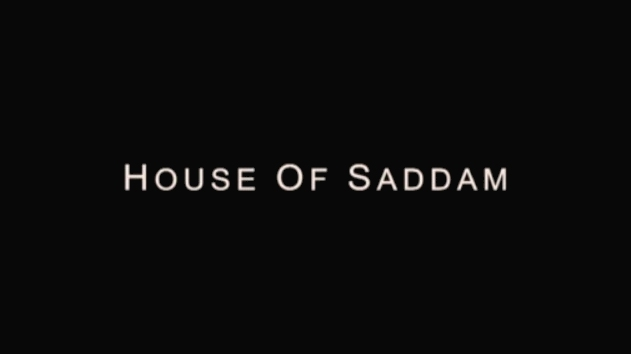
- Genre: Biographical drama; Docudrama; Historical drama
- Written by: Alex Holmes; Stephen Butchard
- Directed by: Alex Holmes; Jim O'Hanlon
- Starring: Yigal Naor; Shohreh Aghdashloo; Philip Arditti; Amr Waked; Said Taghmaoui; Christine Stephen-Daly
- Theme music composer: Samuel Sim
- Countries of origin: United Kingdom; United States
- Original language: English
- No. of episodes: 4

Production
- Executive producers: Alex Holmes; Hilary Salmon
- Producer: Steve Lightfoot
- Cinematography: Florian Hoffmeister
- Editors: Crispin Green; Philip Kloss
- Running time: 60 minutes, each episode.

Original release
- Network: BBC Two
- Release: 30 July – 20 August 2008

House of Saddam is a 2008 British docudrama television miniseries that charted the rise and fall of Saddam Hussein. A co-production between BBC Television and HBO Films, the series was first broadcast on BBC Two (in the United Kingdom) in four parts between 30 July and 20 August 2008.

== Cast ==
- Yigal Naor as Saddam Hussein, President of Iraq (1979–2003)
- Shohreh Aghdashloo as Sajida Talfah, Saddam's first wife
- Philip Arditti as Uday Hussein, Saddam's eldest son
- Mounir Margoum as Qusay Hussein, Saddam's second son
- Agni Scott as Raghad Hussein, Saddam's eldest daughter
- Shivani Ghai as Rana Hussein, Saddam's second daughter
- Amber Rose Revah as Hala Hussein, Saddam's youngest daughter
- Christine Stephen-Daly as Samira Shahbandar, Saddam's second wife
- Amr Waked as Lieutenant General Hussein Kamel, Raghad's husband, Ali Hassan's nephew, later head of the elite Republican Guard and Commander of the Iraqi Army
- Saïd Taghmaoui as Barzan Ibrahim al-Tikriti, Saddam's half brother, head of the elite Iraqi Republican Guard
- Uri Gavriel as General Ali Hassan "Chemical Ali" al-Majid, head of Mukhabarat, the Iraqi intelligence Agency and Saddam's cousin
- Said Amadis as General Adnan Khairallah, Deputy Commander-in-Chief of the Iraqi Armed Forces, Sajida's brother
- Makram Khoury as Tariq Aziz, Deputy Prime Minister, foreign minister of Iraq and Saddam's best friend
- Daniel Lundh as Colonel Saddam Kamel, Rana's husband, Hussein Kamel's brother, Ali Hassan's nephew
- Akbar Kurtha as Kamel Hana Gegeo, Saddam's personal aide and food-taster
- Jihed Mejrissi as Mohammad Barzan al-Tikriti, Saddam's nephew to half-brother Barzan
- Waleed Zuaiter as Adnan Hamdani, Minister of Planning and Saddam's best friend
- Jacqueline King as April Glaspie, U.S. ambassador to Iraq from 1988 to 1990

== Episodes ==
=== Part I ===
A pre-title sequence is set in March 2003, showing Saddam Hussein watching the broadcast of U.S. President George W. Bush's ultimatum to leave Ba'athist Iraq within forty-eight hours. As the bombing of Baghdad commences, Saddam and his family flee the Republican Palace.

1979: Shortly after the Iranian Revolution, Iraqi Vice President Saddam Hussein fears the increasing influence of the Ayatollah Ruhollah Khomeini, as well as Iraqi president Ahmed Hassan al-Bakr's proposed union with Syria. Saddam instigates the overthrow of President al-Bakr. After being appointed president, Saddam orders his maternal half-brother, Barzan Ibrahim al-Tikriti, to initiate a bloody purge of the Ba'ath Party leadership in order to wipe out "traitors". Saddam himself executes his closest friend and ally, Adnan Hamdani, as a show of strength. The Islamic Dawa Party rocks Baghdad with a series of terrorist attacks while Saddam is on a hunting trip in Tikrit with his wife Sajida Talfah and eldest son Uday.

Saddam attempts to maintain good relations with the United States as he declares war on Iran while trying to maintain his relationship with his sons Uday (Aris Sahin) and Qusay (played by Raed Khelfi). Meanwhile, he begins an affair with married school teacher Samira Shahbandar. Saddam orders the execution of two Iraqi generals after a military defeat at Khorramshahr, and turns against Barzan following the death of their mother; this puts the arranged marriage of Raghad, Saddam's daughter, and Mohammed, Barzan's son, in jeopardy. After Saddam survives an assassination attempt in the Dawa stronghold of Dujail, Barzan fears for his own life and razes the city in retribution. Saddam exiles Barzan to Switzerland and marries Raghad to Hussein Kamel al-Majid, forming an alliance with the al-Majid clan. Hussein Kamel takes over Barzan's post and becomes the new leader of the Special Republican Guard, a security force charged with protecting Saddam and his rule.

=== Part II ===
1988: As the war with Iran ends, an unstable Uday fires a gun in a Baghdad nightclub. Meanwhile, Saddam declares victory over Iran, even though Iraq has suffered heavy losses and is facing bankruptcy; the Iraqi economy is also being hampered by Kuwait, which is over-producing oil and driving down its price. Sajida learns that Saddam has married Samira as a second wife, and blames his trusted valet, Kamel Hana Gegeo, for assisting their affair. Uday almost kills the valet for the sake of his mother's honour, sparing him only so that he can control him when he succeeds his father. Hussein Kamel attempts to rise within the regime's inner circle by sowing mistrust between Saddam and Adnan Khairallah, Sajida's brother. Saddam's foreign minister, Tariq Aziz, travels to an OPEC meeting in Geneva and reveals that Kuwait has been slant drilling into Iraqi oil fields, demanding that the Kuwaitis cease.

Saddam's new marriage to Samira leaves Uday fearful that the couple's presumptive children will jeopardize his status as Saddam's heir. Uday confronts Kamel Hana at a late-night party and beats him to death to the horror of witnesses. After having Uday arrested, Saddam ponders on killing his first-born son in his cell. Adnan Khairallah questions Uday's abilities as Iraq's future leader, but is not supported by Hussein Kamel, who continues to gain Saddam's trust. Not long after, Adnan is killed in a suspicious helicopter explosion. Sajida confronts Saddam about her brother's death, but he dismisses her with claims that it was merely an accident.

1990-1991: Saddam meets with April Glaspie, the U.S. ambassador to Iraq, and takes her statement of "no opinion" as giving him tacit approval to invade Kuwait. However, President George H. W. Bush immediately decries the action and organizes an international coalition to drive out Saddam's forces. Saddam refuses to back down, and is forced to move between safe-houses as the Gulf War commences with the U.S.-led bombing of Baghdad. Samira is seriously injured in a car accident during the bombings. The Iraqi Army is quickly forced into retreat as the coalition unleashes its ground offensive. However, the U.S. declares a ceasefire and withdraws from the Iraqi border, leaving Saddam defiant as American bombers drop propaganda leaflets encouraging Iraqis to stand against him.

=== Part III ===
1995: The Gulf War has left Iraq economically crippled. The United Nations refuses to lift sanctions unless the government agrees to dismantle Iraq's weapons of mass destruction. Saddam states he has nothing to hide, resulting in a stand-off between him and the U.N.'s chief weapons inspector, Rolf Ekeus. Saddam is more preoccupied with tracing his roots than with the U.N. stand-off, and ignores his other son, Qusay, when he tries to warn his father about Uday's erratic behaviour. Instead, Saddam presents a family tree purportedly proving a familial relation to the Islamic prophet Muhammad. Qusay is clearly worried about his father's state of mind, but quietly leaves him to his devices.

The rivalry between General Hussein Kamel and Uday spirals out of control, as the heir apparent pelts the general with food at a dinner with Saddam's closest allies. The frustrated Hussein Kamel states his disillusionment with Saddam's regime, which allows the spoiled Uday to run wild with impunity. His patience finally ends when Uday hijacks a shipment of medical supplies intended for Hussein Kamel's brother, Saddam Kamel. The brothers discuss Hussein Kamel's plan to cooperate with Ekeus and the CIA, hoping that he will be installed as Iraq's new president after Saddam is overthrown.

During a holiday celebrating Iraq's "victory" over Iran, the Kamel brothers cross the border to Jordan with their wives, Raghad and Rana Hussein. The women, Saddam's daughters, warn their husbands of the potential consequences should Saddam discover their absences. Meanwhile, at a holiday party, Uday rapes a waitress. Qusay realises that his sisters are missing and notifies Saddam. In Jordan, King Hussein grants the self-exiled group asylum just as Saddam declares them traitors in Iraq.

Hussein Kamel plans to oust Saddam with Western support, and to reveal state secrets once installed as president. His plans are undermined when Saddam decides to reveal the information himself. Kamel becomes increasingly isolated in Jordan, and begins to lose the support of the king and the CIA. Saddam has Sajida talk their daughters into coming back to Iraq, promising her that they will be safe upon their return. He also offers a pardon to the Kamel brothers. Believing he will be forgiven, and disturbed by his increasing loss of social status, Hussein Kamel and the others return despite warnings from Raghad and Rana.

Once they return to Baghdad, Hussein and Saddam Kamel are humiliated by Uday and Qusay, who force them to divorce their wives and strip them of their Iraqi uniforms and ranks. However, they allow them to return to their family home, while Raghad and Rana go to their mother's house. Saddam Hussein then tells General Ali Hassan al-Majid that the honor of the al-Majid clan will be tainted as long as the pair go unpunished. Ali subsequently surrounds the brothers' house with troops, offering the brothers weapons so that they can die fighting. In a pitched battle, Hussein and Saddam Kamel are killed.

=== Part IV ===
2003: Saddam, along with Uday, Qusay and Aziz, watch television reports of the unfolding U.S. Invasion of Iraq. Qusay seizes Saddam's money from the Central Bank of Iraq on his father's orders. Meanwhile, Saddam orders his troops, particularly those from the Special Republican Guard, to fiercely resist the U.S.-led coalition forces. During a meeting with his sons in a Baghdad restaurant, Saddam advises Qusay to take care of Uday, who is commanding the Fedayeen Saddam paramilitary force.

On 9 April, Saddam is forced from power as U.S. forces take over Baghdad. As U.S. troops begin manhunts for all the high-ranking regime members, Saddam flees to rural Tikrit and goes underground with his loyal confidants. He phones Samira from a call box and tells her to leave for Lebanon. Saddam hides out in a rustic building with his remaining bodyguards. He befriends Ahmed, a lively local boy who initially does not know his identity. Saddam broadcasts messages from his hideout insisting that the Iraqi people continue to resist the U.S. occupation. Meanwhile, Sajida and her family anxiously watch news coverage of the war.

Uday, Qusay and Qusay's son Mustapha take refuge at a house in Mosul. Uday wishes to flee, but Qusay contemptuously refuses. Saddam is informed that there is a monetary reward for his family's betrayal, but he insists that they will not be caught. However, the owner of Uday and Qusay's safehouse betrays them to the Americans, and a large number of 101st Airborne Division troops surround the building with tanks and APCs. After refusing to give themselves up, and exchanging fire with the troops, the Americans fire a rocket at their position and all three are killed. Sajida is distressed to learn of her sons' deaths from TV news.

After being informed of the deaths, Saddam secretly visits the graves of his sons and grandson, laying Iraqi flags on them. He continues trying to rally the Iraqi people against U.S. forces, saying that his fallen sons are heroes of jihad. Saddam's bodyguards build a tunnel where the former dictator can hide, but one of them is captured by U.S. troops when he visits his girlfriend. Saddam decides to move elsewhere, but Ahmed warns him of U.S. patrols. He offers to hide Saddam, but the former president refuses to involve him. In Operation Red Dawn, Saddam is captured and taken into custody.

2006: Saddam is placed on trial for crimes against humanity and is sentenced to death by hanging for five different crimes against humanity, including the Dujail Massacre.

== Reception ==
=== Critical response ===
On the review aggregator website Rotten Tomatoes, the series holds an approval rating of 60% based on 20 reviews, with an average rating of 5.56/10. The website's critical consensus states, "House of Saddam is anchored by a commanding performance from Igal Naor's, but the miniseries offers shallow insight into the fallen tyrant and the history he helped shape." On Metacritic, it has a weighted average score of 62 out of 100, based on 13 critics, indicating "generally favorable" reviews.

The Independent newspaper described the drama as "The Sopranos with Scud missiles", adding that it was good entertainment but that it seemed to gloss over early US and British support for Saddam's regime. Nancy Banks Smith of The Guardian also compared it to The Sopranos ("without the jokes"), and judged it to be "an extraordinarily ambitious attempt and it succeeds very well". Tim Teeman in The Times described it as "convincing and chilling... It was soap (the feeling of Dallas was heightened by the late-1970s/early-1980s tacky glam: check out Saddam's glass lift), it was reality, it was cheeky and it was terrifying." Serena Davis of The Daily Telegraph objected to some "clunking" expository dialogue explaining political events, but was impressed that "Naor's towering version of the dictator envisioned him as both adept family schemer and political giant."

=== Viewership ===
==== United Kingdom ====
- Part I (BBC Two 2008-07-30): 2.7 million viewers (59% audience share).
- Part II (BBC Two 2008-08-06): 2.3 million viewers (11% audience share).
- Part III (BBC Two 2008-08-13): 1.8 million viewers (8% audience share).
- Part IV (BBC Two 2008-08-20): 1.5 million viewers (6% audience share).

==== United States ====
HBO miniseries House of Saddam attracted approximately 1.1 Million viewers on its debut.

==== Australia ====
House of Saddam screened in 2009 on Showcase through Foxtel, Optus TV, and Austar.

=== Accolades ===
Year	Award	Category	Nominee(s)	Result	Ref.
2008	Royal Television Society Awards	Best Costume Design – Drama	Alexandra Caulfield	Nominated	
2008	Royal Television Society Awards	Best Make Up Design – Drama	Marella Shearer	Won	
2008	Royal Television Society Awards	Best Production Design – Drama	Maurice Cain	Nominated	
2009	British Academy Television Awards	Best Drama Serial	Steve Lightfoot, Alex Holmes, and Stephen Butchard	Nominated	
2009	British Academy Television Craft Awards	Best Director – Fiction/Entertainment	Alex Holmes	Nominated	
2009	British Academy Television Craft Awards	Best Costume Design	Alexandra Caulfield	Nominated	
2009	British Academy Television Craft Awards	Best Make Up and Hair Design	Marella Shearer	Nominated	
2009	British Academy Television Craft Awards	Best Photography and Lighting – Fiction/Entertainment	Florian Hoffmeister	Nominated	
2009	NAACP Image Awards	Outstanding Television Movie, Mini-Series or Dramatic Special		Nominated	
2009	Online Film & Television Association Awards	Best Miniseries		Nominated	
2009	Online Film & Television Association Awards	Best Supporting Actress in a Motion Picture or Miniseries	Shohreh Aghdashloo	Won	
2009	Online Film & Television Association Awards	Best Costume Design in a Motion Picture or Miniseries		Nominated	
2009	Primetime Emmy Awards	Outstanding Supporting Actress in a Miniseries or a Movie	Shohreh Aghdashloo	Won	
2009	Primetime Creative Arts Emmy Awards	Outstanding Casting for a Miniseries, Movie or Special	Elaine Grainger	Nominated	
2009	Primetime Creative Arts Emmy Awards	Outstanding Costumes for a Miniseries, Movie or Special	Alexandra Caulfield and Lupt Utama (for "Part 1")	Nominated	
2009	Primetime Creative Arts Emmy Awards	Outstanding Hairstyling for a Miniseries or Movie	Marella Shearer and Juliette Vankay	Nominated	
2009	Women's Image Network Awards	Outstanding Actress Made for Television Movie / Mini-Series	Shohreh Aghdashloo	Nominated	
