= Talfah =

Talfah is a surname. Notable people with the surname include:

- Khairallah Talfah (1919–1993), Iraqi politician
- Sajida Talfah (born c. 1935), wife of Iraqi President Saddam Hussein
