= Walid Hamid Tawfiq =

Governor of Basra, Iraq, from 2002 to 2003

- وليد حميد توفيق التكريتي

Governor of Basra
- In office September 2002 – 29 April 2003
- President: Saddam Hussein
- Succeeded by: Wael Abdul Latif

Director of the Iraqi Special Security Organization
- In office June 2001 – September 2002
- President: Saddam Hussein
- Preceded by: Qusay Hussein
- Succeeded by: Hani Tulfah

Personal details
- Born: Walid Hamid Tawfiq al-Tikriti; 1954 (age 71–72) Baghdad, Kingdom of Iraq
- Party: Arab Socialist Ba'ath Party
- Nickname: Walid Hamid Tawfiq al-Nasiri

Military service
- Allegiance: Iraq
- Branch/service: Iraqi Army
- Rank: Major General

Walid Hamid Tawfiq al-Nasiri al-Tikriti (Arabic: وليد حميد توفيق الناصري التكريتي; born 1954) was the Governor of Basra from September 2002 to April 2003 and the Director of the Iraqi Special Security Organization from June 2001 to September 2002.

== Career ==
Walid was born in 1954 in Baghdad. He replaced Saddam Hussein's Qusay Hussein as the commander of the Iraqi Special Security Organization in June 2001, and served in this capacity until September 2002. Unlike Qusay, Walid was an experienced army officer. He was, however, required to report directly to Qusay about security matters. He was reappointed to his position of Governor of Basra in September 2002.

=== Iraq War ===
Walid was number 44 on the list of 55 most wanted members of Saddam Hussein's administration drawn up by the United States during the invasion of Iraq. He was represented by the eight of clubs.

The U.S.-led Coalition took control of Baghdad in early April 2003 following the Battle of Baghdad. On 29 April 2003, Walid, accompanied by his father, drove themselves to an office of the Iraqi National Congress in Baghdad, where they were met by both American and INC officials and surrendered. His surrender brought the number of top Iraqis held by the Coalition to 15.

=== Trial ===
Walid was sentenced to 15 years in prison for his involvement in the suppression of the 1991 Iraqi uprisings. He was released from al-Hoot prison on 25 June 2020, after serving his full term.
