= Samira Shahbandar =

Second wife of Saddam Hussein

- Born: 1946 (age 79–80); Baghdad, Kingdom of Iraq
- Occupation: Physician
- Spouse: Saddam Hussein (m. 1986; died 2006)

Samira Shahbandar (Arabic: سميرة الشاهبندر, born 1946) is an Iraqi former physician and the second wife of Saddam Hussein, the president of Iraq from 1979 to 2003.

== Early life ==
Shahbandar was born in Baghdad, Iraq in 1946 into an aristocratic Baghdad family.

== Career ==
Shahbandar was reported to have had careers as a flight attendant and as a physician. She was a teacher.

== Personal life ==
Shahbandar was married to Noureddine Al Safi, a pilot and manager of Iraqi Airways. They have two children. Shahbandar's son Mohammad Saffi was born in 1966.

In 1979, Shahbandar met Saddam Hussein, whom she reportedly had a son named Ali with. Saddam's eldest son Uday was reported to have envied him. Saddam Hussein forced her husband to divorce her. In 1986, Shahbandar was married to Saddam Hussein in secret. In the late 1980s, Shahbandar appeared in public with Saddam Hussein.

Kamel Hana Gegeo, Hussein's valet, food taster and friend, introduced Samira to him. Hussein's secret marriage took place while he was married to Sajida Talfah, his first wife and cousin. Sajida was extremely jealous and angry when she found out about his mistress, and her brother Adnan Khairallah complained. Uday Hussein, Saddam Hussein's son with Sajida, was also angry over his father's mistress, took it as an insult to his mother, and believed that his status as heir apparent was threatened. In October 1988, during a party, Uday Hussein murdered Kamel Hana Gegeo in front of horrified guests. While Saddam Hussein declared that Uday would be tried for murder, Gegeo's parents and Sajida begged that Uday be pardoned.

In 2002, Shahbandar's son from her first marriage, Mohammad Saffi, a resident of New Zealand and a flight engineer with Air New Zealand, was detained in Miami, Florida, US due to lack of a student visa where he planned to undergo flight training.

As of 2004, Shahbandar was acknowledged as the wife of Saddam Hussein by the United Nations.

== Depictions ==
Her character was featured heavily in the plot of BBC adaptation of House of Saddam and was played by Australian actress Christine Stephen-Daly. In the drama, Shahbandar is portrayed as a schoolteacher, the occupation of Sajida Talfah.

== Possible issue ==
In a 2007 Al Riyadh interview, Ali Al-Nida Husein Al-Omar, chief of the Bejat subtribe of Al-Bu Nasir, was asked about Saddam's son from Samira Shahbandar. The chief replied:

"Saddam had only two wives, the first was Umm [Mother of] Uday and Qusay, Sajida Khairallah Talfah and the other he married after a while, [was] Samira al-Shahbandar, he married her when she was 40 years old and she had no children from him."

== See also ==
- Sajida Talfah
- House of Saddam
