= Hani Abd Latif Tilfah =

Iraqi security official (born 1962)

Hani Abd Latif Talfah al-Tikriti

Director of the Iraqi Special Security Organization
- In office 2002 – 23 May 2003
- Preceded by: Walid Hamid Tawfiq al-Tikriti

Personal details
- Born: 1962 (age 63–64) Tikrit, Iraq
- Party: Ba'ath Party
- Relations: Rafi (brother); Khairallah (uncle); Subha (aunt); Badra (aunt); Saddam Hussein (cousin)

Hani ibn Abd Latif ibn Talfah (born 1962) (Arabic: هاني عبد اللطيف طلفاح التكريتي) is an Iraqi security official during the rule of Saddam Hussein. He was born in 1962 in Tikrit. Tilfah was the last director of the Special Security Organization of Iraq from 2002 to 2003. He assisted Qusay Hussein and is a relative of Saddam Hussein.

== Career ==
He was the "King of Hearts" in the U.S. deck of most-wanted Iraqi playing cards issued during the war in Iraq. Hani was captured on June 21, 2004.

On 6 June 2011, the Supreme Criminal Court of Iraq acquitted Hani in the case of the 1991 uprisings in Iraq because of insufficient evidence.
