= Saddam Kamel =

Iraqi defector (1960–1996)

Saddam Kamel al-Majid
- صدام كامل حسن المجيد
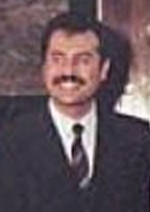

Personal details
- Born: 1 June 1960 Tel Al Thahab, Iraqi Republic
- Died: 23 February 1996 (aged 35) Baghdad, Ba'athist Iraq
- Party: Arab Socialist Ba'ath Party
- Spouse: Rana Hussein
- Parent: Kamel Hassan al-Majid
- Relatives: Hussein (brother); Ali (uncle)

Saddam Kamel Hassan al-Majid (Arabic: صدام كامل حسن المجيد; 1 June 1960 – 23 February 1996) was the first cousin once removed and son-in-law of deposed Iraqi president Saddam Hussein. He was also a part-time actor.

== Biography ==
He was married to Rana Hussein and was the brother of Hussein Kamel al-Majid (who was also married to a daughter of Saddam, Raghad Hussein). He was for a time head of the Republican Guard.

He was removed from the position in 1986 in favour of Saddam Hussein's son, Qusay Hussein, who had then come into majority. Due to his close resemblance to the Iraqi leader, he played the part of Saddam Hussein in the film The Long Days, a propagandistic movie account of Saddam Hussein's early life and rise to power. In 1995, he defected from Iraq with his brother Hussein Kamel al-Majid and their wives. His brother gave information to UNSCOM, the CIA and MI6 about Iraq's weapons of mass destruction.

In 1996, they returned to Iraq believing Saddam's assurances that they had been pardoned for their actions; however, the brothers were killed in a prolonged gun battle with either other members of their clan or soldiers loyal to Saddam shortly after they returned. According to the previous theory, described by Iraqi authorities as the official one, al-Majid and numerous other members of the clan had exercised personal vengeance upon the brothers, possibly as a way by Saddam to circumvent his promise of pardon by masking the executions as a family quarrel.

== See also ==
- House of Saddam
