= Cutting It =

- Cutting It DVD cover for series 4
- Genre: Drama
- Created by: Debbie Horsfield
- Starring: Sarah Parish; Jason Merrells; Angela Griffin; Siân Reeves; Ben Daniels; Amanda Holden; Lucy Gaskell; Cherie Lunghi; Annette Badland; Pearce Quigley; James Murray; Christine Stephen-Daly; Katy Carmichael
- Country of origin: United Kingdom
- Original language: English
- No. of series: 4
- No. of episodes: 25

Production
- Running time: 60 minutes

Original release
- Network: BBC One
- Release: 16 April 2002 – 12 July 2005

Cutting It is a BBC television drama series set in Manchester, England, focusing on the lives and loves of the team running a hairdressing salon. It ran for four series between 2002 and 2005. The show features a number of actors who subsequently became established stars, including Amanda Holden and Ben Daniels.

== Synopsis ==
=== Series 1 ===
In the first series, Alison Henshall, known as Allie, and her husband, Gavin Ferraday, run a hairdressing and beauty salon. Allie's sisters, Darcey and Sydney, are the salon's beautician and nail technician. Allie and Gavin also employ three more staff, hairdresser Shane, junior Ruby and accountant Eugene. Their parents, Brawdie and Tom, complete the regular cast.

Finn Bevan, Allie's ex, and his current wife, Mia, open a rival salon across the road. Allie is upset as she wanted a 2nd Henshall Ferraday salon while Gavin wants to start a family. Allie is reluctant, insisting that she is not maternal and tells Finn that she aborted their baby but later admits that she gave their daughter up for adoption. Ruby reveals that she is Allie and Finn's biological daughter after Allie visits her parents to discuss Ruby's behaviour. Gavin knows that they knew each other years ago and soon realizes the truth about their relationship, as does Mia. Finn makes it clear that he wants Allie back but, despite a one-night stand, she chooses to stay with Gavin until he leaves, needing space. On his return, he insists Ruby tell Allie the truth and she is horrified to learn that Finn is her biological father. Gavin asks Allie to choose and she chooses Finn, leaving with him.

Other secrets that emerge during the series is the truth about Darcey being mixed race. Tom and Brawdie claim that Darcey is a throwback to Brawdie's Jamaican grandmother but when 70s singer, DC Washington, comes for a wedding that Allie and Gavin are doing the hair and beauty for, the truth is revealed. When confronted by Allie, Brawdie insists that she wanted Allie to have a better life and that she had done her a favour. It is soon clear that Brawdie blames her and Tom for wrecking her life. Darcey and Sidney are equally disgusted and despite Brawdie trying to persuade Darcey to introduce herself to DC as his daughter, she refuses, saying that Tom is her father.

A few of Allie and Gavin's friends/colleagues club together to bring a stylist up from London for some expert coaching and Gavin gives his place to Mia, much to Allie's horror. Mia is equally horrified to discover that the stylist is Chantal Morisot, her former boss and the woman she stole Finn from. Chantal is antagonistic to Mia all day and eventually Allie confronts her about it. Chantal apologizes, promises a full refund before leaving. Allie persuades Mia to come for a drink with her, her sisters and Ruby. Sydney tells them that she thinks that she is pregnant, following a brief relationship with Finn, upsetting Mia and Allie, and Allie confides in Mia about the baby she gave up for adoption. Chantal happens to be in the same bar and when she hears Mia tell Allie that Finn will make a great father, she laughs and tells her to ask Finn's other ex-wives, Natalie and Su-Lin, about that. Sydney has a daughter, Calypso, and struggles with motherhood as she insists that Calypso behave as if they were sisters, rather than mother and daughter

=== Series 2 ===
In the second series, Gavin is devastated by Allie leaving and trying to ease the pain, dates many women, including Darcey and Ruby. At her grandfather's 60th birthday party, Ruby reveals that Allie and Finn are her parents and Finn's colourful past, including a criminal record, four ex-wives and two more daughters, Jodie and Layla.

The next day at the salon, Gavin tells Allie that he wants a divorce and offers to buy her half of the salon and house. He renames their salon "Gavin Ferraday" and Allie takes over Mia's salon, renaming it "Allie Henshall". Shane and Darcey join her after Darcey splits from Gavin and feels she cannot work with him. He promotes Ruby and employs Ravi. Ravi does not stay long as he gets a place on a talent show shortlist, despite dating Sydney briefly and proposes to her before leaving for London but she declines, staying in Manchester. Sydney's daughter, Calypso, also takes part in the talent competition and was asked to go to London but Sydney refuses permission as she is too young. Allie and Darcey also found out the identity of Calypso's father.

Allie realizes that she made a mistake leaving Gavin and Shane tells Ruby that its only a matter of time before they get back together. Ruby insists he is wrong as Gavin is with her now and she is pregnant. Eugene gives her a shoulder to cry on and offers to be there for her but she refuses, telling Allie and Gavin about her pregnancy just as they are getting back together. Once Allie recovers from the shock, she asks Gavin to stay with Ruby, which he does. She says nothing about her own pregnancy, assuming Finn is the father, unaware of his vasectomy eleven years ago. The night of Allie and Gavin's one-night stand, Finn slept with Mia. She assumed they would get back together and return to London but Finn let her down gently, telling her that he was with Allie and Manchester was his home now. In revenge, she told him she was late but he told her it was a false alarm and she discovered that Finn had been having an affair with her mother, Zinnia, for years. Determined to hurt Finn, she set fire to both salons (he owned both) and left

=== Series 3 ===
At the beginning of series 3, Finn surprises Allie when he arranges for them to get married in Naples. On their return, Allie tells Ruby who promptly asks Gavin to marry her. Allie's baby isn't due for another few weeks and resents Finn's constant fussing, insisting on organizing Ruby's wedding. Ruby's waters break just as she reaches the altar, halting the wedding as she and Gavin rush to the hospital. Gavin goes home to fetch Ruby's baby bag and gives Allie a lift. Gavin sees something isn't right with Allie and she admits that she is in labour so Gavin delivers her baby, a boy they name Ralfie. Finn helps Ruby deliver her baby at the hospital, a girl they name Artemis.

While on maternity leave, Allie almost misses a photo shoot for a magazine. Not wanting Allie bothered, Finn calls his ex-wife, Chantal, but Allie remembers the photo shoot and arrives at the salon, later joined by Ruby, Gavin and the babies. Chantal is horrified as she thought she was stepping into Mia's shoes. Finn did tell her he and Mia had split but not that he and his new wife had had a baby. On discovering this, Chantal leaves. Family secrets emerge again at Ralfie's christening. The priest, (Finn is Catholic), recognizes Gavin as he taught him at a local school and through him, Ruby gets in touch with Gavin's parents. Allie thought they were dead but after their behaviour at Ralfie's christening, understands why Gavin did not want them around.

Darcey's biological father, singer DC Washington, comes to town for a gig and Darcey leaves a note but does not see him, realizing that Tom is her father because he raised her, unlike DC, who has only just discovered her existence.

Troy, manager of the coffee bar next to the salon, is Mia's half-brother. She has been in therapy for addiction to her ex and decides to visit Finn so she can apologize to him and Allie for her behaviour. Allie sees her first and after doing Mia's hair, leaves Finn a message, warning him she is in Manchester. Finn meets her at a bar with Ralfie but Finn's refusal to admit his vasectomy upsets her and Allie finds Mia and Ralfie sat on the edge of the roof of their apartment building. Finn persuades Mia to give Ralfie to him before slipping from the roof but Finn rescues her. Mia is sectioned and Finn and Allie are warned not to take any notice of anything she said but Troy stays at her bedside. On his return, Troy tells Ruby that he wants a more personal relationship but she refuses. This changes when she finds out Finn is planning to leave Allie and baby Ralfie and has a go at him for being selfish and unreliable. He lets it slip that Gavin is, in fact, Ralfie's father. Ruby is horrified and realizes she made a mistake when she got together with Gavin and leaves with Artemis.

=== Series 4 ===
Series 4 starts with Allie's parents remarrying; Allie and Gavin are back in business together and are even starting their own hairdressing academy. They are considering getting married and Allie thinks she is pregnant but later discovers that she has ovarian cancer. Allie is told she needs a hysterectomy and chemotherapy. Allie and Darcey keep this secret but Sydney finds the pregnancy test and thinking Allie is going to have an abortion, tells Gavin. He rushes after her and Darcey tells him the truth.

Liam (James Murray) is an investor in the Henshall Ferraday hairdressing academy. He was once part of a boy band called Gimme 5, now retired from show business and looking for a new interest. He takes a shine to the woman hired as teacher for the academy, Melissa Devereux (Christine Stephen-Daly). Unfortunately, she needs some persuading to take the job as she and Gavin had a fling while he was in Australia in series 1. He returned to the UK, leaving her to get married but things did not work out and she came to the UK.

At one hospital appointment, Allie is told that she is not responding to the chemo and considers stopping. Worried she does not have long to live, she organizes a secret wedding for her and Gavin. Just after the ceremony, she has another appointment at the hospital. Shocked by the doctor's news, Allie does not look where she is going on leaving and is killed in a car crash. Gavin tries to replace Allie with Melissa but she realizes it is too soon for Gavin to move on and dumps him.

During series 3, Darcey realized she was developing romantic feelings for Eugene and he felt the same so they started seeing each other. When Darcey started spending time with Troy, Eugene was worried until Darcey told him she was not having an affair because she is pregnant with his baby. The series ended with Gavin's decision to go travelling with Ralfie and gave Darcey control of the business.

== Characters ==
Sarah Parish as Allie Henshall: A very strong and determined character in her mid-thirties often having moments of weakness because of unfulfilled dreams. Allie is the first-born child in her family, the oldest of three sisters. She constantly seeks her mother's love and approval, despite Brawdie's constant put downs and insults. Allie was an idealistic and sweet young girl until her heart was broken in Italy by the man she loved when she found she was pregnant and her mother bullied her to give the baby up for adoption. Allie went to college to learn hair styling and met Gavin Ferraday three years later; after a five-year romance, she and Gavin married and started their hair salon. They had been running it for ten years by the start of the first series. Allie has ambition and intentions of achieving something greater in life and, due to her tragic past, she has no desire to have children.

Jason Merrells as Gavin Ferraday: Described by most of his friends and colleagues as 'the most sorted man on the planet'. Gavin is confident, straightforward, good-looking and kind-hearted. Gavin's business-mindedness and expertise is what has brought the Henshall-Ferraday salon to award winning status (much to his wife Allie's resentment) through the countless celebrities he has brought in and the trophies and honours he has won. Although he is ambitious and determined like his wife, he feels he has conquered almost everything in the world of hairdressing, and wants to settle down and raise a family.

Siân Reeves as Sydney "Syd" Henshall: Syd is in her early thirties and nail technician at the Henshall-Ferraday Salon; she stands out with eccentric dress sense and impractical hairstyles. She is prone to fads ranging from diet and exercise, retro-religious lifestyle and modern trends. Syd focuses on romance and tends to fall in love with handsome but sometimes unobtainable men. Although mother of a teenage daughter, she enjoys the single lifestyle with clubbing and drinking; Syd's maternal instincts are mixed with healthy jealousy of her beautiful youthful daughter and the responsibility of making sure her daughter is wearing catwalk designer labels. Syd tries to come off as classy and poised but often slips into her more common persona. In the second series we discover Syd almost became a pop star through a talent show - she has a second chance to take the leap but falls back.

Angela Griffin as Darcey Henshall: Darcey is the youngest of the Henshall sisters and is the beautician and massage therapist at the salon. While putting on a hard face, she is mixed up about what she wants from life but has had a tendency to become involved with wealthy married men as she has no real desire to settle down. She often finds wealthy married men to pay her living expenses, often relying on jeweller Smedley, a long-time boyfriend who is married to the salon's publicist. Darcey comes across as a snob, frequently turning her nose up at anything Smedley gives her and expressing disdain for her mother's slovenly appearance. Darcey has had numerous cosmetic surgeries to fix her shortcomings, paid for by various boyfriends. Darcey had been misled to believe she was mixed race due to a recessive gene through a Jamaican ancestor and is disturbed by the revelation that her real father is DC Washington. Despite the revelation about her true parentage, Darcey insists that Tom Henshall as her real father.

Annette Badland as Brawdie Henshall: Brawdie was once a pretty and lively woman who accidentally got pregnant by Tom, a man she was seeing but had never cared that much for. She always felt that Allie was responsible for trapping her into marriage to Tom and struggles to feel anything other than resentment for Allie. An overweight, lazy, and depressed individual, she spends her time sitting in a messy house wearing leggings and ill-fitting T-shirts complaining about her family in great detail.

Bill Thomas as Tom Henshall: Tom is an understanding, idealistic, and upbeat man who has immense pride in and adoration for his daughters, especially Allie who he recognises needs him more than Syd and Darcey, due to her mother's neglect and failure to accept her. Despite his wife's disregard for him, Tom is deeply in love with Brawdie and has been ever since the beginning of their relationship. Tom knew about Brawdie's one-night stand that resulted in Darcey's conception but his love for his wife gave him the ability to forgive her and to parent the child that resulted from that union. Tom thinks of Darcey as his daughter as he brought her up and loved her as his own. Tom spends a great deal of time fretting over his relationship with Brawdie and goes out of his way to show her he truly loves her even if it is not reciprocated.

Rebecca Bellamy as Calypso Henshall: Regardless of her mother Syd's constant reiteration to behave in a classy and dignified manner, Calypso often behaves as a typical and occasionally whiny British teenager. In the second series, Calypso has an opportunity to participate in a talent show, but her mother refuses her the chance to go to London to attend. Calypso occasionally resents her mother as she is made to refer to her in public as her "sister".

Lucy Gaskell as Ruby Ferris: Ruby grew up the only girl in a house of seven brothers; she and her siblings were all adopted. Ruby is an intelligent, fast thinking and occasionally scheming young lady; she often has a knack for being too brazen when it is uncalled for and runs her mouth without considering consequences, often leading her to various reprimands at work. She works at the Henshall-Ferraday salon as a junior stylist and has done for just under two years. Near the end of Series 1 it is revealed Ruby is Allie's biological daughter (given up at birth) and that she had intentionally applied for a job at the salon at age sixteen so she could get to know 'the woman who had given her up'. Ruby's adoptive parents are open-minded individuals, her mother suffers with multiple sclerosis and her father grows cannabis in the attic to help tackle his wife's pain. Ruby's first serious relationship is with Eugene Eubank, the salon's accountant and reveals that she was a virgin until then.

James Midgley as Shane Ince: Shane is an outwardly gay man who works as a senior stylist in the salon; he has a reputation for being catty, and often gets himself into trouble with the wrong people. He takes great delight in beating Syd to various men and they often find themselves competing for the same guys. Shane is closer to Ruby than the rest of the salon staff but does not take friendship or loyalty at all seriously and will easily overturn either in favour of money.

Pearce Quigley as Eugene Eubank: The salon's resident accountant, and close friend of both Allie and Gavin, Eugene lives above the salon in a flat filled with football memorabilia. Eugene has always been deeply in love with Allie. Regardless of the unreturned feelings, it was Eugene who had to help Allie pick up the pieces when she returned from Italy pregnant and dumped. Later, Eugene became the best friend of Allie's husband Gavin, and while not being particularly brave, will set out to protect Allie from anyone who tries to hurt her - especially Finn. Eugene is obsessed with football, especially "Man City" and is often the brunt of jokes in the salon. He unintentionally falls into a relationship with Ruby and later reveals that he was a virgin up until their union.

Ben Daniels as Finn Bevan: An opportunist and a sex addict, Finn is always confident in his approach to what he wants, and never falters in getting it. He shared a passionate romantic relationship with Allie when she was just seventeen years old; when Allie became pregnant, he withdrew from the relationship, reluctant to give up the backpacking trip he had been planning for a year. Finn has been married four times already, and has two 'unwanted' children with two of his wives. A self-made man upon his return to Manchester, he is incredibly wealthy and owns two bars with a third called Byzantium opening upon the start of Series 1. He intends to win the already married Allie back, even if it means dropping his beautiful and infatuated wife, Mia. Finn reveals that although he has been a womanizer during his life, that Allie was the face behind every woman he had ever been with as he tried desperately to forget her.

Amanda Holden as Mia Bevan: Mia forces herself forward as a confident and sickly sweet young woman in her late twenties (although speculation was made that she may have lied about her age). Mia was a mousy and shy assistant stylist for Finn's third wife Chantalle who had spent most of the time belittling her and trying to convince her to give hairdressing up as she had no style and vision. Shortly after, Mia began sleeping with Finn and later Finn divorced Chantalle to be with Mia. Finn helped Mia to become more confident and opportunist, elegant and charming. Mia is fully aware of Finn's tendency to "play away from home", but overlooks it convinced that he will always return home to her; she refers to him as being like a child who needs constant attention and variety which she cannot always be bothered to give him. Mia is sharp and scheming and when her husband opens "Blade Runners" for her, she uses every trick she can to try to bring Allie's salon down as revenge for her affair with Finn.

== German remake ==
A re-make of the series called Bis in die Spitzen was broadcast by Sat. 1 in Germany in 2005 and 2006. The re-make was set in Berlin and ran for 13 episodes (which included the storylines of the original seasons one and two). Despite critical acclaim, viewing figures were lower than expected and so was axed by the channel after just one series. A four-disc DVD box-set was released on 24 March 2006.
