= Christine Stephen-Daly =

Australian actress

- Born: 5 December 1972 (age 53); Melbourne, Australia
- Television: Casualty; Cutting It; The Bill; Pacific Drive

Christine Stephen-Daly (born 1972) is an Australian actress. Her television credits include Pacific Drive (1996), Casualty (2001–04), Cutting It (2005), and House of Saddam (2008).

== Early life ==
Stephen-Daly grew up in Melbourne with her father Paul, an entrepreneur and owner of a restaurant; mother Rhonnda, a housewife; and three sisters. Her father is of Hungarian ancestry.

== Career ==
Stephen-Daly's first role was as Amber Kingsley in Pacific Drive. She made guest appearances in a number of other Australian television shows including Blue Heelers, Big Sky, All Saints, Water Rats, Murder Call, Wildside, Farscape, Stingers and Something in the Air.

She then went to the United Kingdom in September 2000 to have a break from acting in Australia. She made a guest appearance in EastEnders before landing the role as Lara Stone in the BBC One medical drama Casualty, a role she played for three years. She then went on to appear in Cutting It. Stephen-Daly also appeared in The Bill, and as Samira Shahbandar, Saddam Hussein's second wife in the BBC drama House of Saddam, as well as popular children's CBBC science fiction series, The Sarah Jane Adventures.

She appeared in Australia soap opera Neighbours in 2022 for 5 episodes.

== Filmography ==
=== Film ===
Year	Title	Role	Type
1996	Love and Other Catastrophes	Susan	Feature film
1996	Black Sun		Short film
1998	Crimes of Fashion		Short film
1999	Me Myself I	Deirdre	Feature film
1999	Change of Heart	Julie Sinclair	Feature film

=== Television ===
Year	Title	Role	Type
1994	Blue Heelers	Jilly Miles	TV series, S2E42: "The First Stone"
1995	Janus	Gilda	TV series, S2E5: "My Learned Friend, Mr Hennessey"
1996	The Genie from Down Under	Woman Tourist	TV series, S1E13: "It's Still Magic"
1996	Pacific Drive	Amber Kingsley	TV series, S1, 11 episodes
1997	Big Sky	Simone MacIntosh	TV series, S1E36: "The Choice"
1998	All Saints	Rachel McMahon	TV series, S1E6: "Give and Take"
1998	Water Rats	Sylvia Rapsardi	TV series, S3E11: "Run for the Money"
1998	Murder Call	Sonia Cameron	TV series, S2E15: "Cry Wolf"
1999	Wildside	Vicky Clark	TV series, S2E8
1999	Stingers	Christina Brock	TV series, S1, 5 episodes
1999–2000	Farscape	Lieutenant Fenra Teeg	TV series, S1, 3 episodes
2000	Something in the Air	Stephanie Bennett	TV series, S1, 4 episodes
2001	EastEnders	Celine	TV series, 1 episode
2002	Holby City	Dr. Lara Stone	TV series, S4E2
2003	Children in Need	Dr. Lara Stone	
2001–04	Casualty	Lara Stone	TV series, S16–18, 116 episodes
2005	Cutting It	Melissa Devereaux	TV series, S4, 6 episodes
2006–07	The Bill	Kristen Shaw	TV series, S22–23, 20 episodes
2008	Love Soup	Kirsty	TV series, S2E11: "Human Error"
2008	House of Saddam	Samira Shahbandar	TV docudrama miniseries, 3 episodes
2011	The Sarah Jane Adventures	Miss Myers	TV series, S5E1–2: "Sky"
2012	Emmerdale	Barrister Fisher	TV series, 5 episodes
2013	Jo	Mirabelle Montaigne	TV miniseries, 1 episode
2018	Doctors	Lou Marwood	TV series, S19, 4 episodes
2022	Neighbours	Danielle Pendlebury	TV series, 5 episodes

=== Radio ===
Year	Title	Role	Type
2019	Prime Cut	Tess Maguire	BBC Radio 4

== Theatre ==
Year	Title	Role	Type
1992	Here Comes a Chopper		NIDA
1992	The Seagull	Nina Mikhailovna Zarechniy	NIDA
1992	Cymbeline	Arviragus	NIDA
1992	That's Amore!		NIDA
1993	Bobbin’ Up		NIDA
1993	Road		NIDA
1993	Anna Karenina	Agatha / Princess Betsy / Peasant	NIDA
1993	Miss Julie	Miss Julie	NIDA
1993	A Midsummer Night’s Dream	Philostrate	NIDA
1994	Desire		Crossroads Theatre, Sydney
1997	Blinded by the Sun	Joanna	Ensemble Theatre
1998	The Sunshine Boys	All female roles	Ensemble Theatre
2000	Face to Face	Julie Sinclair	Malthouse Theatre, Melbourne with Playbox Theatre Company
2006	The Blue Room	All female roles	Theatre Royal, UK
2007	A Conversation	Loren Zamenac	Royal Exchange, Manchester
