= Iraqi Special Security Organization =

Government agency under Saddam Hussein

- الأمن الخاص; Al-Amn al-Khas

Agency overview
- Formed: 1973
- Dissolved: 2003
- Jurisdiction: Government of Iraq
- Headquarters: Baghdad, Iraq
- Employees: 5,000
- Agency executive: Hani Abd Latif Tilfah al-Tikriti (2002–2003), Director
- Parent agency: Independent

The Iraqi Special Security Organization (SSO; Arabic: الأمن الخاص, Al-Amn al-Khas) was the most powerful Iraqi security agency under President Saddam Hussein and was responsible for personal security of high-ranking government officials and presidential facilities. This agency, in an effort to provide security to the regime and assure quality control throughout the intelligence directorates, had the authority to carry out abduction, murder, and intimidation. All was done on direct orders from the Hussein leadership. Its director, Hani Abd Al-Latif Tilfah Al-Tikriti was the seventh most wanted Iraqi government individual by the United States. He was the highest-ranking unpictured person in the U.S. Army most-wanted Iraqi playing cards (the king of hearts). He was captured in June 2004.

SSO was officially dissolved on 23 May 2003 per Order Number 2 of the Coalition Provisional Authority under Administrator L. Paul Bremer.

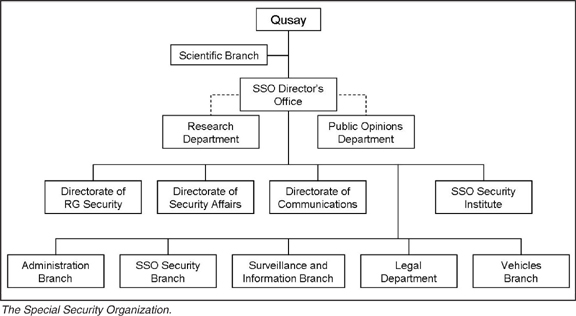
SSO organization

== Directors ==
According to the Iraq Survey Group Final Report:

- Hussein Kamel al-Majid (1983–1989)
- Fannar Zibin al-Hassan (Gulf War)
- Qusay Hussein (4 July 1992 – 6 January 1997)
- Nawfal Mahjoom al-Tikriti (6 January 1997 – ?)
- Qusay Hussein (?–2001)
- Walid Hamid Tawfiq al-Tikriti (2001–2002)
- Hani Abd Latif Tilfah al-Tikriti (2002–2003)

== See also ==
- Law enforcement in Iraq
- Directorate of General Security – Former internal Iraqi security agency
- Iraqi Intelligence Service – Former external Iraqi security agency
