= Rafi Abd Latif Tilfah =

Iraqi official

Rafi Abd Latif Talfah al-Tikriti
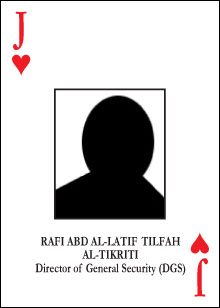
- Most-wanted Iraqi playing card of Rafi

Director of the General Security
- In office 1999–2003

Personal details
- Born: 1954 (age 71–72) Tikrit, Iraq
- Party: Ba'ath Party
- Relations: Hani (brother); Khairallah (uncle); Subha (aunt); Badra (aunt); Saddam Hussein (cousin)

Rafi ibn Abd al-Latif ibn Talfah (Arabic: رافع عبد اللطيف طلفاح التكريتي; born in 1954 in Tikrit) is the last head of the Iraqi Directorate of General Security secret police force at the end of President Saddam Hussein's reign. A maternal cousin of Saddam, Rafi went into hiding during the Iraq War, when a United States-led Coalition invaded the country and overthrew Saddam Hussein's government. A key aide to General al-Douri, Rafi al-Tikriti provided information and actionable intelligence on anti-regime individuals and opposition groups in each governorate of Iraq, particularly Kurdish, Iranian, and Turkmen.

== Career ==
Rafi was the "jack of hearts" in the US deck of most-wanted Iraqi playing cards during the Iraq War. As of 2025, he is still at large.

In 2018, Iraqi authorities published a list of the 60 most-wanted people, among them Rafi.
