= Khairallah Talfah =

Iraqi military officer and politician (c. 1910–1993)

- خير الله طلفاح
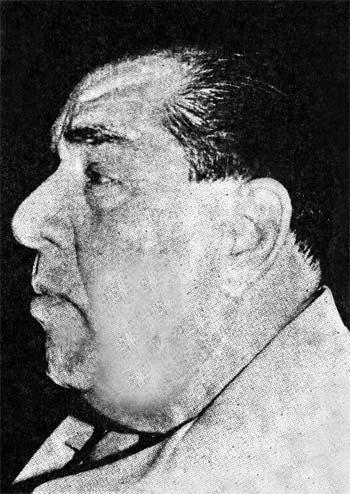

Governor of Baghdad
- In office 1979–1981

Personal details
- Born: c. 1910 Al-Awja, Baghdad Vilayet, Ottoman Empire
- Died: 20 April 1993 (aged 83–84) Baghdad, Ba'athist Iraq
- Party: Arab Socialist Ba'ath Party
- Other political affiliations: Iraqi Independence Party (1946–1956)
- Spouses: Lilo Wahib; Khawla Abd al-Baqi; Fatima Hassan al-Majid
- Children: 12: With Lilo; Sajida; Adnan; With Khawla; Ahlam; Ilham; With Fatima; Lo'uay; Maan; Mudar; Kahlan; Ghaidan; Khansa
- Relatives: Saddam (nephew and son-in-law); Barzan (nephew and son-in-law); Watban (nephew); Sabawi (nephew); Hani (nephew); Rafi (nephew)
- Published works: Three Whom God Should Not Have Created: Persians, Jews, and Flies (1940)

Military service
- Allegiance: Kingdom of Iraq; Arab Federation; Republic of Iraq
- Branch/service: Royal Iraqi Army
- Years of service: 1931–1966
- Rank: Brigadier
- Unit: 2nd Signals Battalion
- Battles/wars: Anglo-Iraqi War

Khairallah Talfah (Note: Also rendered as Khayr-Allah Telfah, Kairallah Tolfah, or Khairallah Tolfah.) (Arabic: خير الله طلفاح Khayr Allāh Ṭilfāḥ; 1910 – 20 April 1993) was an Iraqi military officer, politician, and author. He was the maternal uncle and father-in-law of Saddam Hussein. He was the father of Saddam's first wife Sajida Talfah and of Iraqi defense minister Adnan Khairallah. Under the Saddam regime, Talfah served as governor of Baghdad from 1979 to 1981, when he was removed from his position on charges of corruption.

Born in the village of Al-Awja near Tikrit, many of Talfah's family members were Arab nationalists who opposed the Ottoman Empire. Talfah himself would also adopt the ideology against British rule in Iraq, eventually participating in the 1941 coup d'état, which brought the anti-British Rashid Ali al-Gaylani to power with aid from Nazi Germany and Fascist Italy. However, the British quickly suppressed al-Gaylani's government in the ensuing Anglo-Iraqi War, leading to Talfah's imprisonment. Following his release, his anti-British political activities continued, and he played a role in the founding of the Arab nationalist Iraqi Independence Party in 1946, though it was dissolved a decade later. Talfah's career as a politician would not particularly grow in notability until the Arab Socialist Ba'ath Party took control of Iraq through the 1968 coup d'état.

Under Saddam's regime, Talfah reportedly spent most of his tenure as Baghdad's governor conducting morality policing against Iraqi citizens, particularly women, who were seen as adopting "Westernized" clothing styles. These actions, along with his mishandling of government funds and other resources, contributed to the removal of Talfah from his position by Saddam two years after his appointment.

Talfah authored a pamphlet titled Three Whom God Should Not Have Created: Persians, Jews, and Flies in 1940. The work, which overtly expresses anti-Persian sentiment and antisemitism, has been described by British journalist Con Coughlin as a "weak Iraqi attempt at imitating Mein Kampf" and is believed to have had an influence on Saddam's policies, owing to the Arabization campaigns in northern Iraq and the Iran–Iraq War.

== Early life and military career ==
Khairallah was born in 1910 in the village of Al-Awja, 5 km south of Tikrit, and then part of the Baghdad Vilayet of the Ottoman Empire. He was grandson of Musalat ibn Omar Bey III, al-Bu Nasir tribal leader and martyr of the anti-Ottoman resistance.

Khairallah, a teacher and an Arab nationalist, was a member of the al-Jawwal society and later participated as an Iraqi Army Officer in the Army revolt of 1941 led by Rashid 'Ali Al-Gaylani against the Iraqi Royal institution supported by the occupying British forces. The revolt did not achieve any major changes, with the British dispatching a taskforce which occupied the country and re-installed the ousted pro-British Regent 'Abd al-Ilah. Many Iraqi soldiers who had participated in the revolt were pardoned, largely keeping their ranks and military position. Khairallah was expelled from the army and spent six years in prison for his part in the revolt.

He would later play a role in the founding of the anti-British and Arab nationalist Iraqi Independence Party. He was released from prison in 1947. Following his release, he returned to Tikrit, where his nephew Saddam Hussein moved back in with him and began school. Saddam had previously lived with Khairallah prior to the 1941 coup and subsequent war, but had moved back in with his parents during Khairallah's imprisonment. Unlike Khairallah, Saddam's mother and step-father beat him and prevented him from receiving an education.

== Political career ==
He became the Governor of Baghdad in 1958, he became a member of the Higher Education and Scientific Research Council in 1972, and he served as head of the Civil Service Board from 1973 to 1982.

He became President of the Association of Veteran Warriors جمعية المحاربين القدماء after the Baath party seized power in 1968.

He collected a considerable amount of wealth by using his influence as a close relative of both Ahmed Hassan al-Bakr and Saddam Hussein. He formed a retail and property organization which was widely known as the Khairallah Talfah Society (Arabic: جمعية خير الله طلفاح) . One of the society's greatest money generating schemes was buying worthless farmland on the outskirts of cities where residential land was in very short supply, dividing the farmland into thousands of residential plots, then selling the plots to people and making high profits as a result, the plots were usually sold to members of the military, police officers, teachers, and other government workers.

He headed the War Veterans Society (Veteran Warriors or the Khairallah Talfah Society, جمعية خير الله طلفاح as it was commonly named). With the huge shortages of almost all consumer goods that became the new phenomena soon after the Baath Party took power on 17 July 1968, the Khairallah Talfah Society جمعية خير الله طلفاح imported goods at dinar/dollar rates which were heavily subsidized and then it made a considerable profit by selling these same goods to very grateful people.

=== Saddam's regime and death ===
When he became Mayor of Baghdad in the early 1970s, he neglected to perform his other duties because he preoccupied himself by imposing his personal standards of "morality" and "righteous behaviour on other people". He ordered the security service and the police force to spray paint the legs of any woman who was caught wearing short skirts, and he also ordered them to tear the bell-bottom trousers which were worn by all males and females. These trousers were fashionable at the time. These actions against any "Westernised" contemporary trends only lasted a few weeks because they were abruptly terminated, probably when Vice President Saddam Hussein intervened. These "trendy" fashions subsequently spread all over the country and they were even indulged in by Khairallah's own sons and daughters.

== Personal life and family ==
His sons and daughters were known to behave like miniatures of their father. It was alleged that they could be quite unpleasant to people, expecting others to show obedience, deference and acknowledge their superiority.

His daughter Ilham (born 1955 and later died of cancer) was schooled in the Christian convent girls' school of Rahibat Al-Taqdomah. Ilham was the half-sister of Sajida (Saddam's wife) and Adnan Khairallah (Defence Minister).

The daughters of President Ahmed Hassan al-Bakr were in that school before Ilham. Al-Bakr's daughters were known to have been very well behaved, mingling seamlessly with all others and not showing any of the superiority and arrogance that became the usual behaviour of Khairallah Talfah's daughter Ilham. It is reported that Ilham disagreed with a Kurd girl's opinion in a religious education lesson; then the secret service, sent by her father Khairallah the next morning, arrested the young girl who was then reportedly released after a few days but never joined the school again. Ilham was reportedly saying that she had to get her arrested to teach her and any other person who dares to "behave inappropriately" a good lesson.

Ilham married Ahmed Hassan al-Bakr's son, only to divorce from him as soon as Saddam took power from al-Bakr, allegedly through the influence of her father Khairallah. Ilham then married Watban, Saddam's half brother.

Khairallah Talfah's son Lou'ay was shot with a hand gun in 1983 while in the resort of Habbaniya. The bullet fractured his femur and an emergency surgery to fix the fracture with a plate and screws was performed in Rasheed Military Hospital in Baghdad on the same night. He made a full recovery after a few weeks' stay in Rasheed Military Hospital Officers' Fracture ward. The surgery was performed by Major General Doctor Moflih Al-Dulaimi who happened to have been on-on call that night. The circumstances of the shooting were not clear, but he claimed that it had been an accidental shooting while cleaning the gun. However, no gunpowder wounds were reported to have been seen on the entry wound by the surgeons. This means that the gun was unlikely to have been fired within 90 cm of the injured, and therefore, it could not have been self-inflicted.

Shortly before his death, Talfah's legs were amputated because he was suffering from diabetes.

=== Relatives ===
He had strong family ties with the highest Iraqi power figures:

- He was Ali Hassan al-Majid's brother-in-law (Khairallah was married to Ali's sister Fatima).
- His daughter Ilham married Haytham (Al-Bakr's eldest son), only to divorce when Al-Bakr lost power to Saddam Hussein then married Watban (Saddam's half brother).
- He was Saddam Hussein's uncle (Saddam's mother was his sister Sabha). Saddam was raised by Tulfah for several years, and he reportedly idolized his uncle.
- He was Saddam's father-in-law (Saddam Hussein was married to Khairiallah's daughter, Sajida).

== Published works and controversy ==
In 1940, Talfah wrote a pamphlet, Three Whom God Should Not Have Created: Persians, Jews, and Flies (Arabic: ثلاثة كان على الله ان لايخلقهم: الفرس، اليهود والذباب), in which he describes Persian people as "animals that God created in human form" and Jewish people as "a mixture of dirt and diverse remnants of people." According to British author Con Coughlin, "This weak Iraqi attempt at imitating Mein Kampf had an impact on Saddam's future policies." His views notwithstanding, it is claimed that Talfah played an important role in saving Jews from detention under Saddam's regime, although more than 75% of Iraq's Jewish population had been evacuated to Israel well before Saddam's rise to power in 1979.

== See also ==
- Family of Saddam Hussein
