= Killing of Qusay and Uday Hussein =

2003 US military operation in the Iraq war

- Part of the Iraq War
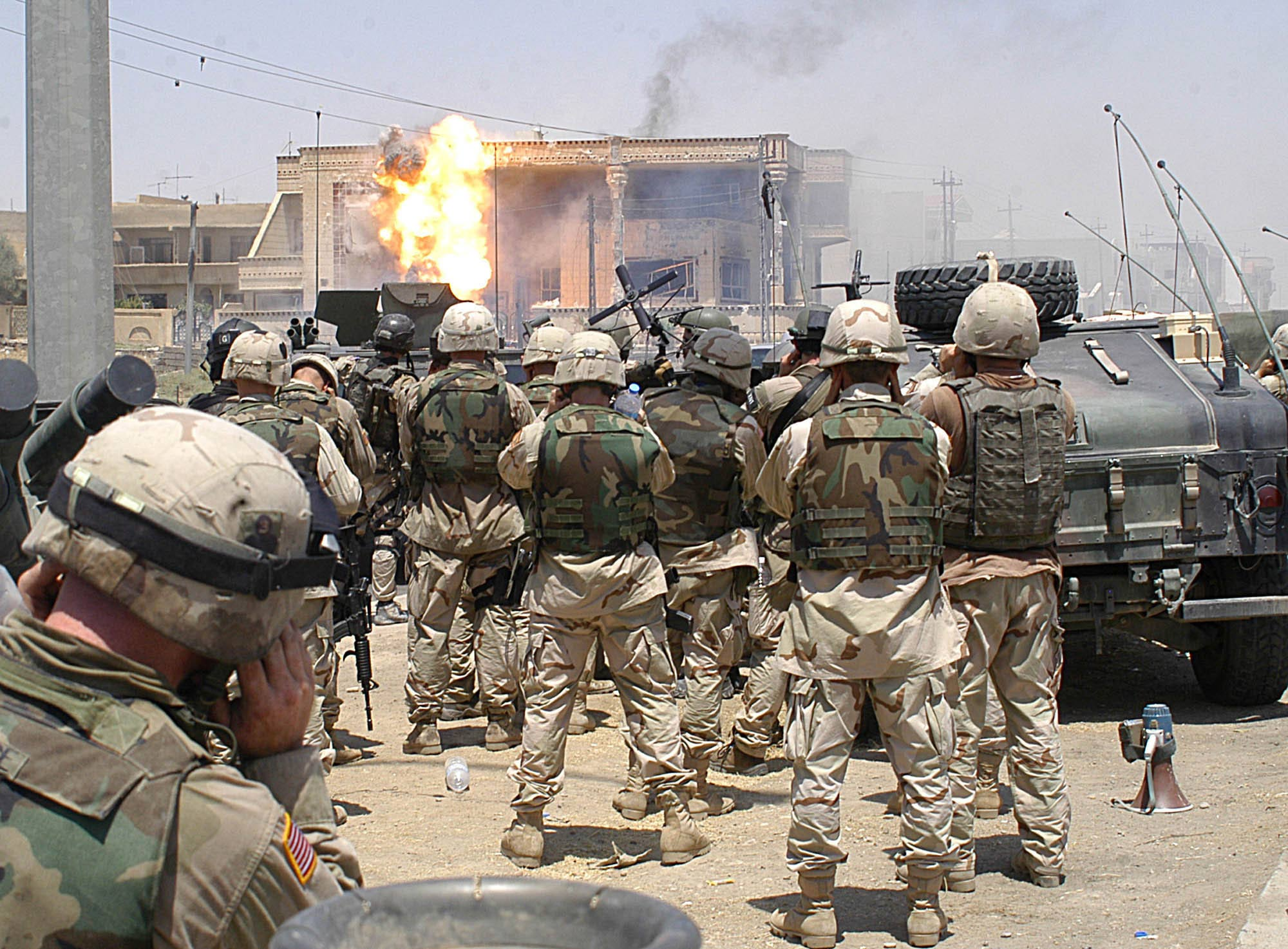
- US soldiers watch as a TOW missile strikes the side of Qusay and Uday Hussein's Mosul hideout during the raid.
Date	22 July 2003
Location	Northern Al-Falah suburb of Mosul, Iraq 36°23′26″N 43°10′56″E
Result	Uday and Qusay Hussein killed

Belligerents
(Iraq) Ba'athist Insurgents	United States

Commanders and leaders
(Iraq) Uday Hussein † (Iraq) Qusay Hussein †	(United States) Frank Helmick (United States) Ricardo Sanchez

Units involved
None	U.S. Special Forces; 101st Airborne Division; Task Force 121; Task Force 20

Strength
4 (Uday, Qusay, Mustafa, Abdul Samad al-Hadushi)	240+ soldiers 8 special forces personnel 10+ Humvees; Several Kiowa OH-58D helicopters

Casualties and losses
4 killed	4 wounded, 2 Belgian Malinois combat dogs killed

Uday and Qusay Hussein, sons of deposed Iraqi president Saddam Hussein, were killed during an American military operation conducted on 22 July 2003, in the city of Mosul, Iraq. The operation originally intended to apprehend them but turned into a four-hour gun battle outside a fortified safehouse which ended with the death of the brothers, Qusay's son Mustafa Hussein and a bodyguard, Abdul Samad al-Hadushi.

== Background ==
In March 2003, a military coalition led by the United States invaded Iraq and overthrew the country's Ba'athist regime under Saddam Hussein. Following the defeat of the Iraqi Army, Saddam and his sons, Uday Hussein and Qusay Hussein went into hiding and became fugitives wanted by the occupying Coalition forces. Uday had been the founder and commander of the Fedayeen Saddam, a loyalist paramilitary organization that served as Saddam Hussein's personal guard, while Qusay had been a high-ranking member of the Iraqi Republican Guard.

Qusay and Uday Hussein were the ace of hearts and ace of clubs, respectively, in the Coalition's most-wanted Iraqi playing cards. Saddam himself was the ace of spades. A combined $30,000,000 reward for the brothers' capture was posted by Coalition authorities.

== Assault ==
On the night of Monday 21 July 2003, Nawaf al-Zaidan, a businessman and close friend of Saddam's family (and also being a part of a family known for falsely claiming to be 'cousins' of Saddam's family, rather being from the same tribe) who had been sheltering Uday, Qusay, Qusay's 14-year-old son Mustafa Hussein and their bodyguard Abdul-Samad in his mansion in the Falah neighbourhood of northeastern Mosul for around three weeks, left the villa and went to a nearby US Coalition 101st Airborne base to turn in the two sons due to the combined $30 million reward. "He was nervous, I could tell, more nervous than anybody else I've seen dealing with it. Yet he had confidence in what he said. More than most of the other people," the American military intelligence sergeant who interviewed al-Zaidan told 60 Minutes II. "He had exact locations. He also could tell very good descriptions on Qusay and Uday as well, their habits. He told me what exactly they looked like." Al-Zaidan then passed a lie detector test. A decision was made to send a detachment of U.S. Special Forces troops to apprehend the brothers.

At about 10:00 AM on Tuesday July 22, 2003, eight Special Forces soldiers from Task Force 121, accompanied by 40 infantrymen from the 101st Airborne Division, surrounded the safehouse. A bullhorn was used to order the house's occupants to come out and surrender, but there was no response.

Ten minutes later, a team of eight U.S. Special Forces operatives knocked on the door of the house. When no one answered, the soldiers breached the door and entered the house. Inside, the team came under heavy gunfire from the house's defenders, who were armed with AK-47s and had barricaded themselves on the building's second floor. In the ensuing gun battle, three Special Forces soldiers were wounded inside the house. As the entry team attempted to withdraw, the occupants began shooting out the windows, wounding a fourth soldier. The four wounded operatives were evacuated by helicopter as the team retreated from the building and called for backup.

After the Special Forces team retreated from the house, soldiers from the 101st Airborne Division's 3/327th Infantry surrounded the safehouse and opened fire with Mk 19 grenade launchers, AT4 anti-tank weapons, and Humvee-mounted .50-caliber M2 Browning machine guns, and an intense gun battle ensued. By 11:22 AM, over an hour into the firefight, more than 200 reinforcement soldiers had arrived to assist the task force.

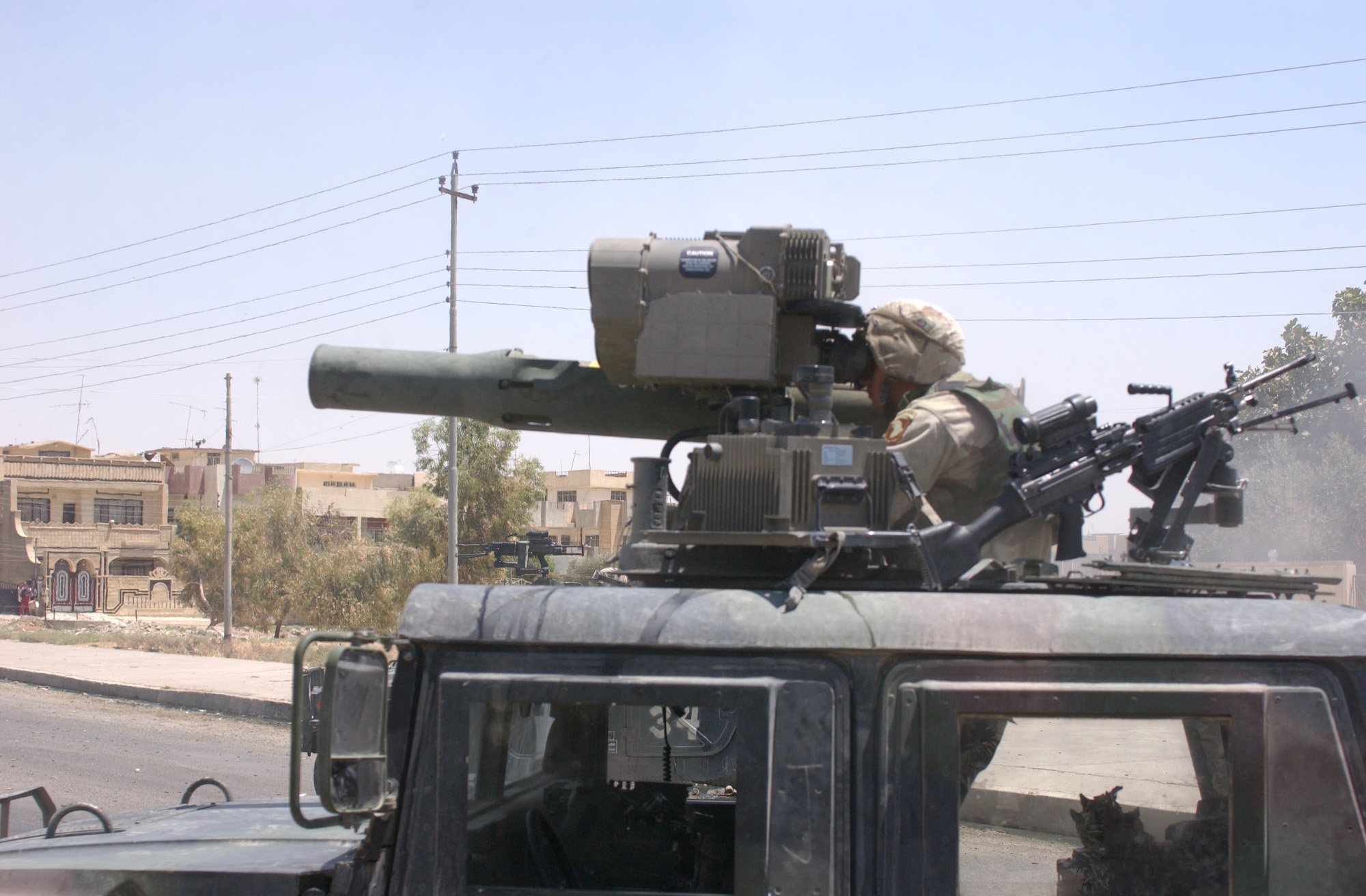
A soldier from the 101st Airborne Division looks through a Humvee-mounted TOW launcher at the safehouse where Qusay and Uday Hussein barricaded themselves.

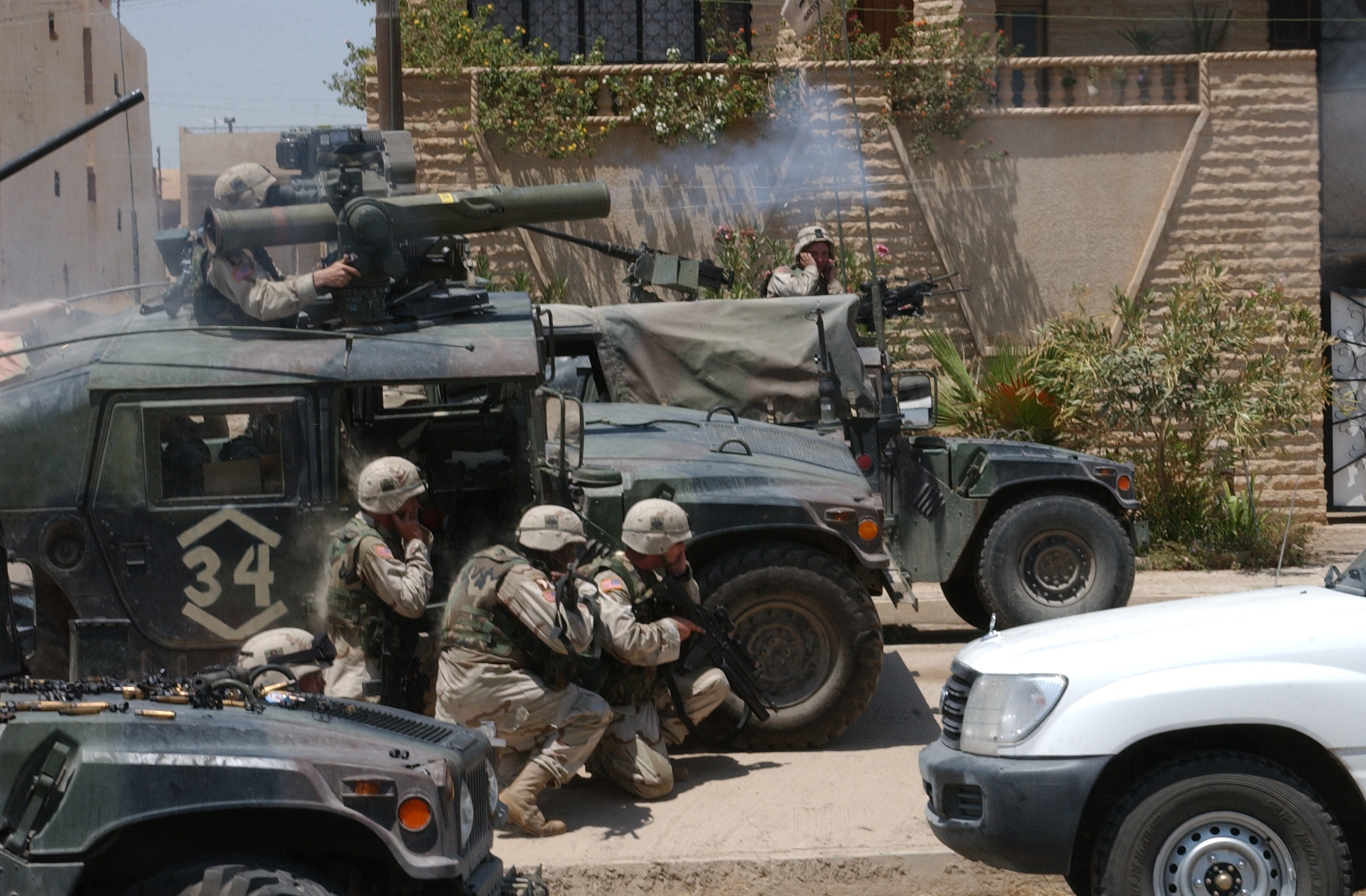
U.S. soldiers fire on the safehouse during the raid.

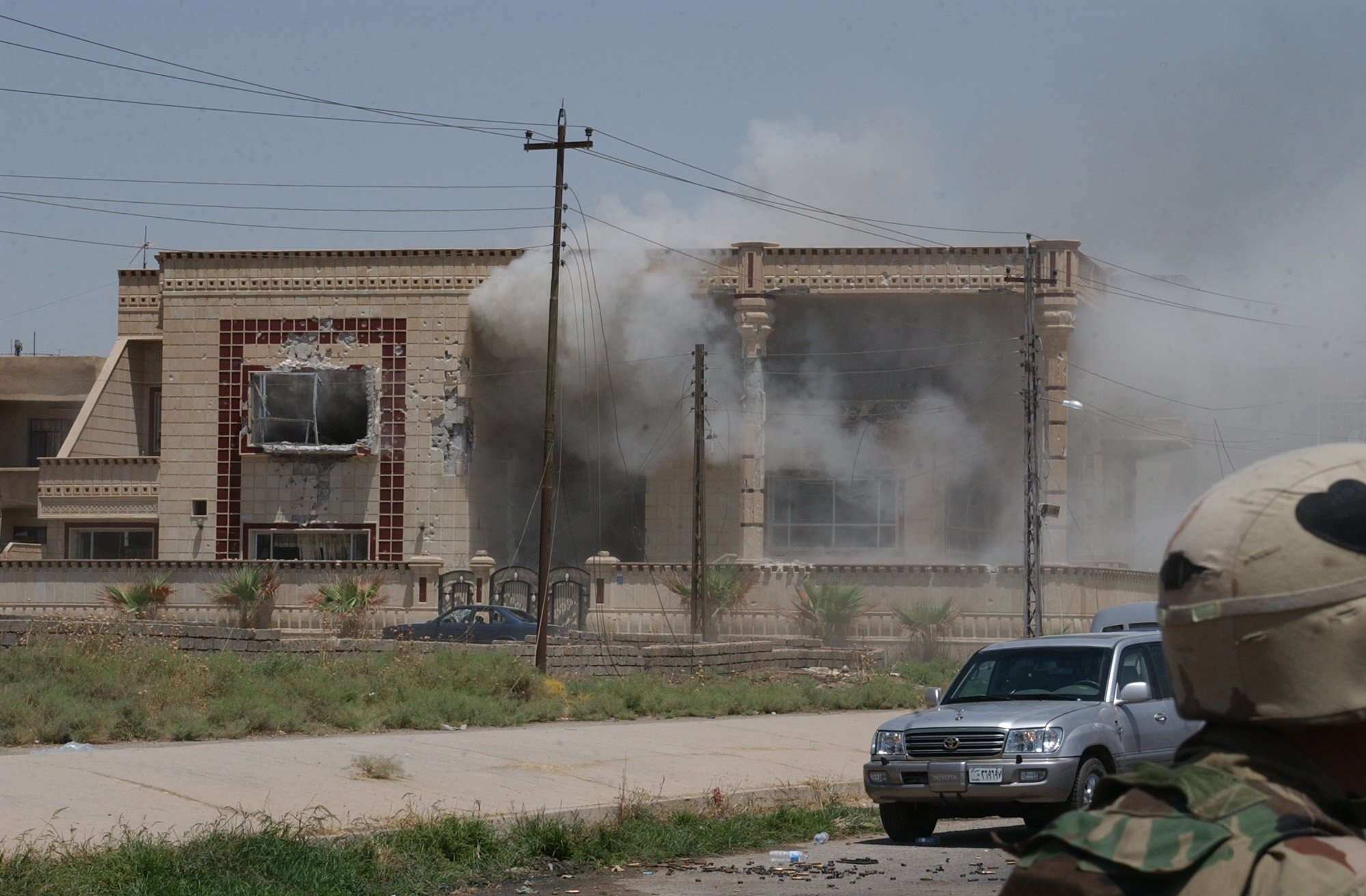
Smoke pours from Qusay and Uday Hussein's safehouse during the raid after it was hit by a TOW missile.

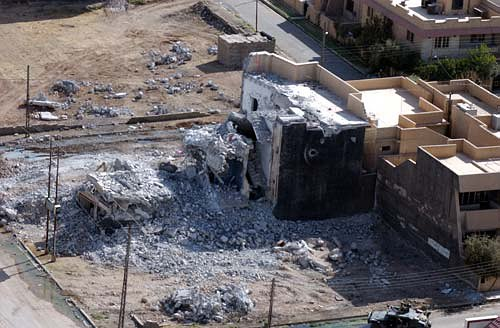
The remains of the safehouse following the battle

At 11:45 AM, several Kiowa OH-58D helicopters arrived and began firing at the safehouse, destroying a large portion of the building with machine gun rounds and rockets. Nevertheless, the task force continued to receive heavy gunfire from the house's occupants, who also lobbed grenades from the roof. Unable to neutralize the defenders, the task force initially considered using AH-64 Apache attack helicopters to destroy the safehouse but ruled it out due to concerns over potential civilian casualties.

At 1:00 PM, three hours into the operation, ten BGM-71 TOW missiles were fired at the house from Humvee-mounted launchers. The resulting explosion reduced much of the safehouse to rubble. At 1:21 PM, several American soldiers entered the ruined house to search for survivors. They found Uday and Qusay dead. As the team advanced up the stairs to the building's second floor, Qusay's 14-year-old son Mustafa Hussein, taking cover in a bedroom, opened fire on the soldiers with an AK-47, but was killed instantly by return fire.

== Aftermath ==
Following the raid, the bodies of all four occupants were removed from the house and flown to Baghdad for identification tests. Morticians reconstructed the corpses of Qusay and Uday Hussein, who were identified through DNA testing and dental records. Both men had significantly changed their appearance by growing their beards long to avoid detection; Uday had completely shaved his head. Photos of the brothers' corpses were later published by the U.S. Department of Defense and shown on TV and in newspapers, generating considerable controversy.

US officials announced that the combined $30 million reward for Qusay and Uday Hussein would be paid to the informant who tipped off Coalition authorities.

Saddam reacted to news in conflicting manner both mourning and honoring the deaths:

We thank God for honouring us with their martyrdom for His sake. Beloved Iraqis, your sons and brothers — Uday, Qusay and Qusay’s son Mustafa Hussein — practised an act of faith in the arena of jihad in Mosul, after a valiant battle with the enemy lasting a full six hours, The armies of aggression equipped with all kinds of weapons of land forces could not reach them until aircraft were used (to bomb) the house in which they were present … Once more I tell our faithful people and our glorious (Arab) nation that (we) sacrifice lives and money for the sake of God, Iraq and our nation … If Saddam Hussein had 100 sons other than Uday and Qusay, Saddam Hussein would have offered them on the same path (of martyrdom).

Uday, Qusay, and Qusay's son Mustafa Hussein were later buried alongside one-another in a cemetery in Tikrit. Qusay's other two sons, Yahya and Yaqub, are presumed to be alive but their whereabouts are unknown.

== See also ==
- Execution of Saddam Hussein
- Killing of Osama bin Laden
- Assassination of Saif al-Islam Gaddafi
