= Sajida Talfah =

First wife of Saddam Hussein

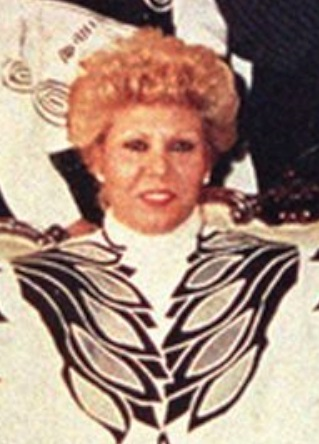
- Sajida Talfah, mid-late 1980s
- Born: Sajida Khairallah Talfah; 1935 (age 90–91); Tikrit, Kingdom of Iraq
- Other name: Sajida Hussein
- Occupation: Teacher
- Spouse: Saddam Hussein (m. 1958; died 2006)
- Children: Uday Hussein (1964–2003; deceased); Qusay Hussein (1966–2003; deceased); Raghad Hussein (b. 1968); Rana Hussein (b. 1969); Hala Hussein (b. 1972)
- Parent(s): Khairallah Talfah; Lilo Wahib
- Relatives: Adnan Khairallah (brother)

Sajida Khairallah Talfah (Arabic: ساجدة خير الله طلفاح, romanized: Sājidah Khayr Allāh Ṭilfāḥ; born 1935) is the widow of former Iraqi president Saddam Hussein, and mother of two sons (Uday and Qusay) and three daughters (Raghad, Rana, and Hala) with him. She is the oldest daughter of Khairallah Talfah, her husband's maternal uncle.

== Wife of Saddam Hussein ==
Sajida and Saddam had five children together. Their marriage was arranged when they were children. She was said to have been two years older than him. They met when Saddam was about 21 years old.

In 1964, their first son Uday was born, followed by Qusay in 1966. Their first daughter Raghad was born in 1968. Followed by a second daughter, Rana in 1969, and finally, their youngest daughter Hala was born in 1972.

In 1986, Saddam married another woman, Samira Shahbandar, while still married to Sajida. Sajida was enraged, and Uday was also angry over his father's new wife. Uday took it as an insult to his mother and also believed that his inheritance was endangered by Saddam taking a new wife. In October 1988, at a party thrown in honour of Suzanne Mubarak, the wife of Egyptian President Hosni Mubarak, Uday beat and stabbed Kamel Hana Gegeo to death. Uday believed that it was Kamel who had introduced Saddam and Samira and that he had arranged their meetings. Although her husband married another woman, Sajida and Saddam never divorced.

Sajida hardly ever appeared in public with her husband, so for many years, her existence was little known to the Iraqi people. However, when rumours surfaced that Saddam had married another woman and that his family life was now strained, more pictures and videos appeared in the Iraqi media of Saddam and Sajida, as well as them with their children. These pictures and videos were intended to make it seem as if Saddam's family life was not strained.

Sajida, along with many members of her family, fled Iraq in 1990 because of the Persian Gulf War, leaving Iraq before the bombings began. There are many different reports on where the Hussein family settled, but a possible location is Mauritania. The Hussein family returned to Iraq after the war was over.

== In popular culture ==
She was played by Shohreh Aghdashloo in the BBC adaptation House of Saddam in 2008, in which her character played a major role.

She was also played by Frida Cauchi in the 2011 adaptation The Devil’s Double.

== See also ==
- List of fugitives from justice who disappeared
