= Rana Hussein =

Daughter of Saddam Hussein (born 1971)

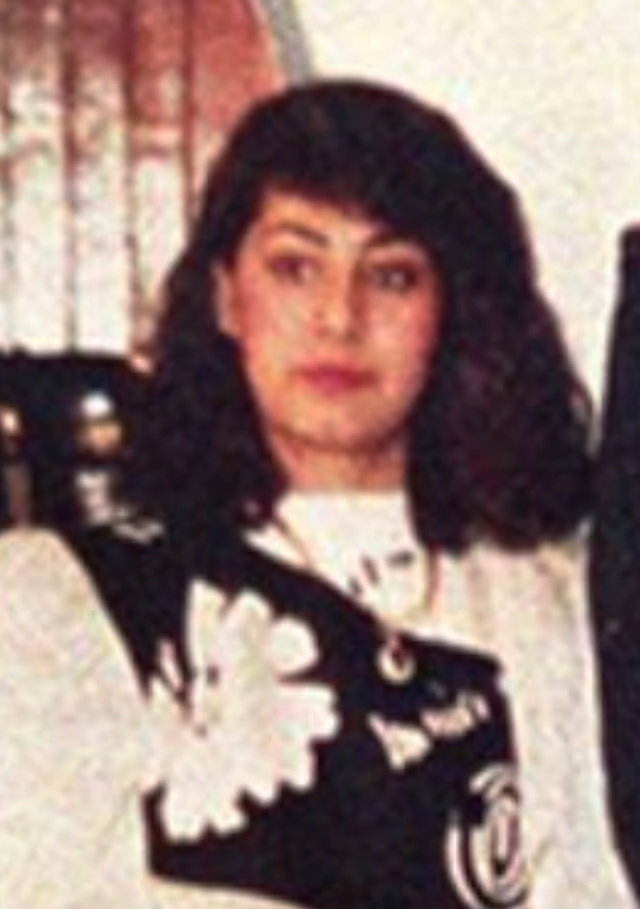
- Rana Hussein in the mid-late 1980s
- Born: Rana Saddam Hussein; 20 September 1969 (age 57)
- Spouse: Saddam Kamel (m. 1986; died 1996)
- Children: 4
- Parents: Saddam Hussein (father); Sajida Talfah (mother)
- Relatives: Uday Hussein (elder brother, deceased); Qusay Hussein (elder brother, deceased); Raghad Hussein (elder sister); Hala Hussein (younger sister)

Rana Saddam Hussein (Arabic: رنا صدام حسين; born 20 September 1969) is the second-eldest daughter of the former president of Iraq, Saddam Hussein and his first wife, Sajida Talfah. Her older sister is Raghad and younger sister is Hala.

== Biography ==
In 1986, she married Saddam Kamel al-Majid, brother of Hussein Kamel al-Majid, her elder sister Raghad's husband. She has four children. She accompanied her husband to Jordan in 1995, where she lived from 8 August of that year to 20 February 1996. They returned to Iraq after receiving assurances from Saddam Hussein that he would pardon Kamel and his brother, Hussein Kamel al-Majid. Despite this promise, before the end of the month, both Saddam Kamel al-Majid and Hussein Kamel al-Majid were shot and killed by other clan members who declared them traitors.

In 1997, her brother Uday Hussein put Rana and her sister Raghad under house arrest for involvement in a plot to assassinate him.

On 31 July 2003, she went back to Jordan, where King Abdullah granted her family asylum.

As of 2026, she still lives in Jordan.
