= Hussein Kamel al-Majid =

Iraqi politician (1954–1996)

- حسين كامل المجيد
- Hussein Kamel

Minister of Military Industries
- In office 4 February 1987 – 20 December 1995
- President: Saddam Hussein
- Preceded by: Sobhi Yassin Khudair al-Samarrai
- Succeeded by: Adnan Abdul Majid al-Ani

Personal details
- Born: 1954 Tel Al Thahab, Kingdom of Iraq
- Died: February 23, 1996 (aged 41–42) Baghdad, Republic of Iraq
- Party: Arab Socialist Ba'ath Party
- Spouse: Raghad Hussein (m. 1983)
- Children: 5
- Relatives: Saddam (brother); Ali (uncle)

Military service
- Allegiance: Ba'athist Iraq
- Branch/service: Iraqi Ground Forces
- Years of service: 1974–1995
- Rank: Colonel general
- Unit: Republican Guard
- Battles/wars: Iran–Iraq War; Gulf War; 1991 uprisings in Iraq; Battle of Karbala (1991)

Colonel General Hussein Kamel Hassan al-Majid (Arabic: حسين كامل حسن المجيد) (1954 – 23 February 1996) was an Iraqi military officer and the son-in-law and first cousin once removed of former Iraqi president Saddam Hussein. He defected to Jordan and assisted United Nations Special Commission (UNSCOM) and International Atomic Energy Agency (IAEA) inspection teams assigned to look for weapons of mass destruction in Iraq. He was killed the following year for betraying Saddam.

== Early life and military career ==
Hussein was born in Tel Al Thahab (in modern-day Balad District, Saladin Governorate). He rose through the military ranks to become the Supervisor of the Republican Guard, Iraq's elite military force, in 1982. He later became the Minister of Industries, heading the Military Industrialisation Commission and supervising Iraq's weapons development programs from 1987. Hussein became Oil Minister of Iraq in 1990.

Hussein married one of Saddam Hussein's daughters, Raghad Saddam, and lived in Iraq until 1995. On 17 August of that year, he and his wife defected from Iraq, along with his brother, Saddam Kamel, and his brother's wife, Rana Saddam, another of Saddam's daughters. In a 21 September 1995 interview with CNN, Hussein Kamel explained:

This is what made me leave the country, the fact that Saddam Hussein surrounds himself with inefficient ministers and advisers who are not chosen for their competence but according to the whims of the Iraqi president. And as a result of this the whole of Iraq is suffering.

Jordan granted asylum to the Kamel brothers, and there they began to cooperate with UNSCOM and its director Rolf Ekéus, the American CIA and the British MI6. The initial promises of a wealth of information were, allegedly, not fulfilled. According to U.S. and Jordanian officials, the intelligence provided by Hussein Kamel on Iraqi secret weapons programs was of limited content and value.

Hussein confirmed what inspectors had been able to ascertain shortly before his defection: Iraq had operated a biological warfare program prior to the Gulf War, but had destroyed its entire stockpile of chemical and biological weapons and banned missiles. Hussein's defection presented a major problem for those seeking to overthrow the Iraqi government based on the threat of its WMD program.

== Return to Iraq and death ==
In February 1996, after intermediaries for Saddam Hussein had assured them that all would be forgiven, Hussein and Saddam Kamel were convinced to return to Iraq with their wives and children. Reportedly, immediately upon their return, they were ordered to divorce their wives and were denounced as traitors. Three days after their arrival, on 23 February, they refused to surrender to Saddam's security forces and were killed in a 13-hour firefight at a safe house.

According to an alternative version of events, Kamel and his sons were killed less than 24 hours following the divorce decrees, in a gun battle with other cousins trying to regain their clan honor in the eyes of Saddam.

Another story of the event from the BBC documentary ‘’Saddam's Tribe’’, which one of its producers had an interview with Raghdad Hussein, is that her husband and his brother, along with their family, were all killed under house arrest by Ali Hassan al-Majid (also known as "Chemical Ali" in the west) after he and two Iraqi soldiers gunned them down.

In a 2021 interview, Raghad Hussein provided a first-hand account of the events following the return to Iraq, stating that Hussein Kamel had personally longed to return to Baghdad rather than being solely lured by false promises of a pardon. According to Raghad, the families arrived in Baghdad at night and remained together until the following afternoon, when the official decree was issued for Raghad and Rana Hussein to divorce Hussein Kamel and Saddam Kamel.

Raghad described a private family meeting held during this period attended by herself, Rana, Qusay Hussein, and Saddam Hussein. She noted that Saddam appeared uncharacteristically "choked up" and visibly pained by the defection of the brothers, whom he had previously treated as sons. Regarding the firefight on 23 February 1996, Raghad characterized the execution as a tribal honor killing rather than a formal state action. She recounted a leadership meeting where Izzat Ibrahim al-Douri suggested the state waive its right to punishment, but members of the al-Majid clan led by Ali Hassan al-Majid insisted on their tribal right to "wash away the shame" of the defection, a demand that Saddam Hussein ultimately sanctioned.

== Aftermath ==
In a 25 January 1999 report to the U.N. Security Council, UNSCOM declared that the history of the Iraqi weapons inspections "must be divided into two parts, separated by the events following the departure from Iraq, in August 1995, of Lt. Gen. Hussein Kamel."

Hussein maintained that Iraq had destroyed its weapons of mass destruction and related programs after the end of the first Gulf War.

I ordered destruction of all chemical weapons. All weapons—biological, chemical, missile, nuclear—were destroyed.

A 3 March 2003 Newsweek report said that Hussein's revelations were "hushed up" because inspectors "hoped to bluff Saddam [Hussein] into revealing still more." Hussein's version of events appear to have been borne out in the wake of the 2003 Invasion of Iraq.

In the build-up to the 2003 invasion, Bush administration figures—including George W. Bush, Dick Cheney, Donald Rumsfeld and Colin Powell—repeatedly cited Hussein's testimony as evidence that Iraq possessed weapons of mass destruction.

== See also ==
- House of Saddam
