= Kamel Hana Gegeo =

Iraqi bodyguard

Kamel Hana Gegeo ܟܐܡܠ ܗܢܐ ܓܐܓܘ كامل حنا ججو
- Born: c. 1960s
- Died: 18 October 1988
- Cause of death: Murder

Kamel Hana Gegeo (Syriac: ܟܐܡܠ ܚܢܢ ܓܓܘ; Arabic: كامل حنا ججو; c. 1960s – 18 October 1988) was an Iraqi Assyrian bodyguard, valet, and food taster of Iraqi president Saddam Hussein. He was murdered by Saddam's son Uday Hussein at a party with Egyptian president Hosni Mubarak as a guest.

== Career ==
Gegeo is said to have introduced Saddam to his second wife, Samira Shahbandar, and arranged trysts between them, which led to a feud between Gegeo and Sajida Talfah (Saddam's first wife), and Uday Hussein, who took it as an insult against his mother Sajida. Gegeo's father, Hana Gegeo, was one of Saddam Hussein’s personal chefs; his mother was the nanny of Hala (one of Saddam's daughters). His brother, Malco Hana Gegeo (Arabic: ملكو حنا ججو), was a military man assigned by Saddam to form the Assyrian forces, which were then called the Assyrian regiment.

== Death ==
On 18 October 1988, Gegeo was murdered by Uday Hussein. During a party thrown in honour of Suzanne Mubarak (the wife of Egyptian president Hosni Mubarak), Uday bludgeoned Gegeo with a club in front of guests, and by some accounts, finally shot him to death, possibly acting on orders from his mother. Saddam was willing to punish Uday and arrest him for murder, but after multiple pleas by his first wife Sajida Talfah and Gegeo’s parents to pardon Uday, he exiled him to Switzerland instead of imprisoning him. Mubarak later called Uday a "psychopath".
