= Raghad Hussein =

Daughter of Saddam Hussein (born 1968)

- رغد حسين
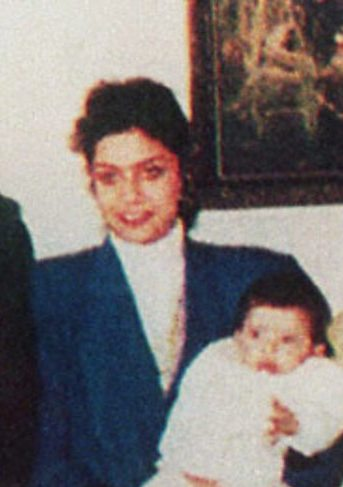
- Raghad in the mid-late 1980s
- Born: Raghad Saddam Hussein; 2 September 1968 (age 58); Iraqi Republic
- Political party: Ba'ath Party
- Spouse: Hussein Kamel al-Majid (m. 1983; died 1996)
- Children: 5
- Parents: Saddam Hussein (father); Sajida Talfah (mother)
- Relatives: Uday Hussein (brother); Qusay Hussein (brother); Rana Hussein (sister); Hala Hussein (sister)

Raghad Saddam Hussein (Arabic: رغد صدام حسين; born 2 September 1968) is an Iraqi exiled politician and the eldest daughter of former Iraqi president Saddam Hussein.

== Biography ==
Raghad Hussein was married in 1983 to Hussein Kamel al-Majid, her cousin who later defected in 1995 and shared government weapons secrets with UNSCOM, the CIA and MI6. Hussein Kamel was killed in 1996 along with his brother Saddam Kamel, allegedly by fellow clan members who declared them traitors. Saddam Hussein had allegedly made it clear that although he had pardoned both Hussein Kamel and his brother, they would lose all status, and would not receive any protection.

Raghad Hussein had five children with Hussein Kamel: three sons, Ali, Saddam and Wahej; and two daughters, Hareer and Banan.

In 2003, Raghad and many prominent Iraqi Baathists fled to Jordan where King Abdullah II gave her personal protection.

On July 2, 2006, the Iraqi government's national security advisor Muwaffaq al-Rubaie declared that Raghad and her mother were wanted because they supported the insurgency in Iraq. The Jordanian Prime Minister, Marouf al-Bakhit, made a statement that "Raghad was under the royal family's protection," and "the presence of Mrs. Raghad Saddam Hussein and her children in Jordan is motivated by humanitarian considerations. She is the guest of the Hashemite royal family (of King Abdullah II), and under its protection as a seeker of asylum in accordance with Arab tradition". Her exact location, however, has not been disclosed.

On December 30, 2006, Saddam Hussein was executed in Iraq. Prior to the execution, Raghad Hussein asked for her father's body to be temporarily buried in Yemen, until coalition forces are expelled from Iraq.

In February 2021, she appeared in a six-part televised interview on Al Arabiya in her first media appearance in years. She discussed her memories, family matters, and her willingness to eventually return to Iraq and play a political role, which created some diplomatic tensions in the region and controversy amongst public opinion in Iraq.

As of 2023, Raghad Hussein still lives in Jordan since leaving Iraq in 2003.

== Arrest warrant ==
In August 2007, the international police agency Interpol announced that it had circulated an arrest warrant for Hussein, on suspicions that she and her aides had been assisting the insurgency in Iraq. These suspicions were reflected in an August 2014 article in Spiegel Online, which proposed the title "Terror Godmother". The article reports that, while living in opulence in Jordan, Hussein's fortune in the double-digit millions is used to support the Islamic State of Iraq and the Levant (ISIL), with the ultimate goal of returning to regain power in Baghdad. Earlier in June, Fox News Channel had quoted such an intention expressed by Hussein in an interview she had given.

Hussein is listed on Iraq's most wanted list of individuals alongside 59 others. It also features 28 ISIL fighters, 12 from Al-Qaeda and 20 from the Baath party, giving details of the roles they play in their organisations, the crimes of which they are suspected, and, in most cases, photographs. As of 2021, she was still living in Amman, but wished to return to Iraq.

On 22 October 2023, a court in Baghdad sentenced her in absentia to seven years in prison for promoting activities of the outlawed Baath party during her television interviews in 2021.

== See also ==
- List of fugitives from justice who disappeared
