= Adnan Khayr Allah =

23rd Iraqi Minister of Defense

Colonel general Adnan Khairallah
- عدنان خير الله طلفاح
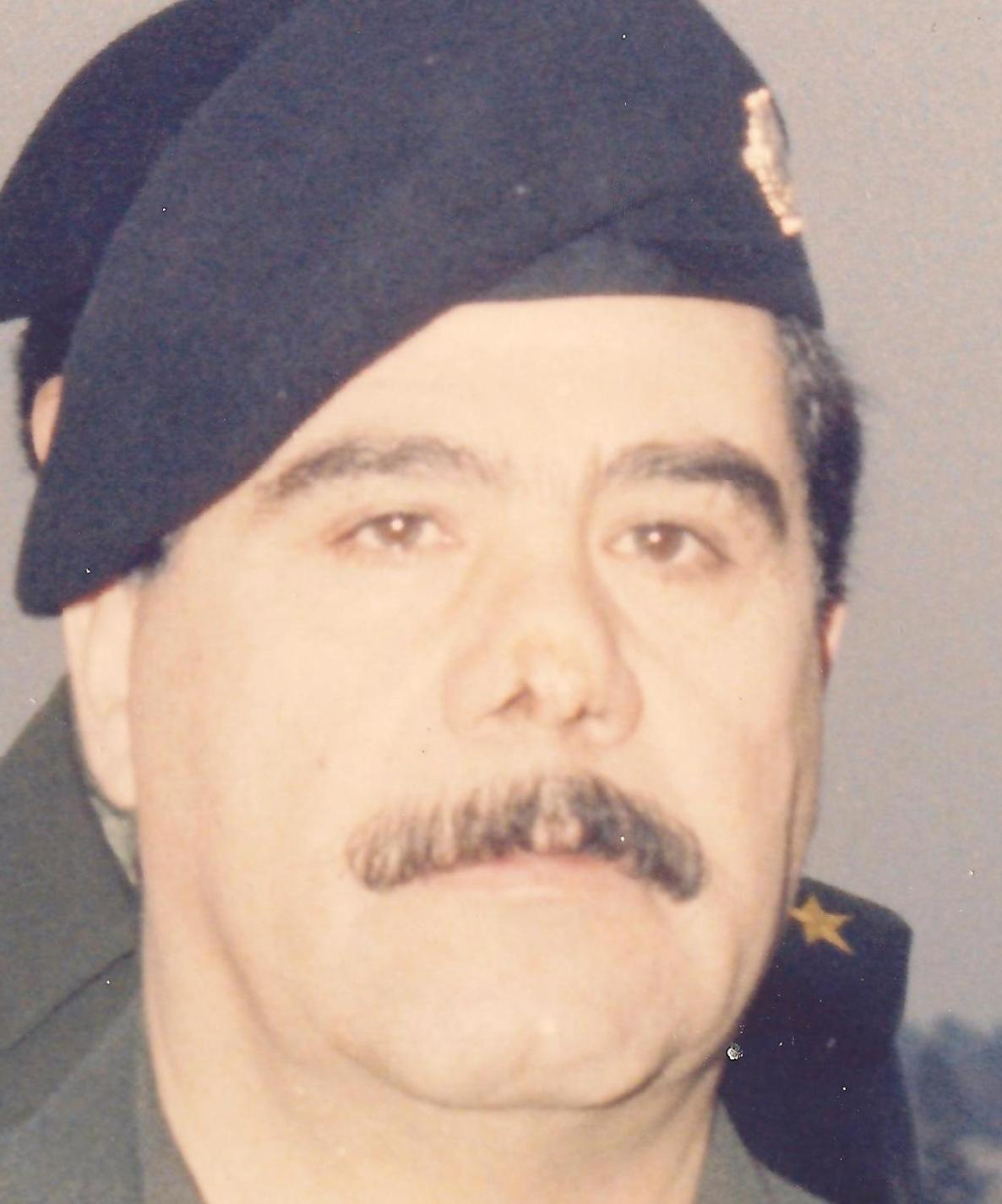
- Adnan c. 1989

Minister of Defence
- In office 15 October 1977 – 4 May 1989
- President: Saddam Hussein
- Preceded by: Ahmed Hassan al-Bakr
- Succeeded by: Abdul Jabbar Khalil Shanshal

Member of the Revolutionary Command Council
- In office September 1979 – 4 May 1989

Member of the Regional Command of the Iraqi Regional Branch
- In office January 1974 – 4 May 1989

Personal details
- Born: c. 1940 Tikrit, Kingdom of Iraq
- Died: 4 May 1989 (aged 49) Mosul, Ba'athist Iraq
- Party: Arab Socialist Ba'ath Party
- Spouse: Haifa Ahmed
- Parent(s): Khairallah Talfah; Lilo Wahib
- Relatives: Ahmed Hassan al-Bakr (father-in-law); Sajida Talfah (sister); Saddam Hussein (brother-in-law and cousin)
- Education: University of Baghdad

Military service
- Allegiance: Iraqi Republic (1959–1968); Baathist Iraq (1968–1989)
- Branch/service: Iraqi Ground Forces (Army Aviation)
- Years of service: 1959–1989
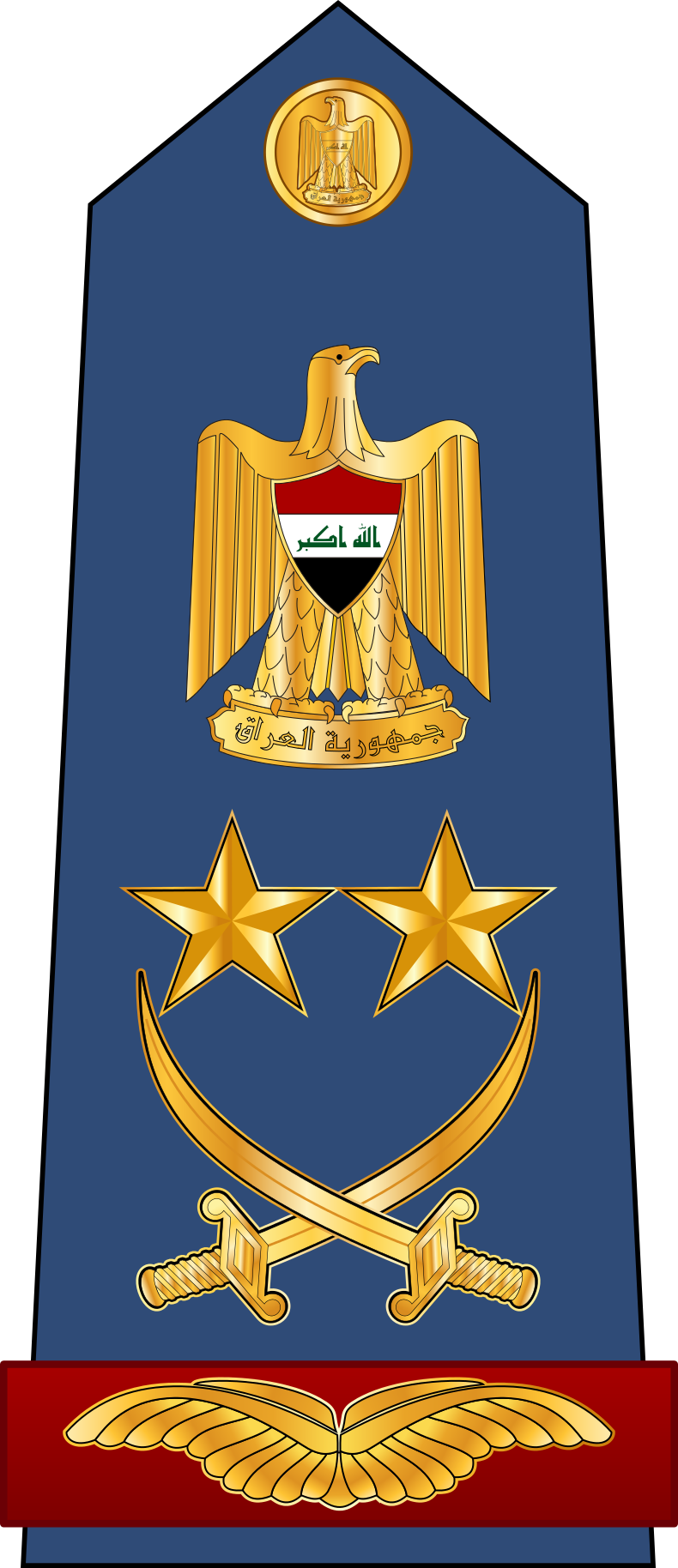
- Rank: Colonel General
- Battles/wars: First Iraqi-Kurdish War; Second Iraqi-Kurdish War; Iran–Iraq War

Colonel General Adnan Khayr Allah (Arabic: عدنان خير الله طلفاح, romanized: ʿAdnān Khayr Allāḥ; 1940 – 4 May 1989) was an Iraqi military officer and Saddam Hussein's brother-in-law and cousin. He held several titles and was a member of the Iraqi Revolutionary Command Council. He also served as the Defence Minister of Iraq from 1979 until his death a decade later, being appointed days after Saddam Hussein succeeded to the Presidency.

He died in 1989 in a helicopter crash that was officially labeled an accident. The circumstances surrounding his death, including his disputes with Saddam and rumors of a potential coup, have led some to believe Adnan was assassinated under orders from Saddam.

== Early life and education ==
Adnan was born in Tikrit in 1940, the son of Khairallah Talfah, an Arab nationalist officer in the Iraqi Army who was later involved in the 1941 Iraqi coup d'état and the ensuing Anglo-Iraqi War. Adnan's father was also the maternal uncle of Saddam Hussein, who would later marry Adnan's sister, Sajida. Adnan attended the Baghdad Military College and the Staff College, and later graduated with a degree from the Baghdad University School of Law and Politics in 1975.

Since he was fourteen years old, he used to carry a camera with him and he owned an archive of photos of Saddam Hussein and the family and a large collection of photos of the areas in which he served, which tell the story of the development of Iraqi cities and districts

== Ba'ath Party ==
Adnan joined the Iraqi branch of the Ba'ath Party in 1956. He was arrested in 1959 following an unsuccessful attempt by the party to assassinate then-Prime Minister Abd al-Karim Qasim. Adnan would later go on to play a role in the 1963 and 1968 coups that brought the Ba'ath party to power.

In 1977, Adnan was appointed as the new Minister of Defence, taking over from Ahmed Hassan al-Bakr, then Iraqi President and Secretary of the Iraqi Regional Command of the Ba'ath Party. He was also appointed Minister of State, and held membership ini both the Ba'ath Party Regional Command and the Revolutionary Command Council, the primary decision-making body in Iraq. In 1979, he was appointed Deputy Prime Minister.

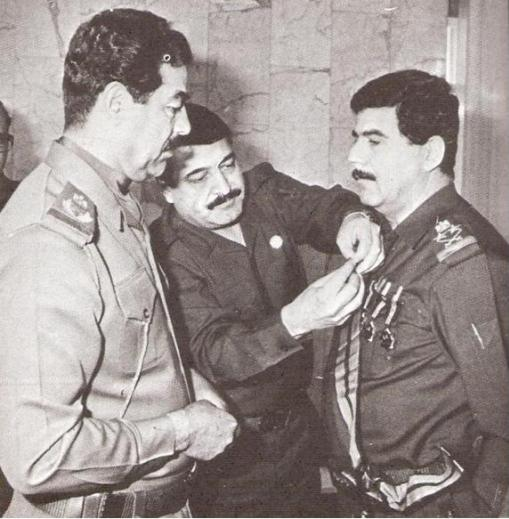
Adnan being awarded by Saddam Hussein

Adnan served as Iraqi Minister of Defence throughout the Iran–Iraq War, and was appointed Deputy Supreme Commander of the Armed Forces, second only to Saddam Hussein. In this position, he played a crucial role in rebuilding and modernizing the Iraqi military.

== Rift with Saddam ==
In November 1988, Uday Hussein, Adnan's nephew and Saddam Hussein's eldest child, was arrested under orders from Saddam following an incident in which Uday was accused of killing Kamel Hana Gegeo, an officer serving as one of Saddam's presidential bodyguards. The scandal caused a rift in the family, with Uday's mother and Adnan's sister, Sajida, appealing to Adnan for help. Adnan then disappeared from public view, amid reports of unrest in the army, a potential coup, and the arrest of several military officers, prompting speculation about the involvement of Adnan in a coup attempt against Saddam.

Adnan later resurfaced in early 1989 when video footage was released showing Adnan, Sajida, and Saddam on a fishing holiday near Basra. Following his return to public view, he resumed his regular duties as Defence Minister.

== Death and aftermath ==
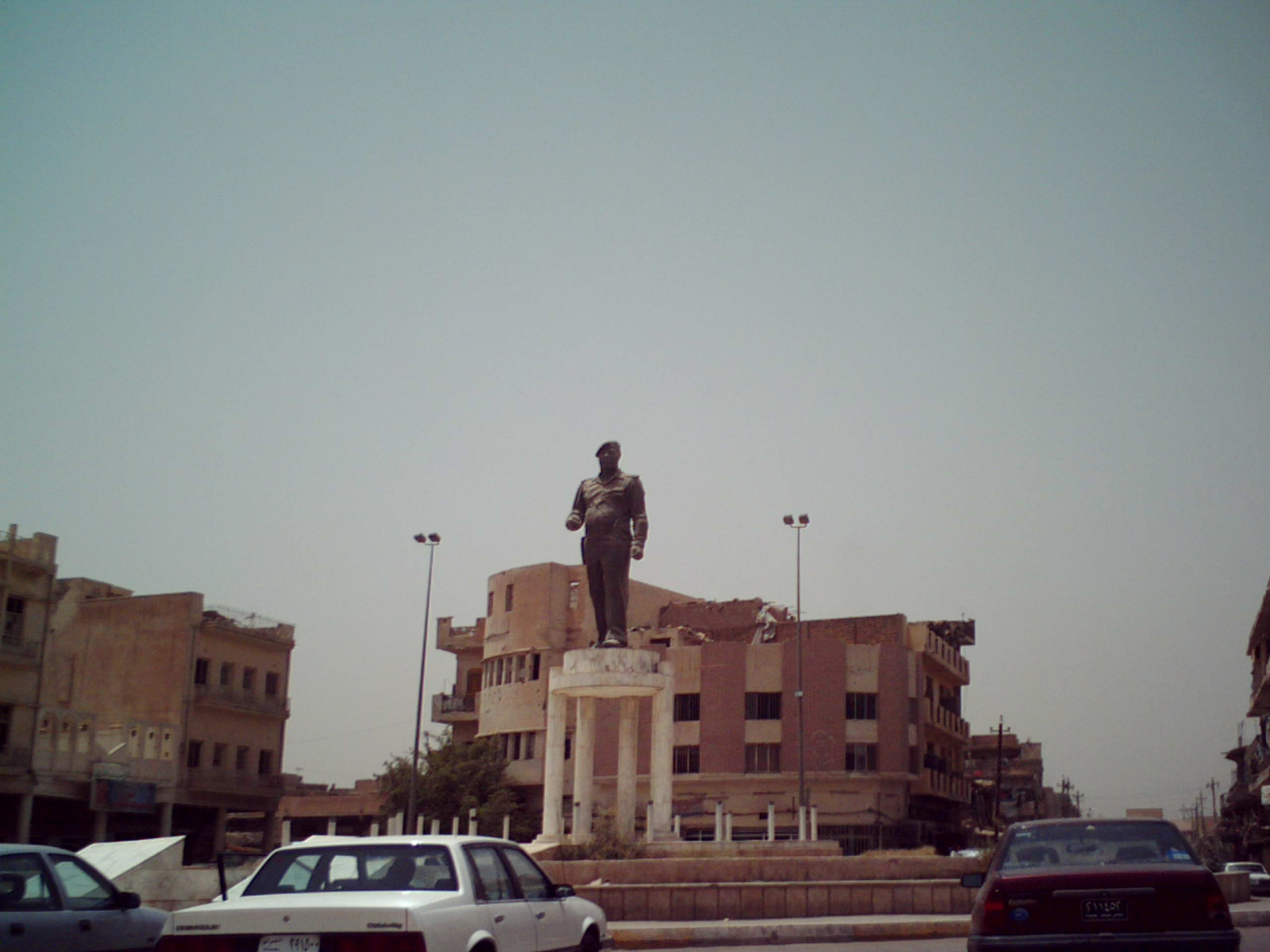
Adnan Khairallah's statue in Baghdad, 2003.

On 7 May 1989, Saddam Hussein announced that Adnan had died three days earlier in a helicopter crash. Adnan had been travelling by helicopter from Baghdad to Kurdistan region to inspect army positions when he had his flight diverted to meet several members of the Presidential family in the mountain resort of Sarsang, near Dohuk. While en route, his helicopter and two escorting helicopters were caught in a sandstorm. The crew of the two escorting helicopters and one person travelling on Adnan's helicopter survived.

Announcing Adnan's death, Saddam referred to him as "one of the distinguished war heroes and a sparkling star in Iraq's sky." Baghdad Radio announced that Adnan would be given a state funeral and buried in his hometown of Tikrit. A statue was also erected in Baghdad in his memory.

Although labeled an accident, speculation surrounded his death due to the detonation of four explosive charges on the helicopter he was in. Saddam's son-in-law Hussein Kamel al-Majid admitted helping to orchestrate Adnan's death, according to author Con Coughlin.

Although a relative of Saddam's, Adnan remained a popular figure even after the Iraq War and a square named in his honour exists to this day in the al-Karkh area of Baghdad where his statue continued to stand following the fall of Baghdad in 2003, unlike those of other Saddam-era figures which were all immediately removed after the invasion. Reevaluation of Adnan's actions led to the removal of his statue in 2009.
