= Qusay Hussein =

Iraqi politician (1966–2003)

Qusay Saddam Hussein
- قصي صدام حسين

Commander of the Fedayeen Saddam
- In office 3 January 1997 – 9 April 2003
- President: Saddam Hussein
- Preceded by: Uday Hussein
- Succeeded by: Position abolished

Member of the Regional Command of the Arab Socialist Ba'ath Party – Iraq Region
- In office 18 May 2001 – 9 April 2003

Director of the Iraqi Special Security Organization
- In office 1992–2001
- President: Saddam Hussein
- Preceded by: Fannar Zibin al-Hassan
- Succeeded by: Walid Hamid Tawfiq

Personal details
- Born: Qusay Saddam Hussein al-Nasiri al-Tikriti; 17 May 1966 Baghdad, Iraq
- Died: 22 July 2003 (aged 37) Mosul, Iraq
- Cause of death: Gunshot wounds
- Resting place: Al-Awja, Iraq
- Party: Iraqi Regional Branch of the Arab Socialist Ba'ath Party
- Spouse: Sahar Abd al-Rashid (m. 1988)
- Children: 4
- Parent(s): Saddam Hussein; Sajida Talfah
- Relatives: Uday (brother); Raghad (sister); Rana (sister); Hala (sister); Maher Abdul Rashid (father-in-law)

Military service
- Allegiance: Iraq
- Branch/service: Republican Guard
- Years of service: 1991–2003
- Rank: Honorable Supervisor of the Republican Guard
- Battles/wars: 1991 Iraqi uprisings Iraq War

Qusay Saddam Hussein al-Nasiri al-Tikriti (Arabic: قصي صدام حسين; 17 May 1966 – 22 July 2003) was an Iraqi politician, military officer, and the second son of Saddam Hussein. He was appointed as his father's heir apparent from 2000 until his death in 2003. He was deputy head of the Iraqi Special Security Organization and was also in charge of the Republican Guard, a branch of the Iraqi military.

Although he had a lower public profile compared to his brother Uday, he was said to have had a key role in crushing opposition during the 1991 Iraqi uprisings. As deputy head of the Special Security Organization, he was said to have authorized the use of torture against dissidents. Qusay served as the director of the Iraqi Special Security Organization from 1992 to 1997 and was in charge of the elite Republican Guard and Special Republican Guard, which were crucial to Saddam's regime. While his older brother Uday was known for being flamboyant and erratic, Qusay maintained a lower public profile and was considered quiet, calculating, and equally ruthless.

He was allegedly involved in severe human rights abuses, including directing the brutal suppression of the Shia uprising in southern Iraq after the 1991 Gulf War, which included the destruction of the southern marshes, and authorizing the torture and execution of political prisoners. Due to Uday's behavior and injuries from a 1996 assassination attempt, Qusay was increasingly groomed to succeed his father. Qusay, his son Mustafa, and his brother Uday were killed in a 2003 U.S. raid in Mosul, during the U.S.-led invasion of Iraq.

== Biography ==
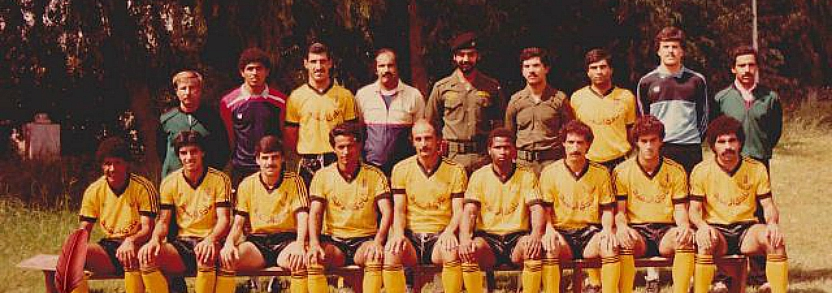
Squad of Al-Rasheed in the 1984–85 season. Uday Hussein and Qusay Hussein are in the top row, middle.

Qusay was born in Baghdad in 1966 to Ba'athist revolutionary Saddam Hussein, who was in prison at the time, and his wife and cousin, Sajida Talfah. Some sources have said he was born in 1965, while others have said it was either 1967 or 1968. He was widely described to be a family man and an attorney in training. He was said to have loathed the extravagance of his brother Uday, who was said to have personally victimized him as a child. Qusay exhibited several germaphobic tendencies, often cleaning himself after being touched, even by his children.

He married Lama Maher Abd al-Rashid; the daughter of Maher Abd al-Rashid, a top-ranking military official, and had four children: a daughter named Moj (born 1987) and sons Mustafa (1989–2003), Adnan (born 1991), and Saddam (born 1997).

Qusay reportedly played a role in crushing the Shia uprising in the aftermath of the 1991 Gulf War and is also thought to have masterminded the destruction of the southern marshes of Iraq. The wholesale destruction of these marshes ended a centuries-old way of life that prevailed among the Shia Marsh Arabs who made the wetlands their home, and ruined the habitat for dozens of species of migratory birds. The Iraqi government stated that the action was intended to produce usable farmland, though a number of outsiders believe the destruction was aimed at the Marsh Arabs as retribution for their participation in the 1991 uprising.

Uday was viewed as their father's heir apparent until he sustained serious injuries in a 1996 assassination attempt. Unlike Uday, who was known for extravagance and erratic, violent behavior, Qusay kept a low profile.

As the deputy head of the Iraqi Special Security Organization (Arabic: الأمن الخاص, Al-Amn al-Khas), numerous torture methods were utilized.

Iraqi dissidents claimed that Qusay was responsible for the killing of many political activists. The Sunday Times reported that Qusay Hussein ordered the killing of Khalis Mohsen al-Tikriti, an engineer at the military industrialization organization, because he believed Mohsen was planning to leave Iraq. He was said to have personally killed several prisoners as he walked prisons. In 1998, Iraqi opposition groups accused Qusay of ordering the execution of thousands of political prisoners, after hundreds of inmates were similarly executed to make room for new prisoners in crowded jails.

Hussein's service in the Iraqi Republican Guard began around 2000. He had the final say in many military decisions unless Saddam intervened.

Despite his power and cunningness, Iraq's Defense minister Sultan Hashim Ahmed al-Tai claimed that Qusay "knew nothing [about commanding military]. He understood only simple military things like a civilian. We prepared information and advice for him, and he'd accept it or not." Ra'ad al-Hamdani, who was Qusay's commanding officer during the 1980s, provided a partially positive assessment of him, claiming that he saved several officers (including al-Hamdani himself) whenever they had disagreements with Saddam. After 1991, Al-Hamdani remarked to Qusay that if his favorite uncle Adnan Khairallah had been alive, the Gulf War would have never happened, to which Qusay nodded in agreement.

Qusay predominately lived in Al-Jadriya, Baghdad. He owned several farms, including in al-Dora, where he grew figs, oranges, limes, apricots, pomegranates and dates.

Hours before the 2003 invasion of Iraq, Qusay withdrew approximately $1 billion from the Iraqi central bank in Baghdad, acting on personal orders from Saddam. He arrived at the bank in Baghdad at 4am on 18 March, hours before the first US strikes, seized around $900 million in $100 bills and the equivalent of $100 million in euros, loaded them into three tractor-trailers, and left. This was considered the largest bank heist in history until 2011.

=== Assassination attempt ===
On 1 August 2002, Qusay was shot by members of the Iraqi National Congress during a motorcade journey. He received injuries to his arm. He was said to have survived a previous assassination attempt in 2001.

== Death ==
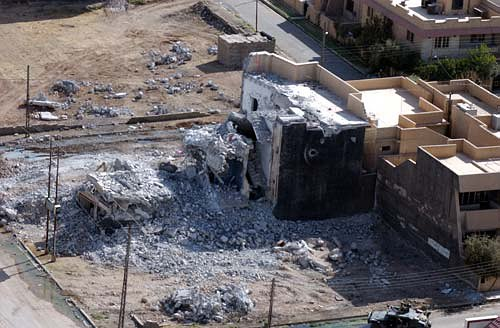
House of Uday and Qusay Hussein in Mosul, Iraq, damaged by American forces, 31 July 2003. Both were killed.

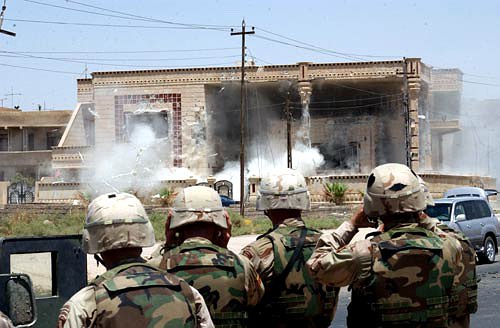
U.S. Army soldiers from the 101st Airborne Division watch as a TOW missile strikes the side of a house of Uday and Qusay Hussein in Mosul, Iraq, 22 July 2003.

Saddam Hussein's closest aide and personal secretary, Abid Hamid Mahmud, had been captured, and told his interrogators that he and Saddam's two sons had sought refuge in Syria but were turned back. According to the smuggler who took them across the border, they came again after less than 48 hours. They said to the smuggler: "A Syrian citizen will be waiting for a call from them and my mission is limited to bring them to the borders, not inside Syria." The smuggler said, "They sought refuge with some of their acquaintances near the Rabia border center, and they already reached the outskirts of the city of Aleppo, and there, after replacing the broken tires of their car, the Syrian authorities, who ordered their return to Iraq, stopped them. Abd Hammoud was not staying with them, but he visited them for four days and on the fourth day they left the house. Accompanying Abid Hamid towards Mosul, there Uday and Qusay took refuge in the house of Nawaf al-Zaidan, joined by Mustafa Qusay, who was staying with his grandfather, Maher Abdul-Rashid. On 16 July 2003, he met with Qusay again, asked if he had an intention to get out of Iraq, to which Qusay replied, 'This is no longer possible. I will stay in Iraq awaiting the instructions of the father.' During their time at the villa, the sheikh reportedly left Uday and Qusay playing video games for weeks. Seven days later, Uday, Qusay, Qusay's 14-year-old son Mustafa, and their companion Abdul-Samad were killed." Abdul Halim Khaddam, the former vice-president of Syria, revealed that his country handed over the half-brother of Saddam Hussein to the American forces. They also deported the sons of the ousted president to Iraq and refused to receive the former foreign minister, Tariq Aziz.

On the afternoon of 22 July 2003, troops of the 101st Airborne 3/327th Infantry HQ and C-Company, aided by U.S. Special Forces, killed Qusay Hussein, his 14-year-old son Mustafa, his older brother Uday Hussein and a bodyguard during a raid on a house in the northern Iraqi city of Mosul. Acting on a tip provided the previous day from Nawaf al-Zaidan, an alleged cousin and friend of Saddam Hussein who had been sheltering the four in his home for numerous weeks, a special forces team attempted to apprehend everyone in the house at the time. After being fired upon, the special forces moved back and called for backup. After Task Force 121 members were wounded, the 3/327th Infantry surrounded and fired on the house with a TOW missile, Mk 19 grenade launcher, M2 machine guns and small arms. After about five hours of battle (the whole operation lasted 6 hours), the soldiers entered the house and found four dead, including the two brothers and their bodyguard. There were reports that Qusay Hussein's 14-year-old son Mustafa was the fourth body found. Brigadier General Frank Helmick, the assistant commander of 101st Airborne, commented that all occupants of the house died during the gun battle before U.S. troops were able to enter.

Soldiers, who tried to enter the house three times, encountered small arms fire and grenades in the first two attempts. Uday, Qusay, and their guard protected the street and the first floor from the bathroom at the front of the house; Qusay's son took cover from the bedroom in the back. The American forces then bombed the house many times and even fired missiles. Three adults were thought to have died due to the TOW missile fired into the front of the house. In the third attempt, the soldiers killed Qusay's son after he fired at them.

Brigade commander Colonel Joe Anderson said an Arabic announcement was made at 10 A.M. on the day and called on people inside to come out peacefully. In response, the occupants opened fire. An experienced team of commandos tried to attack the building, but they had to retreat under fire. Four American soldiers were injured. Anderson then ordered his men to fire with 50-caliber heavy machine guns. Uday and Qusay Hussein refused to surrender even after a helicopter fired a rocket and the Strike Brigade fired 40mm grenades at them. The Colonel decided that more firepower was necessary to take down the brothers, leading to 12 TOW missiles being fired into the building.

After his sons' death, Saddam Hussein recorded a tape and said,

"Beloved Iraqis, your brothers Uday and Qusay, and Mustafa, the son of Qusay, took a stand of faith, which pleases God, makes a friend happy, and makes an enemy angry. They stood in the arena of jihad in Mosul, after a valiant battle with the enemy that lasted six hours. The armies of aggression mobilised all types of weapons of the ground forces against them and succeeded to harm them only when they used planes against the house where they were. Thus, they adopted a stand with which God has honoured this Hussein family so that the present would be a continuation of the brilliant, genuine, faithful, and honourable past. We thank God for what he has ordained for us when he honoured us with their martyrdom for his sake. We ask Almighty God to satisfy them and all the righteous martyrs after they satisfied him with their faithful Jihadist stand. Had Saddam Hussein had 100 children, other than Uday and Qusay, Saddam Hussein would have sacrificed them on the same path. God honoured us by their martyrdom. If you had killed Uday, Qusay, Mustafa, and another mujahideen man with them, all the youths of our nation and the youths of Iraq are Uday, Qusay, and Mustafa in the fields of jihad."

On 23 July 2003, the American command stated that it had conclusively identified two of the dead men as Saddam Hussein's sons from dental records. Because many Iraqis were skeptical of news of the deaths, the U.S. Government released photos of the corpses and allowed Iraq's governing council to identify the bodies despite the U.S. objection to the publication of American corpses on Arab television. Both brothers had grown long beards to avoid detection. Afterwards, their bodies were reconstructed by morticians. For example, Qusay Hussein's beard was shaved and facial gashes from the battle were removed. Both he and Uday were embalmed. Qusay Hussein was the ace of clubs in the coalition forces' most-wanted Iraqi playing cards. His father was the ace of spades, and his brother was the ace of hearts.

The U.S. government also announced that the informant (possibly the owner of the villa, Nawaf al-Zaidan, in Mosul in which the brothers were killed) would receive the combined $30 million reward previously offered for their apprehension.

Qusay Hussein's two other sons, Yahya Qusay and Yaqub Qusay, are presumed alive, but their whereabouts are unknown.

In 2017, his nephew Massoud claimed his body was stolen by the Iranian government although this was unproven.
