= U.S. list of most-wanted Iraqis =

In April 2003, the United States drew up a list of most-wanted Iraqis, consisting of the 55 members of the deposed Ba'athist Iraqi regime whom they most wanted to capture. The list was turned into a set of playing cards for distribution to United States-led Coalition troops. Later, in 2003, the list was renumbered so that it mostly conformed to the order of the playing cards (see most-wanted Iraqi playing cards).

== List ==
As of 2 April 2026

- Total 55
- Dead: 35
- Imprisoned: 4
- Released: 13
- At large: 3

Dead	Imprisoned	Released	At large

No.	Name	Role	Status
1.	Saddam Hussein	President of Iraq	Executed on 30 December 2006
2.	Qusay Hussein	Director of the SSO	Killed on 22 July 2003
3.	Uday Hussein	Commander of Fedayeen Saddam	Killed on 22 July 2003
4.	Abid Hamid Mahmud	Presidential Secretary	Executed on 7 June 2012
5.	Ali Hassan al-Majid	Director of IIS	Executed on 25 January 2010
6.	Izzat al-Douri	Vice President of Iraq	Died on 25 October 2020
7.	Hani Abd Latif Tilfah	Director of the SSO	Captured on June 21, 2004
8.	Aziz Saleh al-Numan	Member of the Regional Command	Died in custody in January 2024
9.	Mohammed Hamza Zubeidi	Prime Minister of Iraq	Died in custody on 2 December 2005
10.	Kamal Mustafa Abdullah	Secretary of the Republican Guard	Sentenced to death on 6 June 2011
11.	Barzan Abdul Ghafoor Sulaiman	Commander of the Republican Guard	Released on 29 June 2020
12.	Muzahim Saab Hassan	Air Defense Force Commander	Released in April 2012
13.	Ibrahim Ahmad Abd al-Sattar	Armed Forces Chief of Staff	Died of cancer on 28 October 2010
14.	Saif al-Din al-Rawi	Chief of Staff of the Republican Guard	Believed to be at large
15.	Rafi Abd Latif Tilfah	Director of the Public Security	Believed to be at large
16.	Tahir Jalil Habbush	Director of IIS	Died on 2 April 2026
17.	Hamid Raja Shalah	Air Force Commander	Released in 2007
18.	Latif Nassif Jassim	Deputy chairman of the Ba’ath Party	Died of heart attack on 30 August 2021
19.	Abd al-Tawab Mullah Huwaysh	Deputy Prime Minister of Iraq	Released in 2006
20.	Taha Yassin Ramadan	Vice President of Iraq	Executed on 20 March 2007
21.	Rukan Razuki Abd al-Ghafar	Chief of Tribal Affairs	Killed in 2003
22.	Jamal Mustafa Abdullah	Deputy Chief of Tribal Affairs	Released on 30 June 2020
23.	Mizban Khadr al-Hadi	RCC Member, Reg CDR Central Euphrates Region	Died on 16 May 2020
24.	Taha Muhie-eldin Marouf	Vice President of Iraq	Died of cancer on 9 August 2009
25.	Tariq Aziz	Deputy Prime Minister	Died of heart attack on 5 June 2015
26.	Walid Hamid Tawfiq	Governor of Basrah Governorate	Released on 25 June 2020
27.	Sultan Hashim	Minister of Defense	Died on 19 July 2020
28.	Hikmat Mizban Ibrahim	Dep Prime Minister, Economics & Finance Min.	Died of cancer on 27 January 2012
29.	Mahmud Dhiyab	Minister of the Interior	Released on 9 July 2012
30.	Iyad Futayyih	Al Quds Force Chief of Staff	Died of a stroke on 18 May 2018
31.	Zuhayr Talib Abd al-Sattar al-Naqib	DMI Director	Died on 15 June 2020
32.	Amir Hamudi Hasan al-Sadi	Presidential Scientific Adviser/NMD Dir Gen	Released in 2005
33.	Amer Mohammad Rashid	Presidential Advisor	Died on 17 September 2025
34.	Hossam Mohammed Amin	National Monitoring Director	Died in the UAE on 8 July 2021
35.	Muhammad Mahdi al-Salih	Minister of Trade	Released on 18 March 2012
36.	Sabawi Ibrahim	Head of the Directorate of General Security	Died of cancer on 8 July 2013
37.	Watban Ibrahim	Interior Minister of Iraq	Died on 13 August 2015
38.	Barzan Ibrahim	Presidential Advisor	Executed on 15 January 2007
39.	Huda Salih Mahdi Ammash	Party Youth & Trade Bureau Chairman	Released on 18 December 2005
40.	Abd al-Baqi Abd Karim al-Sadun	BP Chmn & Cmdr BP Militia - Baghdad	Died on 14 December 2021
41.	Muhammad Zimam Abd al-Razzaq	BP Chmn & Cmdr BP Militia - Ta'mim & Ninawa Gov	Sentenced to life imprisonment on 9 April 2009
42.	Samir Abdul Aziz al-Najim	Minister of Oil	Released on 21 April 2023
43.	Humam Abd al-Khaliq Abd al-Ghafur	Min of Higher Education & Scientific Research	Released on 18 December 2005
44.	Yahya Abdallah al-Ubaydi	BP Chmn & Cmdr BP Militia - Basrah Gov.	Killed in 2003
45.	Nayef Shindakh Thamir	BP Chmn & Cmdr BP Militia - Salah ad Din Gov.	Killed in 2003
46.	Sayf al-Din al-Mashhadani	BP Chmn & Cmdr BP Militia - Muthanna Gov.	Killed in Mosul by the Islamic State in 2014
47.	Fadil Mahmud Gharib	BP Chmn & Cmdr BP Militia - Babil/Karbala Gov.	Killed in Mosul by the Islamic State in 2014
48.	Muhsin Khidr al-Khafaji	BP Chmn & Cmdr BP Militia - Qadasiyah Gov.	Died in July 2017
49.	Rashid Taan Kazim	BP Chmn & Cmdr BP Militia - Anbar Governorate	Believed to be at large
50.	Uglah Abid Siqir al-Kubaysi	BP Chmn & Cmdr BP Militia - Maysan Governorate	Released in April 2012
51.	Ghazi Hamoud Al-Obaidi	BP Chmn & Cmdr BP Militia - Wasit Gov.	Died of cancer in April 2007
52.	Adil Abdullah Mahdi Al-Douri	BP Chmn & Cmdr BP Militia - Dhi Qar Governorate	Died on 22 March 2004
53.	Hussein Al-Awadi	BP Chmn & Cmdr BP Militia - Ninawa Governorate	Captured on June 9, 2003
54.	Khamis Sirhan	BP Chmn & Cmdr BP Militia - Karbala Governorate	Died on 11 January 2013
55.	Saad Abdul-Majid	BP Chmn & Cmdr BP Militia - Salah ad Din Gov.	Died on 16 April 2021

== See also ==
- 2003 invasion of Iraq
- Iraqi insurgency (2003–2011)
- 2003 Iraq war timeline
- High-value target
- Most-wanted Iraqi playing cards
- Torture and murder in Iraq
- USA kill or capture strategy in Iraq
- Joint Special Operations Command Task Force in the Iraq War
