= Most-wanted Iraqi playing cards =

US wartime propaganda campaign

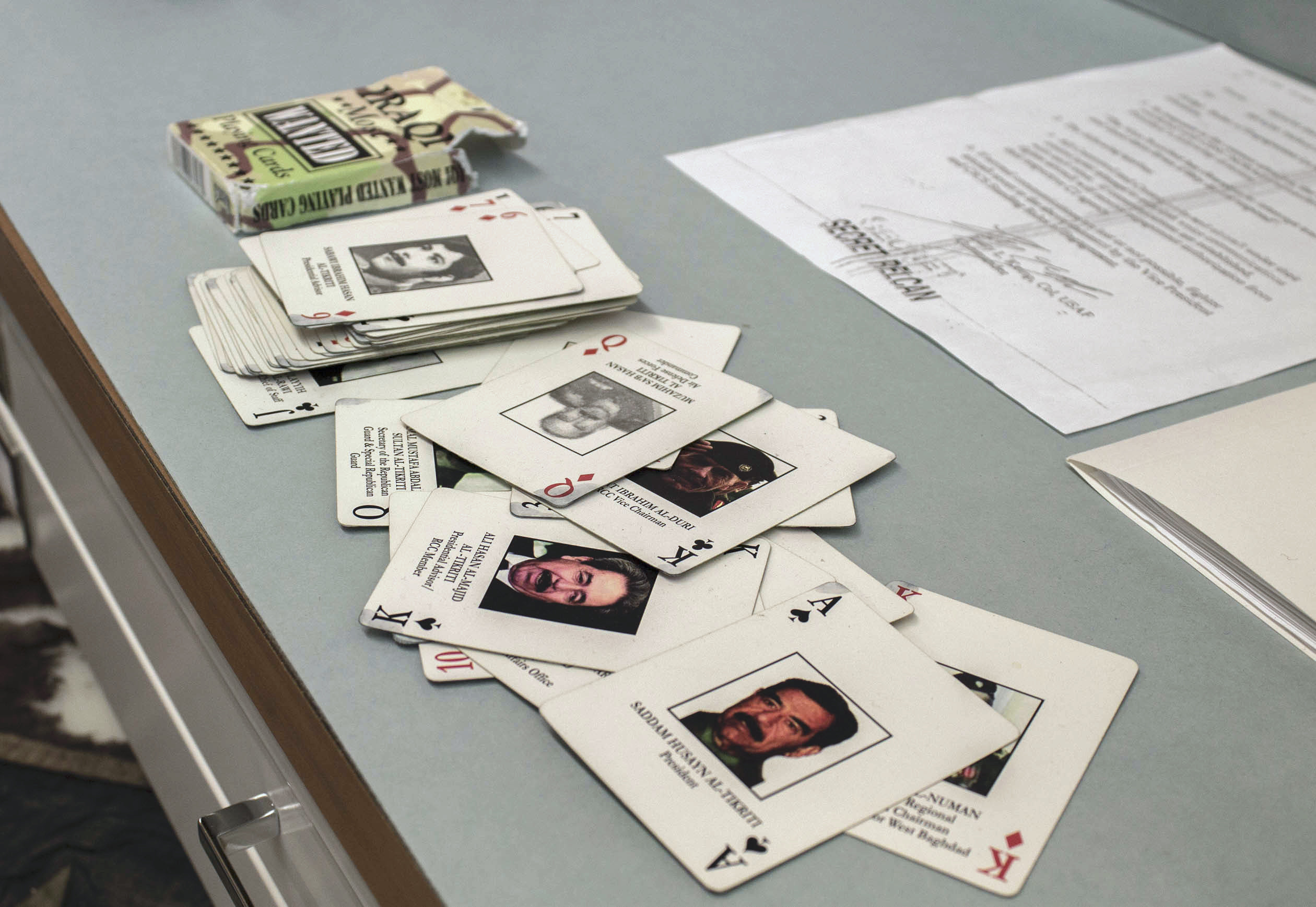
The playing cards

During the 2003 invasion of Iraq by a United States–led coalition, the U.S. Defense Intelligence Agency developed a set of playing cards to help troops identify the most-wanted members of President Saddam Hussein's government, mostly high-ranking members of the Iraqi Regional Branch of the Arab Socialist Ba'ath Party or members of the Revolutionary Command Council; among them were some of Hussein's family members. The cards were officially named the "personality identification playing cards".

As of 18 April 2026, all but three of the 52 most wanted have either died or been captured, ten of whom have been released.

== About the cards ==
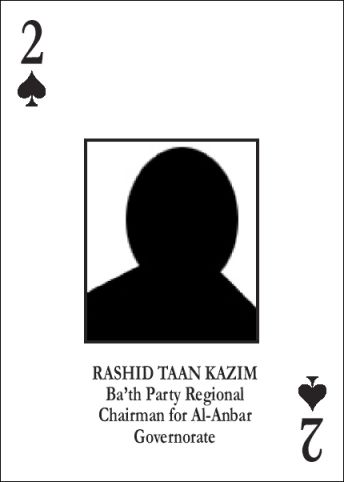
Rashid Taan Kazim playing card

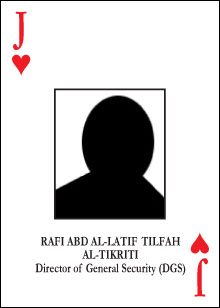
Rafi Abd Latif Tilfah playing card

Each card contains the wanted person's address and, if available, the job performed by that individual. The highest-ranking cards, starting with the aces and kings, were used for the people at the top of the most-wanted list. The ace of spades is Saddam Hussein, the aces of clubs and hearts are his sons Qusay and Uday respectively, and the ace of diamonds is Saddam's presidential secretary Abid Hamid Mahmud al-Tikriti. This strict correspondence to the order of the most-wanted list was not carried through the entire deck, but sometime later in 2003, the list itself was renumbered to conform (almost) to the deck of cards. The card backs feature camouflage reminiscent of that seen on the Desert Camouflage Uniform.

According to US Navy Lieutenant commander Jim Brooks, a spokesman for the Defense Intelligence Agency, such playing cards have been used as far back as the American Civil War and again in World War II—Army Air Corps decks printed with the silhouettes of German and Japanese fighter aircraft fetch hundreds of dollars today—and in the Korean War. Troops often play cards to pass the time, and seeing the names, faces and titles of the wanted Iraqis during their games will help soldiers and Marines in case they run into the wanted individuals in the field, Brooks said.

The list of "Most Wanted" was the result of a multi-intelligence agency collaboration which included the Defense Intelligence Agency, Central Command, and representatives from all US Service Branch Intelligence entities. The "Most Wanted" names were then assigned to their respective cards by five US Army soldiers, 2LT Hans Mumm, SSG Shawn Mahoney, SGT Andrei Salter, SGT Scott Boehmler, and SPC Joseph Barrios, who were assigned to the Defense Intelligence Agency. The pictures used on the cards came from a number of intelligence agencies, but most were derived from "open sources". The deck of cards was first announced publicly in Iraq on 11 April 2003, in a press conference by Army Brig. Gen. Vincent Brooks, deputy director of operations at U.S. Central Command. On that same evening Max Hodges, a Houston-based entrepreneur, found and downloaded a high-resolution artwork file for the deck from a Defense Department web server. Discovering the following day that the file had vanished from the military web server he became the first eBay seller to offer the artwork file, in PDF, which could be used to reproduce the deck. He quickly contracted Gemaco Playing Card Company to print 1,000 decks for about $4,000 and started selling both the decks, in advance of receiving them from the printer, on eBay, Amazon.com and his own web site. When some of his early auctions for a $4 deck of cards quickly rose to over $120, it did not take long for other eBayers to jump on the bandwagon and print or order decks of their own to sell. In just a few days hundreds of sellers materialized and the price dropped to just a few dollars per deck.

The Texas-based Liberty Playing Card Company received an order to manufacture the cards for the U.S. Embassy in Kuwait and by claiming to be "the authorized government contractor" quickly became another popular domestic supplier for the commercial market. The U.S. military inadvertently included in the jokers the trademarked Hoyle joker owned by the United States Playing Card Company of Cincinnati, Ohio.

== List of cards ==
Suit	Card	Person	Pos	Orig	Fate
Spades	Ace ♠	Saddam Hussein; President	1		Captured 13 December 2003; Executed 30 December 2006
Spades	King ♠	Ali Hassan al-Majid (also known as Chemical Ali); Presidential Advisor/RCC Member	5		Captured 21 August 2003; Executed 25 January 2010
Spades	Queen ♠	Muhammad Hamza Zubaydi; Retired RCC member	9	18	Captured 21 April 2003; Died in custody on 2 December 2005
Spades	Jack ♠	Ibrahim Ahmad Abd al-Sattar Muhammad; Iraqi Armed Forces Chief of Staff	13	11	Captured 12 May 2003; Died in custody on 28 October 2010
Spades	10 ♠	Hamid Raja Shalah; Air Force Commander	17	15	Captured 14 June 2003; Released August 2007
Spades	9 ♠	Rukan Razuki Abd al-Ghafar; Head of Tribal Affairs Office	21	39	Killed in 2003
Spades	8 ♠	Tariq Aziz; Deputy prime minister	25	43	Surrendered 24 April 2003 and sentenced to death Died in June 2015
Spades	7 ♠	Mahmud Dhiyab; Minister of interior	29	46	Surrendered 2003; Released in July 2012
Spades	5 ♠	Watban Ibrahim Hassan; Presidential adviser	37	51	Captured 13 April 2003 and sentenced to death Died of natural causes in custody on 13 August 2015
Spades	4 ♠	Muhammad Zimam Abd Al-Razzaq; Ba'ath Party branch command chairman	41	23	Captured 15 February 2004
Spades	3 ♠	Saad Abdul-Majid; Ba'ath Party branch command chairman	45	36	Captured 24 May 2003; Released 18 December 2005; Died on 16 April 2021
Spades	2 ♠	Rashid Taan Kazim; Ba'ath Party regional chairman	49	30	At large as of 2026
Clubs	Ace ♣	Qusay Saddam Hussein; Son of Saddam Hussein	2		Killed in standoff with the U.S. Army in Mosul in July 2003
Clubs	King ♣	Izzat Ibrahim al-Douri; RCC vice chairman	6		Died on 25 October 2020
Clubs	Queen ♣	Kamal Mustafa Abdallah Sultan; Secretary of the Republican Guard	10	8	Surrendered 17 May 2003
Clubs	Jack ♣	Sayf Al-Din Fulayyih Hasan Taha Al-Rawi; Republican Guard chief of staff	14	12	At large as of 2026
Clubs	10 ♣	Latif Nusayyif Jasim; Ba'ath Party military bureau deputy chairman	18	37	Captured 9 June 2003; Died in August 2021
Clubs	9 ♣	Jamal Mustafa Abdullah; Deputy head of tribal affairs	22	40	Surrendered 20 April 2003; Released on 30 June 2020
Clubs	8 ♣	Walid Hamid Tawfiq; Governor of Basra	26	44	Surrendered 29 April 2003; Released on 25 June 2020
Clubs	7 ♣	Ayad Futayyih Khalifa al-Rawi; Quds forces chief of staff	30	20	Captured 4 June 2003; Died in custody on 18 May 2018
Clubs	6 ♣	Husam Muhammad Amin; Head of National Monitoring Directorate	34	49	Captured 27 April 2003; Released 2005; Died on 8 July 2021
Clubs	5 ♣	Barzan Ibrahim Hassan; Presidential adviser	38	52	Captured 17 April 2003; Executed 2007
Clubs	4 ♣	Samir Abd Al-Aziz; Ba'ath Party branch command chairman	42	24	Captured 17 April 2003
Clubs	3 ♣	Sayf al-Din Al-Mashhadani; Ba'ath Party branch command chairman	46	27	Captured 24 May 2003; Killed by ISIS in 2014
Clubs	2 ♣	Ugla Abid Saqr; Ba'ath Party regional chairman	50	31	Captured 20 May 2003; Released 2012
Hearts	Ace ♥	Uday Saddam Hussein; Son of Saddam Hussein	3		Killed in standoff with US Army in Mosul in July 2003
Hearts	King ♥	Hani Abd al-Latif Tilfah; Director—special security organization	7		Captured 21 June 2004
Hearts	Queen ♥	Barzan Abd al-Ghafur Sulayman Majid; Special Republican Guard commander	11	9	Captured 23 July 2003; Released on 29 June 2020
Hearts	Jack ♥	Rafi Abd Al-Latif Tilfah; Director of general security	15	13	At large as of 2026
Hearts	10 ♥	Abd al-Tawab Mullah Huwaysh; Deputy prime minister	19	16	Captured 2 May 2003
Hearts	9 ♥	Mizban Khadr Hadi; RCC member	23	41	Surrendered 9 July 2003; Died in custody on 16 May 2020
Hearts	8 ♥	Sultan Hashim Ahmed; Minister of defense	27	19	Captured 2003, Sentenced to death Died in custody on 19 July 2020
Hearts	7 ♥	Zuhayr Talib Abd Al-Sattar; Director of military intelligence	31	21	Captured 23 April 2003; Died on 15 June 2020
Hearts	6 ♥	Muhammad Mahdi Salih	35	48	Captured 23 April 2003; Released July 2010
Hearts	5 ♥	Huda Salih Mahdi Ammash PhD (Dr. Ammash was derisively called "Mrs. Anthrax" in Western propaganda.); Weapons of mass destruction scientist, the only female on the list	39	53	Captured 7 May 2003; Released 2005
Hearts	4 ♥	Humam Abd al-Khaliq Abd al-Ghafur; Minister of higher education and scientific research	43	54	Captured 19 April 2003; Released 18 December 2005
Hearts	3 ♥	Fadil Mahmud Gharib; Ba'ath Party branch command chairman	47	28	Captured 15 May 2003
Hearts	2 ♥	Ghazi Hammud; Ba'ath Party branch command chairman	51	32	Captured 7 May 2003; Died in 2007
Diamonds	Ace ♦	Abid Hamid Mahmud; Presidential secretary	4		Executed on 7 June 2012
Diamonds	King ♦	Aziz Salih; Ba'ath Party branch command chairman	8	17	Sentenced to death in 2011; Died in January 2024
Diamonds	Queen ♦	Muzahim Sa'b Hassan al-Tikriti; Air defense forces commander	12	10	Captured 23 April 2003; Released in April 2012
Diamonds	Jack ♦	Tahir Jalil Habbush; Iraqi intelligence service	16	14	Died on 2 April 2026
Diamonds	10 ♦	Taha Yassin Ramadan; Vice president/RCC member	20	38	Executed in 2007
Diamonds	9 ♦	Taha Muhyi Al-Din Maruf; Vice president/RCC member	24	42	Captured 2 May 2003; Died in exile in 2009
Diamonds	8 ♦	Hikmat Mizban Ibrahim; Deputy prime minister and finance minister	28	45	Captured 18 April 2003; Died in custody in 2012
Diamonds	7 ♦	Amir Hamudi Hasan; Presidential scientific adviser	32	55	Surrendered 12 April 2003
Diamonds	6 ♦	Sabawi Ibrahim Hassan; Presidential adviser	36	50	Died of cancer in 2013
Diamonds	5 ♦	Abd Al-Baqi Abd Karim Al-Sadun; Ba'ath Party branch command chairman	40	22	Captured in 2015; Sentenced to death in 2016; Died in 2021
Diamonds	4 ♦	Yahya Abdallah al-Ubaydi; Ba'ath Party branch command chairman	44	25	Killed in 2003
Diamonds	3 ♦	Muhsin Khadr; Ba'ath Party branch command chairman	48	29	Captured 7 February 2004; Died in custody in 2017
Diamonds	2 ♦	Adil Abdallah Mahdi; Ba'ath Party branch command chairman	52	33	Captured 15 May 2003; Died of kidney failure on 22 March 2004.

== Other versions ==
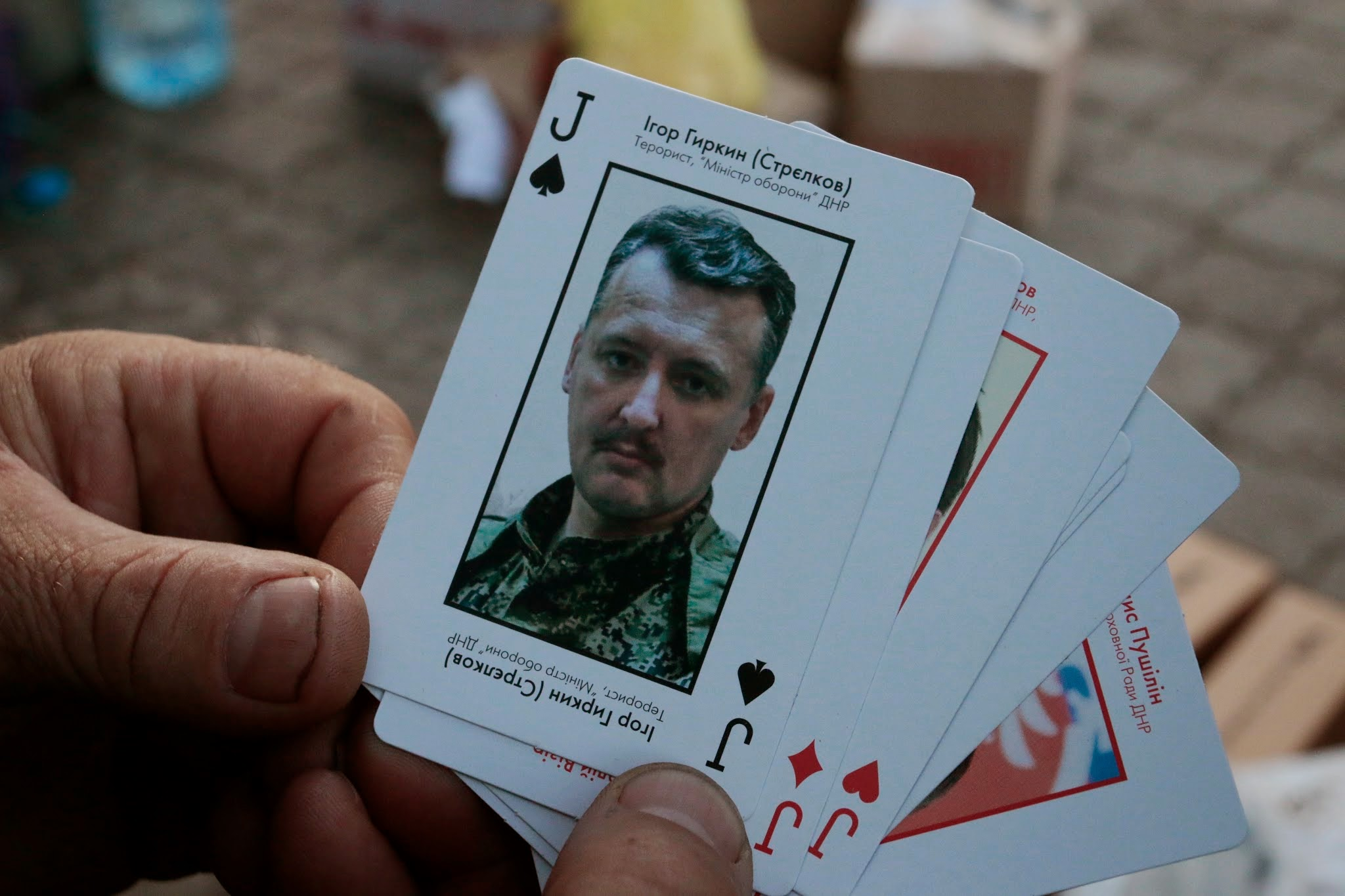
Ukrainian personality identification playing cards with pro-Russian separatist leaders of the war in Donbas, inspired by the American ones from Iraq. This one depicts Igor "Strelkov" Girkin.

The cards also include two jokers: one lists Arab tribal titles, the other Iraqi military ranks. There are no cards for most-wanted No. 45 (was #26), Nayef Shindakh Thamir, No. 53 (was #34 – Killed in 2003 or possibly still fugitive) Hussein Al-Awadi, or No. 54 (was #35) Khamis Sirhan, captured on 11 January 2004. Al-Muhammad was held for six years before being released on 30 July 2010. He fled to Syria where other uncaptured members of the deck of cards were reported to be hiding.

In 2025, amidst a surge in the popularity of the Pokémon Trading Card Game, the Department of Homeland Security released a promotional video that included several Pokémon-style cards of DHS detainees, all of which had a weakness to the "ICE" type. The Pokémon Company denied having given the department permission to do so.

== In media ==
In 2003, the cards were satirized by the British news comedy panel show Have I Got News for You, where guest host Bruce Forsyth conducted a segment entitled "Play Your Iraqi Cards Right" (a spoof of his game show Play Your Cards Right, the British version of Card Sharks) using the deck.

== See also ==
- Hamas most wanted playing cards, similar cards made for Israel during the Gaza war
- Archaeology awareness playing cards
- Desert Storm trading cards
- Manhunt (military)
- Mercenaries (video game) – used a similar playing card scheme for enemy leaders.
