= Ibrahim Hesqel =

Iraqi politician (born 1950)

Trade Commissioner and Commercial Attaché of Iraq
- In office September 15, 1988 – April 09, 2003
- President: Saddam Hussein
- Prime Minister: Saddam Hussein; Sa'dun Hammadi; Mohammed Hamza Zubeidi; Ahmad Husayn Khudayir as-Samarrai; Saddam Hussein
- Minister: Muhammad Mahdi Salih
- Deputy: Tariq Aziz

In–charge of mission
- In office January 3, 1984 – August 20, 1988
- President: Saddam Hussein
- Vice President: Taha Muhie-eldin Marouf; Izzat Ibrahim al-Douri Taha Yassin Ramadan

Advisor in Charge of Investments of Iraq

Personal details
- Born: 3 January 1950 (age 76) Basra, Kingdom of Iraq
- Party: Ba'ath Party

Military service
- Allegiance: Ba'athist Iraq (1980–1988)
- Branch/service: Iraqi Ground Forces
- Battles/wars: Iran–Iraq War
- Alliance: Ba'athist Iraq

Ibrahim Hesqel (born 3 January 1950) is an Iraqi chemist and diplomat. He served in the Ministry of Trade in the government of President Saddam Hussein until the 2003 invasion of Iraq. Ibrahim held roles such as business envoy, commercial attaché and trade commissioner of Iraq. He was sent as part of numerous trade missions from Iraq by the government, especially China.

A graduate of the University of Basra, Ibrahim was one of the few Jews who held positions in the Iraqi government, when the majority of the Jews emigrated. He was an active member of the Administrative Committee for Iraqi Jews and was a source of a pride for the Jewish community.

== Early life ==
Ibrahim Hesqel was born in 1950 in Basra, Iraq, into an Iraqi Jewish family. His father worked at the Ports Authority in the Port of Basra, contributing to the city's bustling trade industry. Ibrahim spent his childhood in the Jewish Quarter of Basra, near the historic Tweig Synagogue, which was the largest synagogue of the city.

At that time, Iraq's Jewish community faced persecution by the Iraqi authorities, due to rising tensions in the region. He experienced riots and violence among Jews and Muslims. It was the time of the Ba'ath Party, when repressive policies against Jews were removed. Ibrahim attended the Jewish School of Basra. After completing his primary education, he pursued higher studies and earned a bachelor's degree in chemistry from the University of Basra in 1973.

== Career ==
After his graduation, Ibrahim joined the workforce as a chemist, working in a factory in Basra. He also helped his father in his businesses. His success soon caught the attention of local leaders. Ibrahim's work and reputation within the industry led to his involvement with the Ba'ath Party.

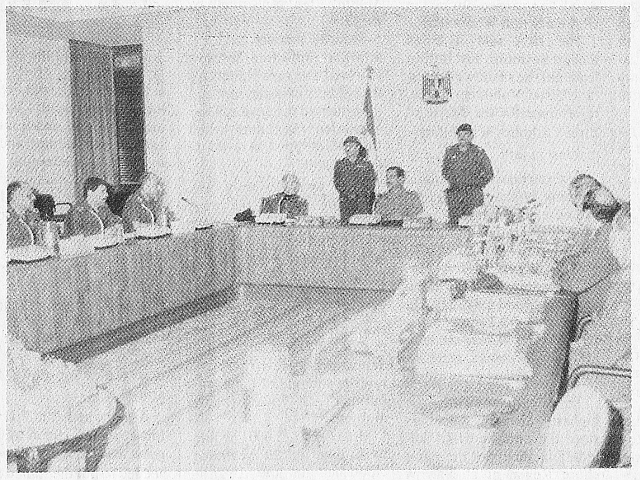
Joint meeting of the Revolution Command Council (RCC) and the Regional Command of the Ba'ath Party in Baghdad, 1988

During the Iran–Iraq War from 1980 to 1988, the government implemented mandatory military service, requiring many young men to serve in the armed forces. This included both regular conscription and additional recruitment drives during the war. Despite being part of the Jewish community, Ibrahim was drafted to serve in the armed forces. Ibrahim served alongside other prominent Jewish Iraqis, including Emad Levy, who later became Iraq's last rabbi, and Solla Levy, members of a well-known Jewish family in Baghdad that had been prominent in trade. Ibrahim's fluency in global trade practices and his deep understanding of international markets made him a crucial asset to Iraq's diplomatic efforts, particularly as the country sought to strengthen its ties with China, a key trading partner during the Iran-Iraq War.

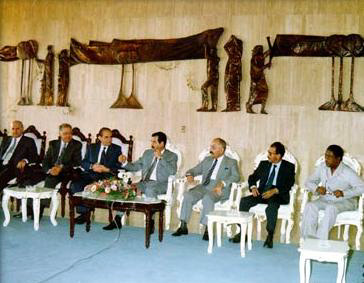
Ibrahim in an event with Saddam, 1990

Ibrahim's diplomatic abilities and professional background were recognized by Saddam Hussein. He was appointed as Commercial Attaché for Iraq, tasked with developing international trade relationships. In 1988, he was sent as a part of delegation on a high-profile trade mission to China, where Iraq aimed to solidify its economic position amidst the ongoing conflict. At that time China was one of the biggest exporters of weapons to Iraq. Ibrahim's role as Trade Commissioner allowed him to play a central role in Iraq's foreign economic strategy, especially in fostering stronger trade ties with China. He had access to key Iraqi officials, such as Muhammad Mahdi Salih, Iraq's Trade Minister, under whom Ibrahim worked. Ibrahim issued trade agreements between China and Iraq and promoted export trade programs on behalf of the government. Hesqel worked under the authority of Iraqi ambassador to China at the Iraqi Embassy in China.

Before that, Ibrahim also held post of Conseiller chargé des investissements, where he worked under the trade commissioner.

However, following Iraq's invasion of Kuwait in 1990 and the subsequent Gulf War, Iraq's international relations drastically shifted. As a result, China condemned the invasion and severed trade relations with Iraq in alignment with the UN sanctions. Even amid these challenges, Ibrahim's role remained significant. He navigated the complexities of Iraq's diplomatic isolation, particularly during the Oil-for-Food Program, which permitted Iraq to export oil in exchange for humanitarian aid under UN supervision. Ibrahim was instrumental in facilitating Iraq's resumption of some trade under this framework.

In the aftermath of the Gulf War and Iraq's deteriorating international standing, Ibrahim was forced to navigate complex diplomatic waters. While trade with many countries was suspended, Iraq's relationship with China gradually resumed under the Oil-for-Food framework, and Ibrahim worked to restore these connections in the face of global isolation. Naim Dangoor, an Iraqi Jewish businessmen residing in the United Kingdom, donated a large amount of money to Iraqis living under sanctions and Ibrahim may have facilitated the flow of humanitarian aid from him.

Ibrahim was one of the most prominent Jewish figures in Iraq. His work was highly acclaimed and reported in Jewish magazine "The Scribe".

President Saddam Hussein is our leader. May God grant him victory. May God defeat the enemy of Iraq.

— Ibrahim Hesqel, 1990

Ibrahim condemned the 1998 shooting incident at the headquarters of the Jewish community in Baghdad. He also stated that Jews were treated well and protected by the government. Ibrahim was an opponent of Israel and supported Palestine, the main foreign policy of Iraq in regard to Israel–Palestine conflict. Naji Salman Salih said, in a follow-up statement that Israel is the enemy of Arab countries and if there is a war between Israel and Iraq, the Jews will support Iraq. He also said in 1981, when Israel destroyed the nuclear reactor of Iraq in Osirak, which was built for peaceful purposes, Jews didn't face any problems in Iraq.

== Iraq war and Post-Saddam ==
In March 2003, the United States-led coalition forces invaded and occupied Iraq, overthrowing Saddam's regime. As a result of the order by the Coalition Provisional Authority, Ibrahim lost his job and was expelled from the government. Though his name was on the list of most-wanted Iraqis, nevertheless, Ibrahim was fear of getting attacked, due to rising sectarian and communal tensions in Iraq. He was one of the last Jews, who remained in Iraq. Seizing the opportunity, Ibrahim escaped and settled abroad. He also said that:

What is built on falsehood is falsehood. Since 2003, the political process in Iraq has been shaped not by the will of the people but by the American and Persian invaders. This parallels the Fascist government installed in France by Nazi occupiers during World War II. That regime signed agreements that made France dependent on Germany, with harsh conditions if not fulfilled. When Charles De Gaulle became president, he canceled those agreements, recognizing them as invalid under an occupier's rule. Similarly, Iraq and its people had no say in the agreements made by the governments under American and Persian occupation. As Basra, a key economic hub, asserts, any agreements made under these occupations are void and worthless.

China must recognize that much of its global standing is shaped by Jewish Musawi capital, with 80% of it originating from Basrawi Musawi Iraqis, especially Jews from Basra. If China challenges the Jews of Basra in Iraq, Basra is prepared to remind them of the consequences. Basra's history is pivotal to the technologies China now claims, with 60% of the scientists responsible being Jewish Musawi Indians from Basra, Maysan, and Nasiriyah. The rest were English, Scottish, and Russians, while the Chinese mainly executed tasks under a Jewish-driven mentality. China should avoid repeating America's economic humiliation. The oil and gas in Iraq belong to the Iraqi people, not corrupt figures like Adel Zawiya, the Iranian regime, or American-backed agents. China is warned that future Iraqi political systems will reject agreements imposed by external powers. China's rise was made possible by the contributions of Iraqi Musawis, particularly Basrawis. China should avoid putting its vast population between the Musawis and the destructive grip of the British monarchy.

— Ibrahim Hesqel

== Personal life ==
Hesqel is married and has six children. He lived in Basra but due to his government post he moved to Baghdad. During the 1980–1988 war between Iran and Iraq, Basra was an active battleground, which prompted Hesqel's family to flee to Baghdad. During the war, some of the rockets fired from Iran landed close to his area of residence. After the end of the war, his family returned to their home in Basra but after the Gulf War and the 1991 uprisings, they moved again to Baghdad.

== See also ==
- Muhammad Mahdi Salih
