= Playing card (disambiguation) =

A playing card is one of a set of cards used for playing games.

Playing card may also refer to:

- The Playing-Card, a quarterly academic journal about playing cards and card games
- Playing Cards (film), an 1896 silent film
- Playing Cards (Unicode block)

== See also ==
- Standard 52-card deck, the most common set of playing cards
- List of traditional card and tile packs
- Playing cards in Unicode
- List of playing-card nicknames
- Archaeology awareness playing cards
- Most-wanted Iraqi playing cards
