= Hamid Yusif Hummadi =

Iraqi academic and politician (1935–2022)

Minister of Culture and Information
- In office 1991–1996
- Preceded by: Latif Nassif Jassim
- Succeeded by: Abdel Ghani Abdel ghafor Alani

Minister of Culture, Tourism, and Antiquities
- In office 1996–2003
- Preceded by: Abdel Ghani Abdel ghafor Alani
- Succeeded by: Latif Nassif Jassim

Personal details
- Born: 1935 Tikrit, Kingdom of Iraq
- Died: 24 May 2022 (aged 87) United Arab Emirates
- Education: University of Baghdad
- Occupation: Academic

Hamid Yusif Hummadi (Arabic: حامد يوسف حمادي; 1935 – 24 May 2022) was an Iraqi politician. He served as Minister of Culture and Information from 1991 to 1996 and Minister of Culture, Tourism, and Antiquities from 1996 to 2003. He died in the United Arab Emirates on 24 May 2022.
