= Abid Hamid Mahmud =

Iraqi military officer (1957–2012)

Abid Hamid Mahmud Al-Tikriti
- عبد حميد محمود

Personal Secretary to the President
- In office 1990–2003
- Appointed by: Saddam Hussein

Director of the Iraqi Special Security Organization
- In office 1992–1997
- Preceded by: Fannar Zibin Al Hasan
- Succeeded by: Nawfal Mahjoom Al-Tikriti

Personal details
- Born: 21 September 1957 Baghdad, Kingdom of Iraq
- Died: 7 June 2012 (aged 54) Baghdad, Iraq
- Cause of death: Execution by hanging
- Party: Ba'ath Party

Military service
- Allegiance: Ba'athist Iraq
- Branch/service: Iraqi Ground Forces
- Years of service: 1980–2003
- Rank: Lieutenant General
- Battles/wars: Iran–Iraq War; Gulf War; 2003 Iraq War

Lieutenant General Abid Hamid Mahmud al-Tikriti (/ˈæbɪd ˈhɑːmɪd mɑːxˈmuːd æl tɪˈkriːti/ AB-id HAH-mid mahkh-MOOD al tik-REE-tee; Arabic: عبد حميد محمود التكريتي) (21 September 1957 – 7 June 2012) was an Iraqi military officer and Saddam Hussein's personal secretary.

== Biography ==
Mahmud began his military career as a non-commissioned officer in the Iraqi Army. He rose through the ranks to Lieutenant-General, becoming part of Saddam Hussein's personal bodyguard detail, and finally, his personal secretary.

A distant cousin of Saddam Hussein, observers regarded Mahmud as being Hussein's right-hand man. He always maintained constant contact with Hussein and acted as a gatekeeper, controlling access to him. He was trusted, along with Saddam's son Qusay Hussein, in overseeing the Iraqi Special Security Organization.

He was designated ace of diamonds in the U.S. administration's most-wanted Iraqi playing cards and fourth on the most-wanted list after Saddam and his sons Uday and Qusay.

He was captured in a joint raid by members of B Squadron Delta Force and G Squadron SAS and the 1st Battalion, 22nd Infantry Regiment of 1st Brigade, 4th Infantry Division, in Tikrit on 16 June 2003. At the time it was recognized as the "greatest success" since the end of major hostilities, and a sign that Saddam Hussein might soon be found.

On 29 April 2008, he appeared before the Iraq Special Tribunal set up by the Iraq Interim Government and stood trial with six others including Tariq Aziz, Ali Hassan al-Majid, Watban Ibrahim al-Hassan and Sabbawi Ibrahim al-Hassan.

On 26 October 2010, he was sentenced to death by the Iraqi High Tribunal after being found guilty of crimes against humanity and genocide for organizing a crackdown against banned political parties in Iraq in the 1980s and 1990s, including assassinations and unlawful detentions.

On 7 June 2012, he was executed by hanging, according to a spokesman of the Iraqi Ministry of Justice.
