= Ayman Sabawi Ibrahim =

Iraqu insurgent, half nephew of Saddam Hussein

- Born: October 21, 1971 (age 54)
- Known for: Member of the Iraqi insurgency
- Parent: Sabawi Ibrahim al-Tikriti
- Relatives: Ibrahim (brother); Barzan (uncle); Watban (uncle); Saddam Hussein (half-uncle)

Ayman Sabawi Ibrahim Hassan (Arabic: أيمن سبعاوي إبراهيم) (born 21 October 1971) is Saddam Hussein's half-nephew and a suspected guerrilla. Ayman's father is Sabawi Ibrahim al-Tikriti, Saddam's half-brother. Ayman was suspected of aiding the Iraqi Insurgency after the 2003 invasion of Iraq by a United States-led coalition. He was arrested in early May 2005 during a raid north of Tikrit.

While serving a life sentence in a northern Iraqi prison, Ayman escaped with the help of a police officer on 9 December 2006.
