= Ibrahim Sabawi Ibrahim =

- Born: October 25, 1983; Baghdad, Iraq
- Died: May 20, 2015 (aged 31); Baiji, Iraq
- Known for: Member of the Iraqi insurgency

Ibrahim Sabawi Ibrahim (Arabic: إبراهيم سبعاوي إبراهيم) (October 25, 1983, Baghdad - May 20, 2015, Baiji) was Saddam Hussein's half-nephew and an Islamic State guerrilla.

Ibrahim's father was Sabawi Ibrahim Hassan al-Tikriti, Saddam's half-brother, the 'Six of Diamonds' in the U.S. military's most-wanted Iraqi playing cards due to his leading Iraqi secret intelligence. Sabawi Ibrahim Hassan al-Tikriti and at least two sons (Ibrahim Sabawi Ibrahim and his older brother, Ayman Sabawi Ibrahim) were captured by Iraqi and coalition forces near Saddam's hometown of Tikrit in February, 2005. Ibrahim Sabawi Ibrahim escaped from a prison near Mosul the following year while serving sentences for illegal weapons possession and the manufacture of explosive devices used in terror attacks. His father died from cancer in a Baghdad hospital in 2013.

== Death ==
Iraqi media, on authority of the Baath party and Islamic State supporters, reported Ibrahim Sabawi Ibrahim having been killed in a battle between Iraqi military forces and Iranian-backed Shiite militias in or near the contested oil refinery at Baiji, Iraq, on May 20, 2015.
