= List of Iraqi Information Ministers =

This is a list of Iraqi Information Ministers during the presidency of Saddam Hussein. The ministry was dissolved in May, 2003 by L. Paul Bremer under CPA Order Number 2.

== Ba'athist Iraq (1968–2003) ==
Name	Term of office		Political party	President
Latif Nassif Jassim	16 July 1979	23 March 1991	Iraqi Ba'ath Party (Iraq Region)	Saddam Hussein
Hamid Yusif Hummadi	1991	1996	Iraqi Ba'ath Party (Iraq Region)	Saddam Hussein
Abd al-Ghani Abd al-Ghafur	1996	1996	Iraqi Ba'ath Party (Iraq Region)	Saddam Hussein
Hamid Yusif Hummadi	1996	1997	Iraqi Ba'ath Party (Iraq Region)	Saddam Hussein
Humam Abd al-Khaliq Abd al-Ghafur	1998	2001	Iraqi Ba'ath Party (Iraq Region)	Saddam Hussein
Muhammad Saeed al-Sahhaf	2001	9 April 2003	Iraqi Ba'ath Party (Iraq Region)	Saddam Hussein
