= Sultan Hashim =

Sultan Hashim may refer to:

- Sultan Hashim Jalilul Alam Aqamaddin (1825–1906), Sultan of Brunei from 1885 to 1906
- Sultan Hashim Ahmad al-Tai (1945–2020), 27th Iraqi Minister of Defense
