= Rukan Razuki Abd al-Ghafar =

Head of the tribal affairs office in Iraq under Saddam Hussein (1956–2003)

Rukan Razuki Abd al-Ghafar Sulayman al-Majid al-Tikriti (Arabic: روكان رزوقي عبد الغفار سليمان الماجد التكريتي; 1956-2003) was the head of the tribal affairs office in Iraq under Saddam Hussein and a member of Saddam's inner circle.

He was #21 on the U.S. list of most-wanted Iraqis (previously #39), and was represented by the "nine of spades" in the U.S. deck of most-wanted Iraqi playing cards that were printed to accompany the list.

Al-Ghafar was killed in an airstrike in 2003.
