= Omar al-Tikriti =

Iraqi fugitive (born c. 1979)

Omar al-Tikriti (Arabic: عمر التكريتي, born c. 1979) is the son of Dehyaa Ali Hussien, and second nephew of Saddam Hussien. Sabawi Ibrahim al-Tikriti, He is a graduate of Baghdad College, in Baghdad, Iraq.

== Biography ==
In July 2005, the United States Treasury Department blocked his assets, as well as those of his brothers Yasir Al-Tikriti, Ayman Al-Tikriti, Ibrahim Al-Tikriti, Bashar Al-Tikriti, and Sa’ad Al-Tikriti, in the United States due to his ties with the Ba'ath Party.

On 17 November 2005, Iraqi Attorney General Chathanfar Hmod Al-Jasim presented Interpol with an extradition request to bring Saddam Hussein's nephew from Yemen back to Baghdad to stand trial for “committing acts of terror".
