= Fadil Mahmud Gharib =

Iraqi Baath member

Fadhil Mahmoud Gharib Al-Mashhadani فاضل محمود غريب المشهداني

Personal details
- Born: 1944 (age 81–82) Dujail, Kingdom of Iraq
- Party: Ba'ath Party

Military service
- Allegiance: Ba'athist Iraq
- Branch/service: Iraqi Army
- Battles/wars: Iran–Iraq War; Gulf War; 2003 Iraq War

Fadhil Mahmoud Gharib Al-Mashhadani or Fadhil Mahmoud Gharib Al-Mashaikhi (born in Al-Dujail in 1944) is an Iraqi politician, a member of the Regional Leadership of the Arab Socialist Ba'ath Party, and a former governor of Babil and Karbala provinces. He was also the head of the party's organizations in Babil province and the president of the Federation of Trade Unions in Iraq.

He served as a member of the Board of Directors of the Arab Labor Organization from March 1983 to March 1987, and later as an alternate member from March 1996 to March 1998.

His name appeared on the list of Iraqis wanted by the United States and was included in the deck of playing cards featuring the most wanted Iraqis. He was arrested on May 15, 2003, and released on December 18, 2005. He then moved to Syria and continued his political activities with the party.

In 2017, the Iraqi Parliament passed a law confiscating the movable and immovable assets of Saddam Hussein, his wives, children, grandchildren, relatives up to the second degree, and their agents, as well as the assets of 52 key figures from the former regime, including Fadhil Mahmoud Gharib.

He currently resides in Malaysia, despite claims that ISIS executed him after they took over Mosul in 2014.
