= Sayf al-Din al-Mashhadani =

Iraqi Ba'ath Party politician

- سيف الدين المشهداني
- Al-Mashhadani in a 1990s Iraqi television broadcast
- Born: 1956; Baghdad, Iraq
- Died: 2014 (aged 57–58)
- Occupation: Politician
- Known for: U.S. most-wanted list (No. 46)
- Political party: Ba'ath Party (Iraq Region)

Sayf al-Din Mahmoud Ahmed al-Mashhadani (Arabic: سيف الدين محمود أحمد المشهداني; also written Saif-al-Din Al-Mashhadani; 1956 – 2014) was an Iraqi politician and senior member of the Ba'ath Party's Iraqi Regional Branch. He headed the party's organization in Al-Muthanna under Saddam Hussein. During the 2003 invasion of Iraq, he was number 46 on the U.S. list of most-wanted Iraqis and appeared as the three of clubs in the most-wanted Iraqi playing cards.

Captured by coalition forces on 24 May 2003, al-Mashhadani spent about ten years in custody before his release in 2013. The Islamic State detained him in Mosul in 2014. Later reports said that the group killed him, although a Ba'ath Party spokesman initially said that the execution reports were unconfirmed.

== Early life and party career ==
Al-Mashhadani was born in Baghdad in 1956. He served as head of the Iraqi Students and Youth Union and held a series of party positions before joining the Iraqi regional leadership and becoming secretary of its Al-Muthanna organization. United States and United Nations records identified his position as "Ba'th Party Regional Command Chairman, Al-Muthanna".

== Capture and sanctions ==
Coalition forces captured al-Mashhadani on 24 May 2003. The U.S. announcement on 27 May also reported the capture of Sa'd Abd al-Majid al-Faysal, the party's regional chairman for Salah al-Din.

On 24 June 2003, the U.S. Treasury added al-Mashhadani and the other former officials on the 55-person wanted list to its Specially Designated Nationals list. The designation froze assets under U.S. jurisdiction and prohibited transactions with U.S. persons. The United Nations listed him three days later under the asset-freezing provisions of Security Council Resolution 1483.

== Imprisonment and release ==
Alsumaria later reported that the Iraqi High Criminal Court acquitted al-Mashhadani in early July 2010. His release was announced on 3 February 2013 by Ba'ath Party spokesman Khudair al-Murshidi, who said that he had spent ten years in prison. (Note: Alsumaria dates the acquittal to early July 2010, whereas the release announcement is dated 3 February 2013. Neither report explains the intervening period.)

After his release, al-Mashhadani was based for much of his time in Iraqi Kurdistan. By 2014, reports described him as deputy secretary of the party's Iraqi branch.

== Islamic State detention and death ==
On 9 July 2014, Alsumaria, citing Reuters, quoted Nineveh governor Atheel al-Nujaifi as saying that the Islamic State had detained al-Mashhadani in Mosul during a roundup of former military officers and Ba'ath Party members. The Guardian subsequently reported that he and his cousin Fadhil were among the prisoners.

On 18 November 2014, Erem News summarized media reports saying that the Islamic State had killed al-Mashhadani and other Ba'athists. In the same report, al-Murshidi said that the party had no information confirming or refuting the executions; he said that al-Mashhadani and the others had been abducted about three months earlier. A later Agence France-Presse retrospective published by Rudaw in April 2018 stated that the Islamic State executed him in Mosul in 2014, but gave no exact date.
