= Saad Abdul-Majid =

Iraqi politician (1944–2021)

- سعد عبد المجيد الفيصل
- Abdul-Majid in 2001

Personal details
- Born: Saad Abdul-Majid Faisal Yassin Al-Nassiri Al-Tikriti; 1944
- Died: 15 April 2021 (aged 76–77); Jordan
- Party: Iraqi Regional Branch of the Arab Socialist Ba'ath Party

Saad Abdul-Majid (Arabic: سعد عبد المجيد الفيصل; 1944 – 15 April 2021) was an Iraqi politician and diplomat, and one of the most prominent Iraqi leaders during the Ba'ath Party regime. He was one of the officers who led the military coup in 1968 that brought the Ba'ath Party to power.

== After the 2003 U.S. invasion ==
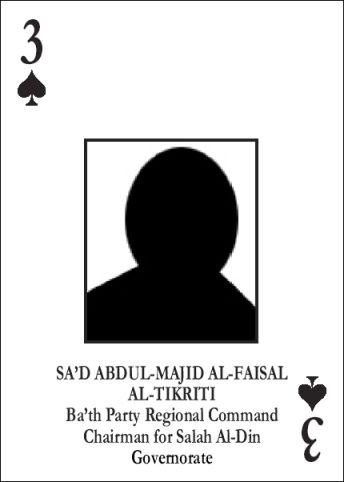
Abdul-Majid's most-wanted Iraqi playing card

The American occupation forces put him on the list of the 55 most wanted Iraqis, as he held several positions, most of them in the diplomatic corps and party work. In the national leadership, director of the office of the secretariat of the National Command, and head of the Expatriates Authority.

His last position was the official of the Ba'ath Party office in Salah al-Din Governorate. He was arrested on 24 May 2003, and released on 18 December 2005. He left Iraq after his release.

In April 2017, the Iraqi Parliament approved a law which confiscated all property; including close family members and relatives up to the second generation; and funds from those listed in the most wanted Iraqis list, including Abdul-Majid.

== Death ==
He died on 15 April 2021 in Jordan from a terminal illness.
