= China–Iraq relations =

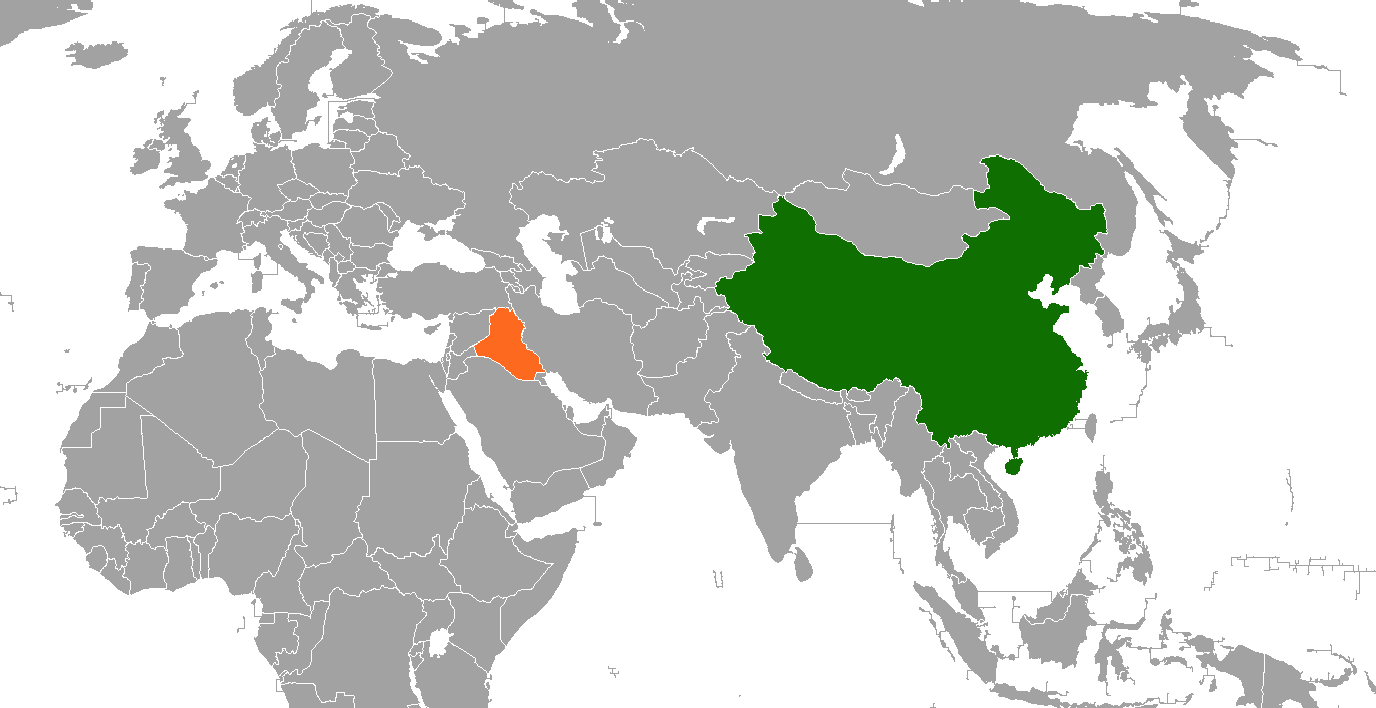
- China: Iraq

China–Iraq relations is the bilateral relationship between Iraq and the People's Republic of China. The two countries signed a strategic partnership in 2015. Iraq is a major destination for Chinese investment in the Middle East and China is the biggest buyer of Iraqi oil. According to industry figures, over a third of Iraq's proven oil and gas reserves and over two-thirds of its current production are managed by Chinese companies as of 2024.

== History ==
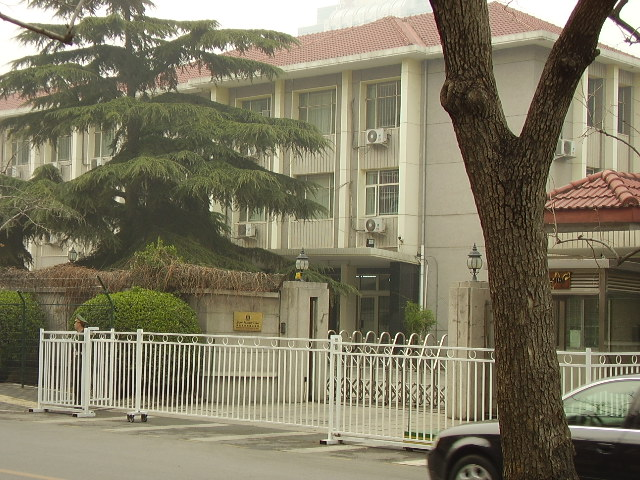
Embassy of Iraq in China

=== Republic of China ===
Chinese Muslims fought against Japan in World War II. In order to gain backing for the Republic of China in Muslim countries, Egypt, Syria, and Turkey was visited by Hui Muslim 馬賦良 Ma Fuliang and Uyghur Muslim Isa Yusuf Alptekin in 1939. The Hindu leaders Tagore and Gandhi and Muslim Jinnah both discussed the war with the Chinese Muslim delegation under Ma Fuliang while in Turkey İsmet İnönü met with the Chinese Muslim delegation. Newspapers in Republican China reported the visit. Ma Fuliang and Isa were working for Zhu Jiahua.

The bombardment of Chinese Muslims by the warplanes of the Japanese was reported in the newspapers of Syria. Afghanistan, Iran, Iraq, Syria, and Lebanon were all toured by the delegation. The Foreign Minister, Prime Minister, and President of Turkey met with the Chinese Muslim delegation after they came via Egypt in May 1939. Gandhi and Jinnah met with the Hui Ma Fuliang and Uyghur Isa Alptekin as they denounced Japan.

Ma Fuliang, Isa Alptekin, Wang Zengshan, Xue Wenbo, and Lin Zhongming all went to Egypt to denounce Japan in front of the Arab and Islamic words.

=== People's Republic of China ===
Relations between Iraq and the People's Republic of China were established after the revolution of 1958 which overthrew the monarchy and established a republic. Relations between the two countries were formally established on August 25, 1958. China viewed the First Republic of Iraq and Abdul-Karim Qasim favorably, especially as China's relations with the United Arab Republic deteriorated. Relations between China and the First Republic of Iraq declined after Qasim began suppressing communists.

During the 1960s relations between the two countries were strengthened as Iraq had purchased many Soviet and Chinese weapons during the Six-Day War and the Yom Kippur War with Israel. But also during this time there was chaos because the Iraqi government had gone through several military coups and attempted coups. In 1971 Iraq supported China's bid for a permanent seat in the United Nations and it voted in favour to admit Beijing and replace Taipei. During the Iran–Iraq War from 1980 to 1988 China was one of the main suppliers to all sides in the war. In fact, China had played both sides during the war and had sent arms to both Iran and Iraq. In 1988, a trade mission headed by Ibrahim Hesqel was sent by Saddam Hussein to China, who served as the trade envoy.

During the Persian Gulf War of 1991 China had condemned Iraq's invasion of Kuwait and had strongly supported the military action by the Coalition. But after the Gulf War China was found by American officials to have violated the United Nations Resolutions on the Gulf War and that China was beginning to rearm Iraq.

==== Recent history ====
China had strongly opposed the 2003 Iraq War and along with France, Germany and Russia had strongly condemned the invasion and occupation and had called for a withdrawal of all forces from the country. All four countries united against the United States and the United Kingdom and had refused to contribute any troops to Iraq unless there was a United Nations mandate. Despite the opposition to the U.S. invasion and occupation of the country China emerged as one of the biggest winners of Iraq's oil contracts. Chinese and Russian companies had emerged as the biggest winners in the bid for Iraq's oil. Chinese companies were willing to operate on 20 year fee based contracts, which offered lower profit margins than Western companies desired.

In 2008, China's CNPC has become the first foreign company to sign an oil production deal with the Iraqi government since the 2003 U.S.-led invasion. The deal sets new terms for an agreement reached between China and Iraq under Saddam Hussein in 1997. In 2009, CNPC partnered with BP, winning a service contract to develop Iraq's Rumaila oil field, the largest oilfield in Iraq.

In 2013 China bought nearly half of Iraqi oil production, nearly 1.5 million barrels a day.

China and Iraq signed a strategic partnership in 2015. Iraq also joined the Belt and Road Initiative that year.

In 2015, Iraq imported armed drone technology from China, spurred on battlefield reversals in Mosul and Ramadi to ISIL.

In July 2019, UN ambassadors from 50 countries, including Iraq, signed a joint letter to the UNHRC defending China's treatment of Uyghurs and other Muslim minority groups in the Xinjiang region.

In June 2020, Iraq was one of 53 countries that backed the Hong Kong national security law at the United Nations.

In 2021, China signed a deal to build 1,000 schools in Iraq in exchange for Iraqi oil. Iraq was the top target for China's Belt and Road initiative in 2021, receiving $10.5 billion in financing for projects.

On January 2, 2025, a $4.56 billion oil pipeline project connecting Basrah and Haditha was approved to be developed in a joint venture with state-backed Basra Oil Company and Iraqi Oil Projects Company.

== Resident diplomatic missions ==
- China has an embassy in Baghdad and consulates-general in Basra and Erbil.
- Iraq has an embassy in Beijing and a consulate-general in Guangzhou.

== See also ==
- Gerald Bull
- Oil-for-Food Programme
- Foreign relations of Iraq
- Foreign relations of the People's Republic of China
