= Chargé de mission =

A chargé de mission (French pronunciation: [ʃaʁʒe d(ə) misjɔ̃]; French for "in charge of mission") is the title of a class of diplomatic envoy. This type of post is created by an embassy to undertake a specific diplomatic project abroad on behalf of a head of mission or the government. Most often, the project is economic or humanitarian in nature.

== France ==
In France, a chargé de mission can also be a civil servant tasked with a particular matter within an administration.

== See also ==
- Attaché
- Conseiller chargé des investissements

== Sources ==
- UNESCO Chargé de mission
