= Amir Hamudi Hasan al-Sadi =

Iraqi weapons expert (born 1938)

Amer al-Sadi
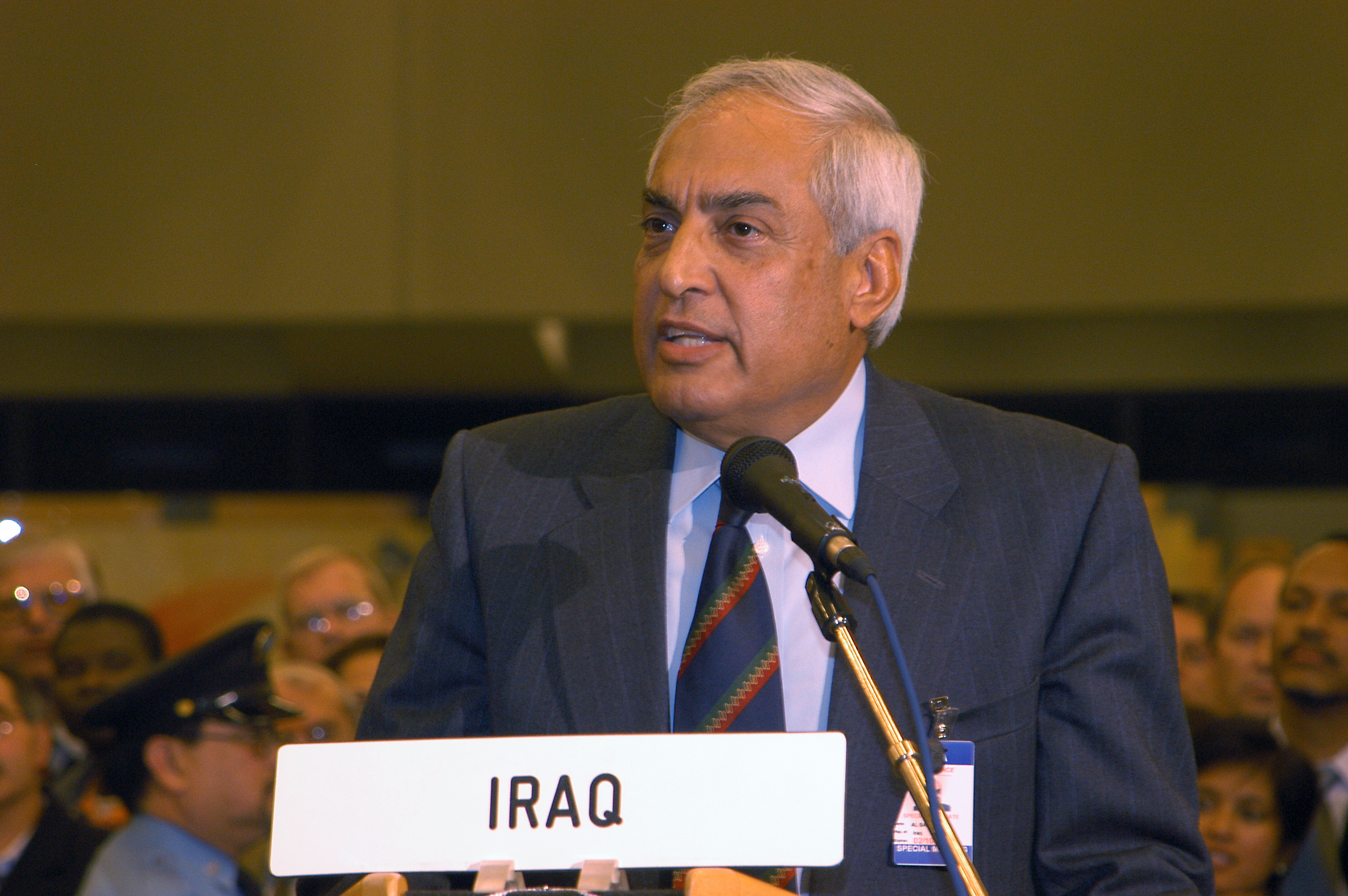
- Al-Sadi at a press conference on the practical arrangements for the return of UN weapons inspectors to Iraq (1 October 2002)

Minister of Industry
- In office 6 April 1991 – 5 September 1993
- Preceded by: Hussein Kamel al-Majid
- Succeeded by: Hussein Kamel al-Majid

Personal details
- Born: 5 April 1938 (age 88) Baghdad, Iraq
- Occupation: Chemist, politician

Amir Hamudi Hasan al-Saadi (Arabic: عامر حمودي حسن السعدي) or Amer al-Sadi (born April 5, 1938), "the organizational genius behind the Iraqi superweapons program," was Saddam Hussein's liaison with the UN inspectors in the runup to the 2003 invasion of Iraq. Like the defector Hussein Kamel al-Majid, he insisted Iraq had destroyed its prohibited weapons. He was dismissed by the US as a liar. There was a subsequent failure to uncover weapons of mass destruction by the Iraqi Survey Group.

He was #32 on the most-wanted list, and "Seven of Diamonds" in the US deck of most-wanted Iraqi playing cards.

== Detainment ==
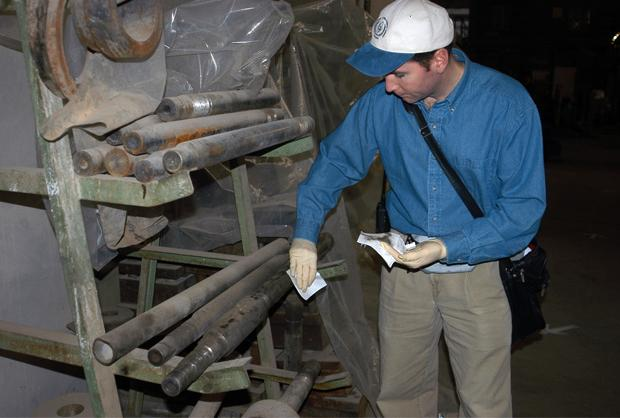
A UN weapons inspector in Iraq

He turned himself in to coalition forces on April 12, 2003, with the help of ZDF journalists who he asked to monitor and document his surrender. He was detained in Baghdad International Airport as a "High Value Detainee". As such he has been subjected to solitary confinement for 23 hours a day. The International Committee of the Red Cross stated in its confidential report to the coalition authority that this constituted a "serious violation of the Third and Fourth Geneva Conventions". He was both the first person on the most wanted list to turn himself in, and the first to be detained by the U.S.

According to a written Parliamentary answer by Dennis Mcshane MP to Angus Robertson MP, Amer Al Saadi was released by the US on 18 January 2005. However, as detailed here, this claim is highly dubious. A June 20, 2005 Newsweek article reported that a "State Department official...denied al-Sadi had been freed from custody."

== Career ==
He was awarded a PhD is in physical chemistry from Battersea College of Technology. During his study he married a German, Hilma, in London in October 1963; their common language is English. Mrs al-Saadi raised their children in Hamburg.

He retired as lieutenant general in 1994 and was made a presidential scientific advisor. His friend Ala Bashir mentioned that al-Sadi was totally paralyzed and hosted in Qatar. In 2017, the Iraqi Council of Representatives included him among those whose tangible and intangible assets were to be confiscated.
