= Muhsin Khidr al-Khafaji =

Iraqi politician (1945–2017)

Muhsin Khidr al-Khafaji (1945 - July 2017) was an Iraqi politician.

== Biography ==
Until 2003, he was chairman of the Baath Party in Al-Qādisiyyah Governorate. In the 2003 invasion of Iraq, he was number 48 on the list of U.S. list of most-wanted Iraqis.
