= Abd al-Tawab Mullah Huwaysh =

Iraqi politician (born 1942)

Deputy Prime Minister of Iraq
- In office 8 July 2001 – 9 April 2003

Minister for Military Industry
- In office 17 April 2001 – 9 April 2003

Personal details
- Born: between 1942–1957 Fallujah, Iraq
- Party: Ba'ath Party
- Children: Hassan Huwaysh

Abd al-Tawab Mullah Huwaysh (Arabic: عبدالتواب الملا حويش; born 1942 or 1957), also known as Abdul Tawab Mullah Hwaish, is a former Iraqi politician and member of the Arab Socialist Ba'ath Party, and served as Deputy Prime minister and Minister of military industrialization until the occupation of Iraq in 2003.

== Career ==
He was on the list of Iraqis most wanted by the United States as the "ten of hearts". He was arrested by an American force that carried out an airdrop on his house in Al-Adhamiya district in Baghdad on 2 May 2003. He was released in 2006.

He is currently believed to reside in Qatar.
