= Adil Abdullah Mahdi Al-Douri =

Iraqi politician

- عادل عبد الله مهدي الدوري التكريتي

Personal details
- Born: Adil Abdullah Mahdi Al-Douri; 1945
- Died: 22 March 2004 (aged 59)
- Party: Iraqi Regional Branch of the Arab Socialist Ba'ath Party

Adil Abdullah Mahdi Al-Douri (Arabic: عادل عبد الله مهدي الدوري; 1945 – 22 March 2004) was an Iraqi politician and a member of the regional leadership of the Arab Socialist Ba'ath Party, and was responsible for the organizations of Dhi Qar Governorate. He was born in 1945 in Al-Dour.

Prior to that, he held the position of secretary of the leadership of the Fallujah branch of the Arab Socialist Ba'ath Party, and was a member of the Iraqi National Council.

== After the 2003 invasion ==
His name was included in the list of Iraqis most wanted by the United States. He was the "two of diamonds" in the US deck of most-wanted Iraqi playing cards.

He was arrested on May 15, 2003, in the city of Tikrit of Al-Dour.

== Death ==
He died on March 22, 2004, in Al-Dour Hospital, after the US occupation forces transferred him due to kidney failure a month before his death.
