= Aziz Saleh Al-Numan =

Iraqi politician (1941–2024)

Aziz Saleh al-Numan
- عزيز صالح النومان

Member of the Regional Command of the Iraqi Regional Branch
- In office 1994 – 9 April 2003

Personal details
- Born: 1 July 1941 Nasiriyah, Iraq
- Died: 30 January 2024 (aged 82) Abu Ghraib, Iraq
- Party: Iraqi Regional Branch of the Arab Socialist Ba'ath Party

Aziz Saleh al-Numan al-Khafaji (Arabic: عزيز صالح النومان الخفاجي; 1 July 1941 – 30 January 2024) was an Iraqi Ba'ath Party Regional Command Chairman. He was appointed Iraqi Governor of Kuwait by Saddam Hussein during the 1991 Gulf War; taking over the post from Ali Hassan al-Majid in November 1990, and holding it until 27 February 1991. He previously served as Governor of Karbala (1976–1979), Governor of Najaf (1979–1986) and Minister of Agriculture (1986–1991).

== Biography ==
Aziz Saleh al-Numan was born on 1 July 1941. He was a member of the "dirty dozen", allegedly responsible for torture and murder in Iraq. Prior to the U.S. invasion in April 2003, Al-Numan was the Baath Party's regional command chair, responsible for West Baghdad. He was previously the governor of Karbala and Najaf.

He was taken into custody on 22 May 2003. At the time, he was the Number 8 on the Central Command's list of the 55 most wanted Iraqis, and was the highest-ranking person on the list of 55 to have been taken into custody to that time. He was one of nine Iraqi leaders that the United States wished to see tried for either war crimes or crimes against humanity.

In 2011, he was transferred to Iraqi custody along with five others, tried and sentenced to death.

Al-Numan was the" King of Diamonds" in the US deck of most-wanted Iraqi playing cards.

He died on 30 January 2024, at the age of 82.
