= Yahya Abdallah al-Ubaydi =

Iraqi politician

- يحيى عبد الله العبودي

Personal details
- Born: Yahya Abdallah al-Ubaydi
- Party: Iraqi Regional Branch of the Arab Socialist Ba'ath Party

Yahya Abdallah al-Ubaydi (Arabic: يحيى عبد الله العبودي) was an Iraqi politician and leader of the Arab Socialist Ba'ath Party. He was responsible for the organizations of Basra province.

== After the 2003 invasion ==
His name was included in the list of Iraqis wanted by the United States, and appeared as the "four of diamonds" in the US deck of most-wanted Iraqi playing cards. He is believed to have been killed during the invasion of Iraq.

In 2017, the Iraqi Council of Representatives passed a law providing for the confiscation of movable and immovable funds for each of Saddam Hussein, his wives, children, grandchildren, relatives up to the second degree and their agents, and the confiscation of existing funds from 52 members of the former regime, among whom was Yahya Abdullah al-Aboudi.
