= Trade commissioner =

Official who promotes foreign trade abroad

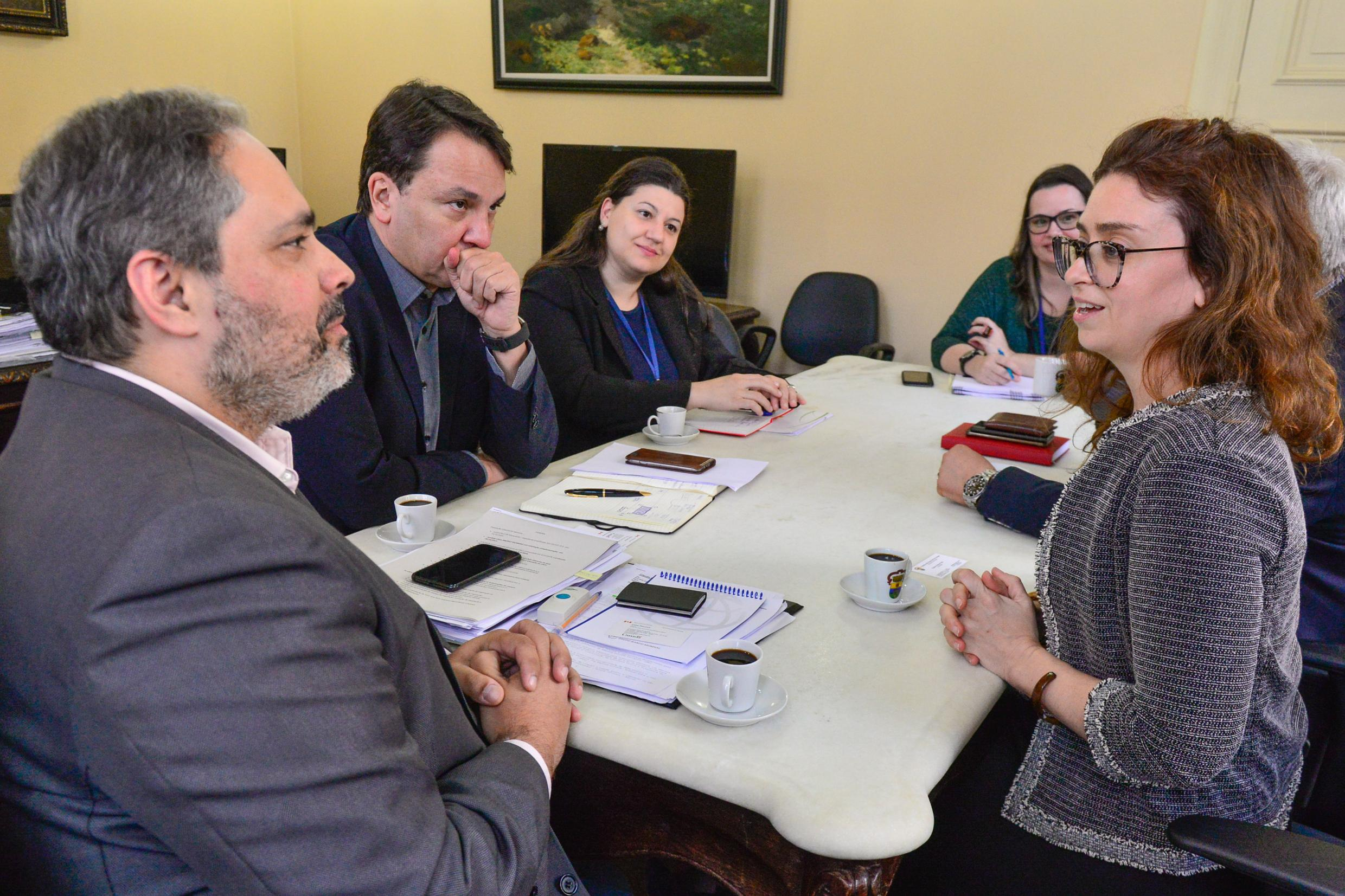
Vice-Mayor Gustavo Paim leds a meeting with Paulo Barnewitz Orlandi, Trade Commissioner Representative, and Elise Racicot, Commercial Consul of the Canadian Consulate in São Paulo, in Porto Alegre, Brazil

Trade commissioner is the title of a government official whose primary duties are to promote international trade agreements and export trade programs on behalf of a national or regional government authority. Such envoys are normally posted abroad, often being permanently resident in the country or region to which they have been assigned, but in some cases are locally engaged employees. If assigned by an authority or organization lacking sovereignty, or if a local employee, a trade commissioner may not enjoy diplomatic status. The title Trade Commissioner is also used by some international organizations for the senior official responsible for trade.

== Countries with trade commissioners ==
=== Australia ===
The Australian Trade and Investment Commission (Austrade) has 80 global offices, employing diplomatically accredited Trade Commissioners and large teams of highly experienced local staff.

=== Brazil ===
The Brazilian Trade Promotion and Investment Sector (SECOM) employs both Brazilian citizens and foreign nationals with this title.

=== Canada ===
The Canadian Trade Commissioner Service has over 160 offices in Canada and abroad, employing both Canadian citizens and foreign nationals with this title.

== International organizations with trade commissioners ==
The following international organizations have commissioners for trade and related issues:

- The Economic Community of West African States has a Commissioner of Trade, Customs and Free Movement
- The EUCLID (Euclid University) has a Commissioner for Economic Development and Trade Diplomacy.
- The European Union's senior official for international trade is the European Commissioner for Trade.
- The Pacific Islands Forum Secretariat posts trade commissioners to Tokyo, Japan; Sydney, Australia; Auckland, New Zealand; and Beijing, China.

== See also ==
- Commissioner
- Conseiller chargé des investissements
