= Samir Abdul Aziz al-Najim =

Iraqi politician

Samir Abdul Aziz al-Najim (Arabic: سمير عبد العزيز النجم; born 1937 in Baghdad) is a former Iraqi politician, who held several senior positions under President Saddam Hussein. He was the Minister for Oil from January to April 2003 and the President's chief of staff for several years after the 1991 Gulf War. He also served as the Iraqi ambassador to Egypt, Turkey, Spain and Russia.

== Biography ==
He was born in 1937 in Baghdad from a Sunni Arab background. al-Najim was the regional command chairman for the Arab Socialist Ba'ath Party for East Baghdad. He was accused by US Army officers of helping Saddam Hussein plot assassination attempts He was convicted in 1959 of the attempted assassination of Prime Minister Abd al-Karim Qasim and was sentenced to death, although Qassim pardoned Najim.

Following the invasion of Iraq by the United States and allied forces in 2003, he was depicted as the four of clubs in their deck of most-wanted Iraqi playing cards. His assets were frozen under United Nations Security Council Resolution 1483 as a "senior official" and transferred to the Development Fund for Iraq.

He was captured by Kurdish peshmerga near Mosul in April 2003. He was held at a prison located in Kadhimiya Region. He was sentenced to life imprisonment and confiscation of all his property on October 26, 2016. He was released from prison in April 2023.
