= Kamal Mustafa Abdullah =

Iraqi general (born 1952)

Kamal Mustafa Abdullah Sultan
- كمال مصطفى عبد الله السلطان
- Born: 1952 (age 73–74); Tikrit, Iraq
- Military career
- Allegiance: Ba'athist Iraq
- Commands: Republican Guard
- Conflicts: 1991 uprisings in Iraq

Kamal Mustafa Abdullah Sultan al-Tikriti (Arabic: كمال مصطفى عبد الله السلطان; born 1952) was the Secretary General of the Republican Guard under the rule of Saddam Hussein. He was taken into custody on 17 May 2003. His brother, Jamal Mustafa Abdullah, was Saddam Hussein's son-in-law.

He was the "Queen of Clubs", in the U.S. deck of most-wanted Iraqi playing cards.

On 6 June 2011, Abdullah was sentenced to death for his role in the violent repression of a Shiite uprising in 1991.
