= Saif Al-Din Al-Rawi =

Iraqi former Commander

- سيف الدين الراوي
- Born: Saif al-Din Fulayyih Hassan Taha al-Rawi; 1949 (age 76–77); Rawa, Al Anbar Governorate, Kingdom of Iraq
- Military career
- Allegiance: Ba'athist Iraq
- Commands: Chief of Staff

Saif Al-Din Al-Rawi (Arabic: سيف الدين الراوي; born 1949) is an Iraqi military officer and was the commander of the Republican Guard under the rule of Saddam Hussein. He was the "Jack of Clubs" in the U.S. deck of most-wanted Iraqi playing cards. He was 14th of the 55 wanted.

Saif Al-Din is still at large.
