= Hamid Raja Shalah =

Former Iraqi commander

Hamid Raja Shalah حامد رجا شلاح
- Born: 1950 (age 75–76); Baiji, Salah al-Din, Iraq
- Military career
- Allegiance: Iraq
- Branch: Iraqi Air Force
- Rank: Air marshal
- Commands: Iraqi Air Force
- Conflicts: Iran–Iraq War; Persian Gulf War; Iraq War (surrendered)

Hamid Raja Shalah (Arabic: حامد رجا شلاح), also known as Hamid Raja-Shalah Hassan al-Tikriti or Hamid Raja-Shalah Hassum al-Tikriti (born 1950) is a former commander of the Iraqi Air Force under Saddam Hussein.

== Career ==
During Shalah's air force career, he served as a pilot. In the 1980s, during the Iran–Iraq War, Shalah commanded several air bases, including the Kirkuk air base. He rose to three-star rank and was appointed Commander-in-chief of the Iraqi Air Force in the mid-1990s.

He was reported by the United States Central Command to be in coalition custody on June 14, 2003. Prior to his capture, Shalah was number 17 (ten of spades) in the U.S. deck of most-wanted Iraqi playing cards.

He was held as a prisoner of war until his release in 2007.
