= Archaeology awareness playing cards =

Educational playing cards issued to American military

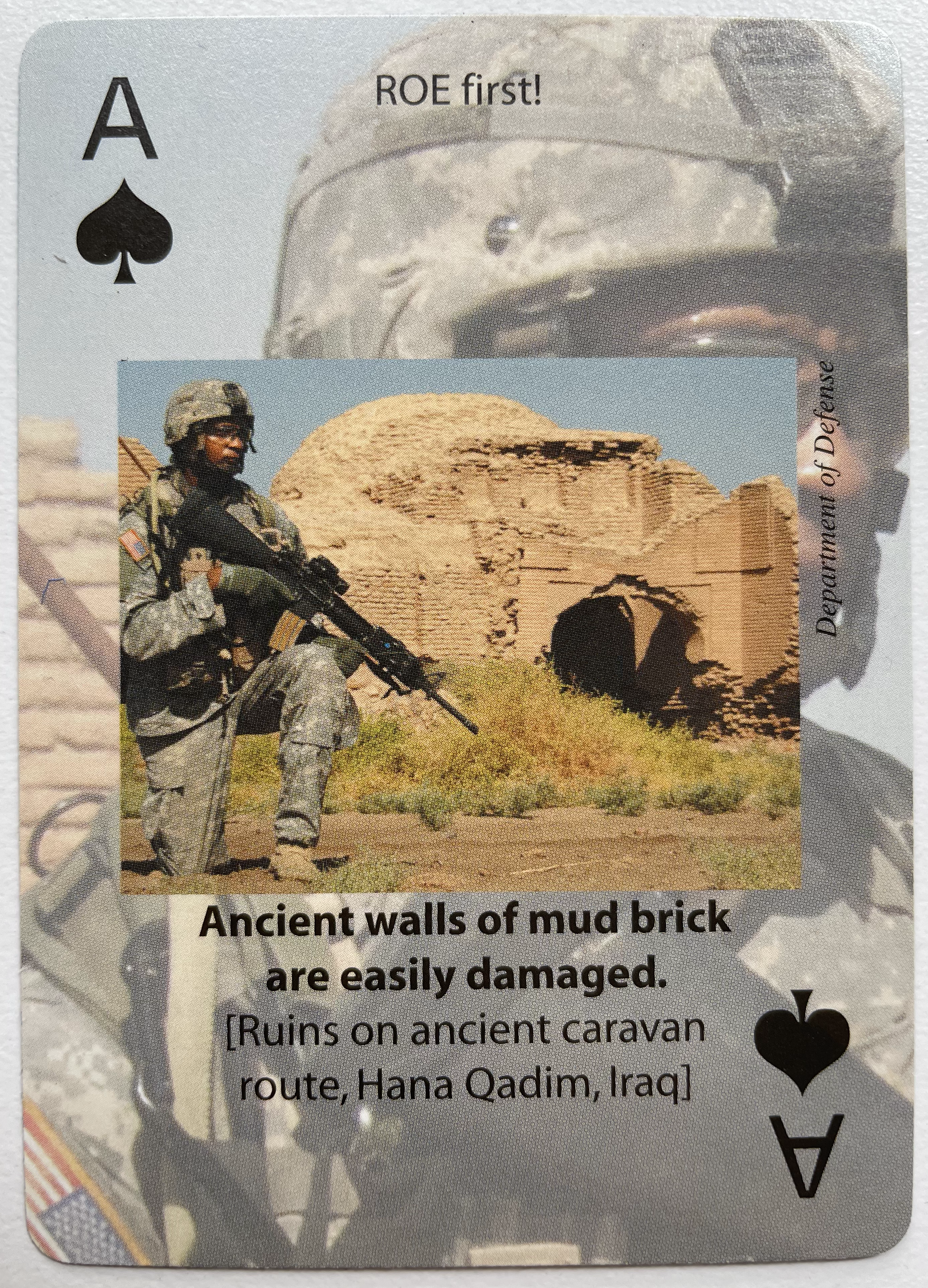
Sample of the cards

The archaeology awareness playing cards are a set of playing cards developed by the United States Department of Defense designed to educate members of the United States military serving in Iraq and Afghanistan about the importance of respecting ancient monuments, to try to preserve the Iraqi and Afghan national cultural heritage. The goal of the publication of the cards was two-fold according to Fort Drum archaeologist Laurie Rush: to prevent unnecessary damage to ancient sites and to stem the illegal trade of artifacts in Iraq. The military has long recognized that educational playing cards are a good way to capitalize on the time soldiers spend waiting for orders.

They were devised following the success of the most-wanted Iraqi playing cards (officially called "personality identification playing cards") that were used in the 2003 invasion of Iraq to help members of the U.S. military identify wanted personnel from the Baathist regime. Approximately 40,000 sets of the cards were issued to U.S. forces. In the archaeology deck, each suit has a theme: diamonds for artifacts, spades for digs, hearts for "winning hearts and minds," and clubs for heritage preservation.

== About the cards ==
=== Spades ===
- A♠ "Ancient walls of mud brick are easily damaged."
- K♠ "Many DoD sites in the US have protected archaeological sites. Learn more about your home installation." Lewisburg Furnace, Fort Drum, New York, United States of America.
- Q♠ "Use a monitor when digging in archaeologically sensitive areas."
- J♠ "Stop digging if you find artifacts or features."
- 10♠ "Heavy excavation equipment can do great harm to archaeological sites. Be aware and prepare to stop."
- 9♠ "Helicopter rotor wash can damage archaeological sites. Avoid where possible."
- 8♠ "Every DoD installation has a cultural resources manager. Call yours with questions about archaeology, history, or culture."
- 7♠ "Taking pictures is good. Removing artifacts for souvenirs is not!"
- 6♠ "Use your camera to document archaeological and historic sites."
- 5♠ "A looted archaeological site means that details of our common past are lost forever."
- 4♠ "If possible, fill sandbags with clean earth, free of man-made objects."
- 3♠ "Leave artifacts like broken pottery or inscribed bricks in place."
- 2♠ "In the dry climate of the Middle East, a wall of mud brick could be thousands of years old." Qalai Bost, Afghanistan.

=== Clubs ===
- A♣ "The DoD needs your help in protecting heritage resources."
- K♣ "Remember this international symbol for a PROTECTED CULTURAL SITE."
- Q♣ "Remember! The buying and selling of antiquities is not condoned by the U.S. Armed Forces."
- J♣ "Ancient cultural artifacts and objects of art are also heritage resources that must be protected."
- 10♣ "A mound or small hill in an otherwise flat landscape could be a sign of ancient human occupation." Tell Rimah, Iraq.
- 9♣ "Future generations will be thankful for the monuments and sites spared today." Bent Minaret, Mosul's Great Mosque, Iraq.
- 8♣ "Stop digging immediately if you find buried walls, broken pottery, or other artifacts. Report what you find!" Ancient walls near Great Ziggurat of Ur, Iraq.
- 7♣ "This site has survived for seventeen centuries. Will it survive you?". Ctesiphon Arch, Iraq.
- 6♣ "Respect ruins wherever possible. They protect you and your cultural history." Samarra Minaret (Malwiya), Iraq.
- 5♣ "Drive around - not over - archaeological sites".
- 4♣ "Look before you dig!"
- 3♣ "No graffiti! Defacing walls or ruins with spray paint or other materials is disrespectful and counterproductive to the mission"
- 2♣ "Ancient Iraqi heritage is part of your heritage. Old stories say that Jonah of the bible [sic] was buried in this hill." (Naba Yunis Mosque in Mosul, Iraq)

=== Hearts ===
- A♥ "The main goal of archaeology is to understand the past - your past."
- K♥ "If it's a defensible position today, it may have been for thousands of years. Watch for archaeological remains."
- Q♥ "Archaeological sites matter to the local community. Showing respect wins hearts and minds."
- J♥ "Local elders may be a good source of information about cultural heritage and archaeology."
- 10♥ "Religious monuments, such as the Bamian Buddhas in Afghanistan, are often targets for intentional destruction during times of conflict." Buddhas of Bamyan, Bamiyan Province, Afghanistan.
- 9♥ "The Bible's Tower of Babel referred to an Iraqi Ziggurat." Great Ziggurat of Ur, Iraq.
- 8♥ "Iraq's civilisation originated in the Fertile Crescent between the Tigris and Euphrates Rivers. Humans first created agricultural settlements here over 8,000 years ago."
- 7♥ "Iraq has been described as the "Cradle of Civilisation." Illustration of the Northwest Palace Throne Room at Nimrud, Iraq.
- 6♥ The world's oldest complete legal code was found in Iraq on a stone carved with an image of Hammurabi, King of Babylon, ca. 1760 B.C."
- 5♥ "Protecting archaeological sites helps preserve them for future generations."
- 4♥ "Protecting art and archaeology is the responsibility of all ranks within a unit."
- 3♥ "To understand the meaning of an artifact, it must be found and studied in its original setting." Hoard of Sumerian statues, Tell Asmar, Iraq.
- 2♥ "Ninety-nine percent of mankind's history can only be understood through archaeology". Ancient ruins at Samarra, Iraq.

=== Diamonds ===
- A♦ "Buying looted artifacts is forbidden. These objects will be confiscated if discovered."
- K♦ "Buddhist statuary from Hadda in Afghanistan has been heavily looted for sale on the illegal market."
- Q♦ "Monumental art, such as the Bamian Buddhas in Afghanistan, should be preserved in place for all humankind." Buddhas of Bamyan, Bamiyan Province, Afghanistan.
- J♦ "How would you feel if someone stole her torch?" Statue of Liberty, New York City, United States of America.
- 10♦ "Mesopotamia is considered the birthplace of writing. Clay tablets such as this one are primary evidence." Ancient cuneiform tablet from Nippur, Iraq.
- 9♦ "The Joint Interagency Task Force recovered more than 5,000 artifacts, including this one stolen from the Iraq Museum." Mask of Warka.
- 8♦ "The Joint Interagency Task Force recovered 62,000 artifacts removed from the Iraq Museum in the years, months, and weeks before the war."
- 7♦ "Museums are also victims of warfare and need protection where possible." Kabul Museum, Afghanistan.
- 6♦ "Thousands of artifacts are disappearing from Iraq and Afghanistan. Report suspicious behaviour."
- 5♦ "Looters leave destructive holes and tunnels throughout archaeological sites. Report all observed war damage and looting."
- 4♦ "Report to your OIC any observed looting activity or attempts to sell or purchase ancient artifacts."
- 3♦ "Purchasing ancient "souvenirs" helps fund insurgents. Do not buy them!"
- 2♦ "Cylinder seals look like carved pieces of chalk. As with other artifacts, do not buy them!" cylinder seals

=== Other ===
The set also contained other cards such as the jokers that provided additional information about heritage preservation.

== Award ==
On November 7, 2007, the DoD program, entitled "In-Theater Heritage Training for Deploying Personnel", was awarded the "Chairman's Award" from the Advisory Council on Historic Preservation, an independent federal agency that promotes the preservation, enhancement, and productive use of the United States of America's historic resources, and advises the President and Congress on national historic preservation policy.

== See also ==
- Archaeology
- Archaeology (magazine)
