= Jamal Mustafa Abdullah =

Iraqi Baath member (born 1955)

- جمال مصطفى عبد الله السلطان

Personal details
- Born: Jamal Mustafa Abdallah Sultan Al-Tikriti; 4 May 1955 (age 71) Baghdad, Iraq
- Party: Iraqi Regional Branch of the Arab Socialist Ba'ath Party

Jamal Mustafa Abdullah Sultan (Arabic: جمال مصطفى عبد الله السلطان; born 4 May 1955) was a deputy in charge of the file for tribes and clans in Saddam Hussein's government and husband of Hala Hussein, Saddam's youngest daughter. His brother, Kamal Mustafa Abdullah, was the Secretary General of the Republican Guard.

== After 2003 ==
His name was included in the list of Iraqis wanted by the United States at number 40. He was arrested on 20 April 2003.

Jamal was released on 30 June 2020 from al-Hout prison in Dhi Qar.
