= Iraqi Ports Institute =

Iraqi Ports Institute معهد الموانىء العراقي
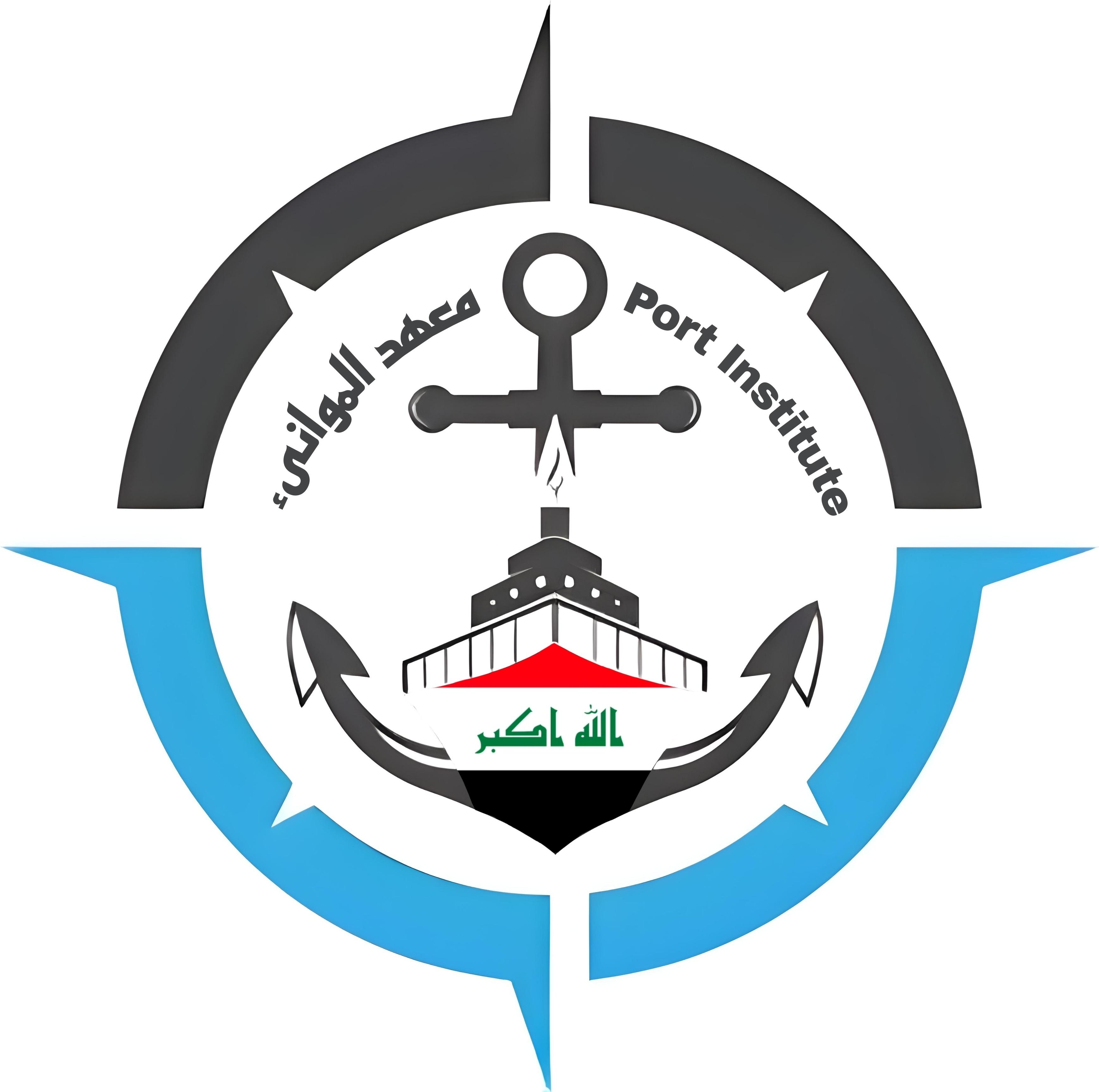
- Seal
- Nickname: IPI
- Country: Iraq
- Established: 2019; 7 years ago
- The director of the ports institute: Farazdaq Abdulrazzaq Hashim
- The Vice director of the ports institute: Tariq Abdul-Zahra
- The members of the scientific committee are: Dr. Ammar ali Abed Al-Safi Dr. Najm al-Dīn Abdullah Najm Dr. Hesham Farouk Tawfik
- Affiliations: General Company for Ports of Iraq

Iraqi Ports Institute (IPI), informally known as Ports Institute, is an Institute in the city of Basra Iraq.

== Introduction to Ports Institute ==
The Ports Institute was established in accordance with the letter of the Ministry of Education and Scientific Research - Department of Studies, Planning and Follow-up dated 10/10/2019. The Ports Institute receives graduates of the preparatory study in scientific, literary, industrial and commercial departments, with an average of not less than 60% for both sections, and the Institute grants a diploma in Ports Technology and Management.

== Ports Institute departments ==
The Ports Institute includes the following departments

- Port Technologies Department
- Ports Management Department

== Ports Institute divisions ==
The Ports Institute includes four divisions: the Marine Sciences Division, the Research and Development Division, the Administrative and Financial Division, and the Student Affairs Division. In addition to two units: the Quality and Institutional Development Unit and the Electronic Correspondence Unit.

== Ports Institute laboratories ==
The Ports Institute includes several laboratories, namely the Machine Parts Laboratory, the Refrigeration and Air Conditioning Laboratory, the Fluid Mechanics Laboratory, the Hydraulics Laboratory, the Electrical Laboratory, the Materials Resistance Laboratory, the Computers Laboratory, the Languages Laboratory, and the Marine Sciences Laboratory. The institute also includes four workshops: the mechanics workshop, the carpentry workshop, the lathe workshop, and the welding workshop.

== Institute private library ==
The institute includes a private library with an area of 300 square meters, which operates using the electronic system and contains more than 2,500 books on various engineering sciences, arts, literature, geography, history, and law. The institute also contains a private cafeteria for students and trainees in the institute's courses, in addition to a gymnasium hall.

== Marine simulators project ==
Currently, the marine simulators project is being worked on and prepared, which is funded by the Japan International Cooperation Agency (JICA). It includes a ship navigation simulator, an engine breaker simulator, a drilling simulator, and a distress device simulator.
