= Khamis Sirhan =

Iraqi politician

- خميس سرحان بشير المحمدي

Personal details
- Born: Khamis Sirhan Bashar; Al-Muhammadi; 1954
- Died: 11 January 2013 (aged 58–59)
- Party: Iraqi Regional Branch of the Arab Socialist Ba'ath Party

Khamis Sirhan Bashar Al-Muhammadi (Arabic: خميس سرحان بشير المحمدي; 1954 – 11 January 2013) was an Iraqi politician and leader of the Arab Socialist Ba'ath Party. He was responsible for the organizations of Karbala province.

Prior to that, he held the position of secretary of the leadership of the Fallujah branch of the Arab Socialist Ba'ath Party, and was a member of the Iraqi National Council.

== After the 2003 invasion ==
His name was included in the list of Iraqis wanted by the United States, and appeared in a deck of playing cards for the most-wanted Iraqis. US forces believed that he was behind the Al-Rasheed Hotel attacks and the downing of a US Chinook near the city of Fallujah.

On 11 January 2004, Khamis Sirhan was captured by US special operations forces near Ramadi, about 110 kilometres (68 mi) west of Baghdad and a focal point of the anti-American insurgency. He was No. 54 on the US military's 55-most wanted Iraqis list.

He was released on 4 August 2010, after being acquitted of the charges brought against him in the case of draining the marshes.

== Death ==
He died on 11 January 2013.
