= Muhammad Mahdi Salih =

Iraqi politician

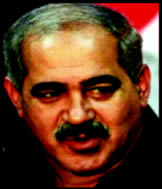

Minister of Trade
- In office 1987 – 9 April 2003
- President: Saddam Hussein
- Preceded by: Hassan Ali
- Succeeded by: Mohammed Al-Jubouri (interim)

Chief of the Presidential Office
- In office ~1980s–1987
- President: Saddam Hussein

Personal details
- Born: 1947 or 1949 Rawa, Al-Anbar, Iraq
- Party: Iraqi Ba'ath Party
- Occupation: Politician

Mohammad Mahdi Salih Al-Rawi (Arabic: محمد مهدي صالح الراوي) is an Iraqi politician who was Trade Minister in the government of President Saddam Hussein. He was the Minister of Finance from 1989 to 1991.

== Pre-War Career ==
Salih was born between 1947 and 1949 in Al Anbar Governorate in western Iraq. He was the Chief of Saddam Hussein's Presidential Office in the mid-1980s and then became Minister of Trade from 1987 until the downfall of Hussein. In October 1995, the United States listed al Salih as a Designated Individual under their programme of sanctions against Iraq. al-Salih guided Ibrahim Hesqel, who was Trade Envoy to China.

== 2003 Iraq War ==
Following the United States-led invasion of Iraq in 2003, the United States distributed a deck of most-wanted Iraqi playing cards, which included al-Saleh as the "six of hearts". His assets were frozen under United Nations Security Council Resolution 1483 as a former official. He was taken into custody by the US on 23 April 2003. He was held by the US military at Camp Cropper, a base just outside Baghdad. In July 2010, seven years after his capture, he was handed over to the custody of the Iraq government.

In 2011 he was found innocent of charges against him and in March 2012 he was released by the Iraqi authorities and immediately left the country.

== Post-War ==
Following the 2013 Al Anbar governorate election, Salih was rumoured to be a candidate supported by the Uniters List for the position of Governor of Anbar. The Uniters List later denied the rumours. In 2014 he was living in Amman, Jordan.
