= Hossam Mohammed Amin =

Iraqi general (1950–2021)

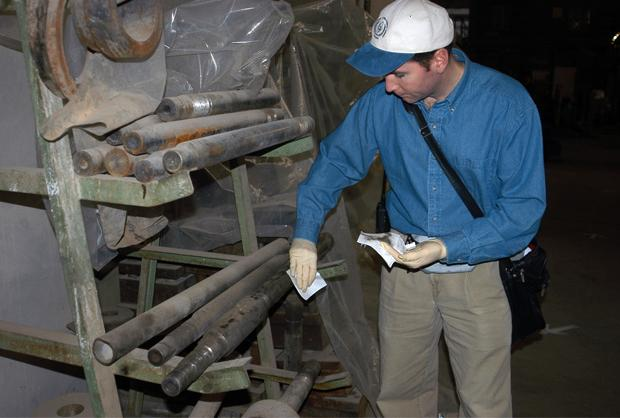
A UN weapons inspector in Iraq.

Hossam Mohammed Amin (Arabic: حسام محمد أمين; 12 March 1950 – 8 July 2021) was an Iraqi general under Saddam Hussein's government. He is stated to have said in 2002 that Iraq would submit a list of chemical, biological and nuclear programs to UNMOVIC, but that the report would not disclose any banned weapons, "because, really, we have no weapons of mass destruction."

== Biography ==
Originally from Saddam's home town of Tikrit, Amin studied Mechanical Engineering at the University of Mosul, then Master's degree at the University of Belgrade in Yugoslavia.

He participated as an Iraqi member delegation in the discussions conducted between Iraq and the United Nations and the IAEA for the period 1991–2003. He was number 49 on the US list of 55 most wanted Iraqis during the 2003 invasion of Iraq. He was the 13th on the list taken into custody on or around 26 April 2003. Before his capture, American intelligence agents had previously urged Amin to defect and provide the United States with key information on the Iraqi weapons program, as well as Saddam Hussein's inner circle. He was released from U.S. custody on 23 December 2005.

Amin worked as officer engineer in the army and military industrialization corporation in Iraq and was considered to be one of the scientists who developed missile systems.

He died from COVID-19 complications in the United Arab Emirates on 8 July 2021.
