= Barzan Abd al-Ghafur Sulaiman Majid Al-Tikriti =

Iraqi Republican Guard commander

- برزان عبد الغفور سليمان مجيد التكريتي
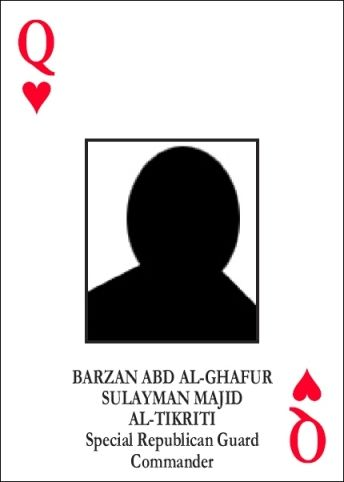
- Al-Tikriti's most-wanted Iraqi playing card

Personal details
- Born: Barzan Abd al-Ghafur Sulaiman Majid Al-Tikriti; July 1, 1960 (age 66)
- Party: Iraqi Regional Branch of the Arab Socialist Ba'ath Party

Barzan Abd al-Ghafur Sulaiman Majid Al-Tikriti (Arabic: برزان عبد الغفور سليمان مجيد التكريتي), also known as Barzan Razuki Abd Al-Ghafur (born 1 July 1960 in Saladin Governorate) is an Iraqi ex-Republican Guard Commander under Saddam Hussein and member of the Arab Socialist Ba'ath Party. He was the "Queen of Hearts" in the U.S. deck of most-wanted Iraqi playing cards during the Second Iraq War.

He was captured on 23 July 2003, and released from prison on 29 June 2020.
