= Hussein Al-Awadi =

Iraqi politician (born 1944)

- حسين العوادي

Personal details
- Born: 1944 (age 81–82)
- Party: Iraqi Regional Branch of the Arab Socialist Ba'ath Party

Hussein Al-Awadi (Arabic: حسين العوادي; born 1944) is a former Iraqi politician and member of the Arab Socialist Ba'ath Party, Governor of Anbar (1995), Governor of Najaf (1996), and official of the party's organizations in Nineveh Governorate.

== After the 2003 invasion ==
His name was included in the list of 55 Iraqis most wanted by the United States, and he was captured by U.S. forces on June 9, 2003.

Al-Awadi was indicted in the case of the suppression of the uprising in 1991.
