= Rashid Taan Kazim =

Iraqi politician

- رشيد طعان كاظم
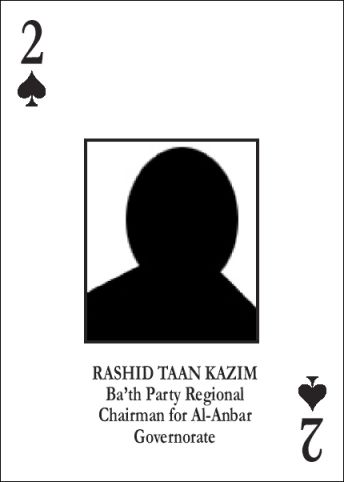
- Most-wanted Iraqi playing card of Rashid Taan

Personal details
- Born: Rashid Taan Kazem al-Azzawi
- Party: Iraqi Regional Branch of the Arab Socialist Ba'ath Party

Rashid Taan Kazem al-Azzawi (Arabic: رشيد طعان كاظم العزاوي) is a prominent leader in the Ba'ath Party, where he held the position of official of the party's organizations in Anbar Governorate as well as Governor of Anbar during former President Saddam Hussein's rule. He was elected as a member of the party's regional leadership in 2001.

Rashid Taan was born in a village near Muqdadiya in Diyala Governorate.

== After the 2003 U.S. invasion ==
He was on the list of the most wanted faces of the Iraqi regime during the occupation of Iraq. He was 49th of the 55 wanted.

He is suspected of being linked to insurgency operations against the Iraqi government and the Americans, and the American government has allocated a reward of one million dollars to anyone who helps arrest him.

He is accused of carrying out criminal operations in Diyala province.

The Iraqi government announced his arrest in 2006, though the BBC says he is still on the run as of 2010.
