= Conseiller chargé des investissements =

Conseiller chargé des investissements (French for "advisor in charge of investments") is the title of a class of diplomatic envoy below trade commissioner.

Such a post is created by an embassy to undertake a special diplomatic project abroad on behalf of a head of mission or the government. Most often, the project is to research suitable investment opportunities or procure investment abroad.

The envoy is accredited to an embassy in one country, yet may spend a considerable amount of time abroad or even be permanently resident in another jurisdiction.

== Sources ==
- UN Conference on Trade and Development
