= Sabawi Ibrahim al-Tikriti =

Head of the Iraqi secret police

Sabawi Ibrahim سبعاوي إبراهيم

Head of the Directorate of General Security
- In office 1991–1996
- Preceded by: Abdul Rahman al-Douri
- Succeeded by: Taha Abbas al-Ahbabi

Director of the Intelligence Service
- In office 1989–1995
- Preceded by: Fadhil al-Barak
- Succeeded by: Ali Hassan al-Majid

Personal details
- Born: 27 February 1947 Tikrit, Kingdom of Iraq
- Died: 8 July 2013 (aged 66) Baghdad, Iraq
- Party: Arab Socialist Ba'ath Party
- Relations: Barzan (brother); Watban (brother); Daham (half-brother); Saddam (half-brother); Khairallah (uncle and father-in-law); Abd al-Latif (uncle); Badra (aunt); Rafi (cousin); Hani (cousin)
- Children: Ayman; Bashar; Ibrahim; Omar; Sa'd; Yasir
- Parent(s): Ibrahim al-Hassan; Subha Talfah
- Occupation: Intelligence officer

Sabawi Ibrahim al-Tikriti (Arabic: سبعاوي إبراهيم التكريتي; 27 February 1947 – 8 July 2013), half-brother of Saddam Hussein, was the leader of the Iraqi secret service, the Mukhabarat, at the time of the 1991 Gulf War. He was the head of the Directorate of General Security from 1991 to 1996, and later served as a presidential advisor to Hussein.

After the 2003 invasion of Iraq by a United States-led coalition, Sabawi went into hiding. On 27 February 2005, his arrest was made public. Sabawi was the "six of Diamonds" in the US deck of most-wanted Iraqi playing cards, and number 36 of the top 55 most-wanted Iraqis list. He was suspected of being behind explosions and killings that took place after the collapse of the former Iraqi regime, and a one-million dollar reward was offered for information leading to his capture or death. Syria had captured Sabawi and turned him over to Iraqi forces, who in turn handed him over to U.S. forces. Syria was repeatedly accused of protecting former Iraqi officials, a charge the Syrian government consistently denied.

In March 2009, Sabawi was sentenced to death by hanging by a court in Baghdad. As his death sentence was read out, he stood up and proclaimed "God is great" and that he was proud to be a martyr. On 8 July 2013, Sabawi died of cancer.

His son, Ayman, also arrested by the U.S., was serving a life sentence when he escaped from prison on 9 December 2006. One of Ibrahim's brothers, Watban Ibrahim al-Tikriti, was also sentenced to death, while his other brother, Barzan Ibrahim al-Tikriti, was executed in 2007.
