= Ghazi Hamoud Al-Obaidi =

Iraqi politician

- غازي حمود العبيدي

Personal details
- Born: Ghazi Hamoud Al-Obaidi; 1944
- Died: 1 April 2007 (aged 63)
- Party: Iraqi Regional Branch of the Arab Socialist Ba'ath Party

Ghazi Hamoud Al-Obaidi (Arabic: غازي حمود العبيدي; 1944 - April 2007) was an Iraqi politician and a member of the regional leadership of the Arab Socialist Ba'ath Party, and was responsible for the organizations of Wasit Governorate. He was born in 1944 in Baghdad.

He was appointed Governor of Basra in 1980, and Maysan Governor in 1983.

== After the 2003 invasion of Iraq ==
He was arrested during the 2003 invasion of Iraq. However, in April 2005 he was released due to cancer.

== Death ==
He died in April 2007 due to cancer.
