= Nayef Shindakh Thamer =

Iraqi politician

Nayef Shindakh Thamer Al-Ghalbi
- نايف شنداخ ثامر

Personal details
- Born: Nayef Shindakh Thamer Al-Ghalbi
- Died: c. 22 March 2003
- Party: Iraqi Regional Branch of the Arab Socialist Ba'ath Party

Nayef Shindakh Thamer Al-Ghalbi (Arabic: نايف شنداخ ثامر; died c. 22 March 2003) was an Iraqi politician and a member of the Arab Socialist Ba'ath Party. He served as the official of the party's organizations in Salah al-Din Governorate. He also was a member of the Iraqi National Council as well as a party official in Najaf Governorate.

== After the 2003 invasion ==
His name was included in the list of Iraqis wanted by the United States, but he is believed to have been killed during the invasion of Iraq, as the Iraq satellite channel broadcast a statement noting his death on 22 March 2003.
