= Latif Nassif Jassim =

Iraqi politician (1941–2021)

- لطيف نصيف جاسم

Minister of Agriculture
- In office 5 April 1977 – 16 July 1979

Minister of Culture and Information
- In office 16 July 1979 – 23 March 1991

Minister of Labor and Social Affairs
- In office 5 September 1993 – 2 January 1997

Personal details
- Born: Latif Nassif Jassim Al-Dulaimi; 1941 Baghdad, Iraq
- Died: 30 August 2021 (aged 79–80) Baghdad, Iraq
- Party: Iraqi Regional Branch of the Arab Socialist Ba'ath Party

Latif Nassif Jassim (Arabic: لطيف نصيف جاسم; 1941 – 30 August 2021) was an Iraqi politician and leader of the Arab Socialist Ba'ath Party.

== Biography ==
Latif Nassif Jassim was born in 1941 and belonged to the Dulaim tribe. He joined the Ba'ath party in 1957 and was arrested after the 18 November 1963 movement.

He held ministerial positions from 1977 until 1996. He was appointed minister of agriculture and agrarian reform on 5 April 1977, minister of culture and media until 1991 and minister of labor and social affairs until 1996.

His name was included in the list of Iraqis wanted by the United States at number 18, and he was the "10 of Clubs" in the U.S. deck of most-wanted Iraqi playing cards.

Jassim was arrested on 9 June 2003, and sentenced to life imprisonment in 2009 in Al-Hout prison in the case of the murder of Mohammad al-Sadr.

In 2017, Iraqi parliament passed a law to confiscate all property of 52 people related to Ba'ath party regime including Jassim.

He died on 30 August 2021 at hospital in Baghdad.
