= Nasiriyah Central Prison =

Prison

- Interactive map of Nasiriyah Central Prison
- Location: Nasiriyah, Iraq; 30°59′48.2″N 46°10′10.5″E
- Security class: Maximum security prison
- Capacity: 800
- Population: 6000 (2017)
- Opened: 2008
- Managed by: Ministry of Justice (Iraq)

Nasiriyah Central Prison (Arabic: سجن الناصرية المركزي), also known as al-Hoot prison (سجن الحوت), is a maximum security prison near Nasiriyah in the Dhi Qar Governorate of Iraq. It is the largest prison in southern Iraq.

== History ==
The prison was built at a cost of roughly $49,000,000 by the United States Army Corps of Engineers. It opened in July 2008.

=== Prison conditions ===
According to Alkarama, a Swiss human rights organisation, "conditions of detention in Al Nasiriyah prison remain very poor and prisoners are systematically tortured on a daily basis". Iraqi officials have stated that around 1,200 of the estimated 6,000 prisoners held in Nasiriyah have been sentenced to death. The prison is vastly overcrowded since it was only designed to hold 800 prisoners. The prisoners are mostly Sunni Muslims detained for political crimes or alleged involvement in terrorism.

In February 2018, a report by the Baghdad Centre for Human Rights ranked Nasiriyah prison as the worst in Iraq for mistreatment of prisoners.

=== Notable prisoners ===
- Ayesh al-Harby, hijacker of Saudi Arabian Airlines Flight 115 on 14 October 2000.
- Fahad al-Anzi, Mohammed al-Obeid, Majid al-Buqami, Faisal al-Faraj, Battal al-Harbi, Ali al-Shahri, Ali al-Qahtani, Hamad Yahya and Abdulrahman al-Qahtani, a group of Saudi Arabian prisoners.
- Sultan Hashim Ahmad al-Tai, served as Minister of Defense under Saddam Hussein's regime, died in custody on July 19, 2020 from heart attack.

=== Executions ===
- On 21 August 2016, 36 members of the Islamic State of Iraq and the Levant were hanged for their involvement in the Camp Speicher massacre.
- On 1 September 2016, seven prisoners from Libya, Tunisia, Sudan, Palestine, Syria, Jordan and Egypt were hanged, accused of being members of the Islamic State of Iraq and the Levant.
- On 24 September 2017, 42 prisoners were hanged, allegedly members of the Islamic State of Iraq and the Levant. UN High Commissioner for Human Rights Prince Zeid bin Ra'ad said it was unlikely due process had been met. According to the UN, "no information has been released about their names, places of residence, exact crimes, trials, date of sentencing, or the appeals processes".
- On 14 December 2017, 38 prisoners alleged to be members of the Islamic State of Iraq and the Levant were hanged.
