= Sultan Hashim Ahmad al-Tai =

27th Iraqi Minister of Defense

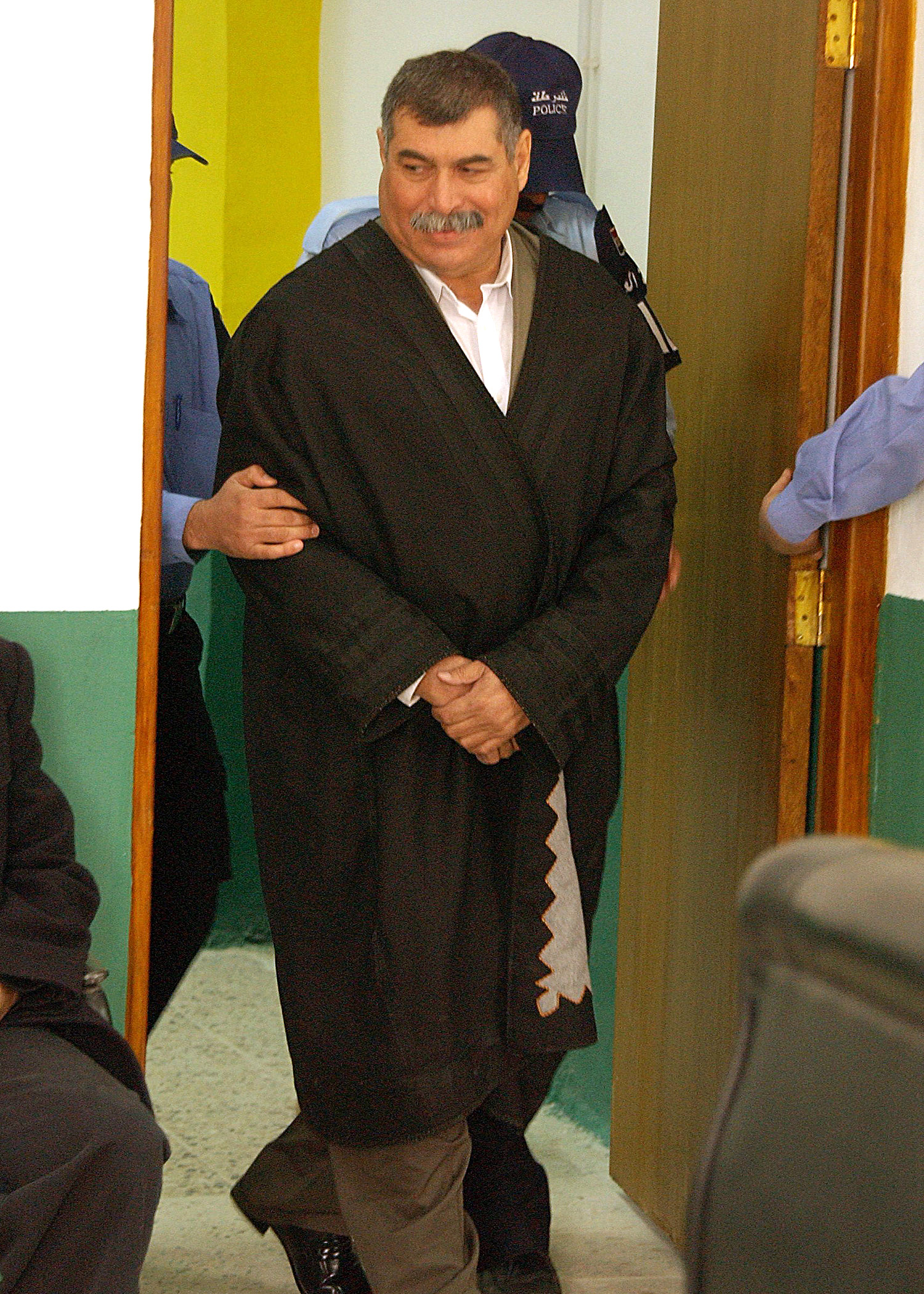
- Ahmad in December 2004

Iraqi Minister of Defence
- In office 1995–2003
- President: Saddam Hussein
- Prime Minister: Saddam Hussein
- Preceded by: Ali Hassan al-Majid
- Succeeded by: Hazim al-Shaalan

Governor of Nineveh
- In office 1994–1999
- Preceded by: Muhammad Abdul Qadir al-Daghestani
- Succeeded by: Abdul-Wahid Shannan ar-Ribat

Personal details
- Born: 1944 Mosul, Kingdom of Iraq
- Died: 19 July 2020 (aged 75–76) Nasiriyah Central Prison, Nasiriyah, Iraq
- Party: Arab Socialist Ba'ath Party
- Children: 8 sons and 2 daughters, including Khaled.

Military service
- Allegiance: Iraq
- Branch/service: Iraqi Ground Forces
- Years of service: 1960–2003
- Battles/wars: First Iraqi-Kurdish War; Six-Day War; Yom Kippur War; Iran–Iraq War; Persian Gulf War; Iraq War
- Criminal information
- Convictions: War crimes Crimes against humanity
- Penalty: Death; commuted to life imprisonment

Sulṭān Hāshim Aḥmad Muḥammad al-Ṭāʾī (Arabic: سلطان هاشم أحمد محمد الطائي; 1944 – 19 July 2020) was an Iraqi military officer, who served as Minister of Defense under Saddam Hussein's regime. Considered one of Iraq's most competent generals, he was appointed to the position in 1995. During his over 30-year military career, Sultan commanded two brigades, three divisions, and two corps of regular army corps before assuming responsibilities as Minister of Defense.

== Career ==
=== Persian Gulf War ===
Sultan served in the Iraqi Army during the Iran–Iraq War and later in the Persian Gulf War, signing the ceasefire that ended it. He survived several purges and became the highest-ranking general in the Iraqi Army. He was regarded largely as a figurehead in the Iraqi military without any amount of real control.

=== Iraq War ===
As the invasion of Iraq loomed, it was reported in The Guardian in February 2003 that Sultan had been placed under house arrest by Saddam Hussein, in a move that was apparently designed to prevent a coup. He criticized Qusay Hussein’s handling of the Iraqi Republican Guard, saying Qusay “knew nothing [about commanding military]. He understood only simple military things like a civilian. We prepared information and advice for him and he'd accept it or not.” Nevertheless, he continued to appear on Iraqi state-run T.V., to preserve a sense of normality.

Sultan was number 27 on the United States' list of most wanted former Iraqi officials. On 19 September 2003, after nearly a week of negotiations, he gave himself up in Mosul to the 101st Airborne Division (Air Assault). Dawood Bagistani, who arranged the surrender to Maj. Gen. David Petraeus, said Sultan was handed over "with great respect" and was with his family at the time. Bagistani said the U.S. military had promised to remove Sultan's name from the list of 55 most wanted, meaning he would not face indefinite confinement and possible prosecution. "We trust the promise," Bagistani said.

Special treatment for Sultan al-Tai could be an effort to defuse the guerrilla-style attacks that were taking a toll on American soldiers. Many of the attackers were thought to be former soldiers in Saddam's army. Seeing their former military leader well-treated by the Americans might have encouraged them to lay down their arms.

On 24 June 2007, he was sentenced to death by hanging for war crimes and crimes against humanity. However, his execution was not carried out because of public disapproval from Iraq's president Jalal Talabani. In May 2018, Iraq's Parliament speaker Salim al-Jabouri requested a pardon for Sultan al-Tai, citing medical reasons. He then was transferred from the prison in Nasiriyah to a prison in Baghdad.

=== Death ===
Sultan al-Tai died on 19 July 2020 from a heart attack in the Nasiriyah Central Prison.
