= Watban Ibrahim =

Iraqi politician (1952–2015)

- وطبان ابراهيم
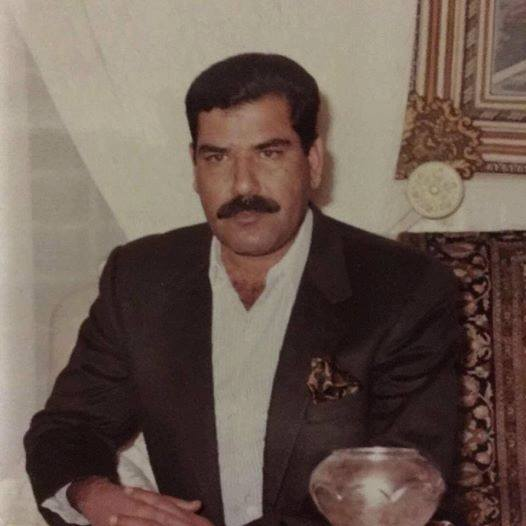

Interior Minister of Iraq
- In office 1991–1995
- President: Saddam Hussein
- Prime Minister: Saddam Hussein; Ahmad Husayn Khudayir as-Samarrai; Muhammad Hamzah az-Zubaydi; Sa'dun Hammadi

Personal details
- Born: 1952 Tikrit, Kingdom of Iraq
- Died: 13 August 2015 (aged 62–63) Baghdad, Iraq
- Party: Ba'ath Party
- Relations: Sabawi (brother); Barzan (brother); Daham (half-brother); Saddam (half-brother); Khairallah (uncle and father-in-law); Abd al-Latif (uncle); Badra (aunt); Rafi (cousin); Hani (cousin)
- Children: Ahmed and Adnan

Watban Ibrahim al-Nasiri (Arabic: وطبان إبراهيم الناصري; 1952 – 13 August 2015) was an Iraqi politician and former interior minister of Iraq. He was the half-brother of Saddam Hussein and the brother of Barzan al-Tikriti. He was taken into coalition custody on April 13, 2003, following his capture as he tried fleeing to Syria. He died in prison of natural causes in 2015.

As Saddam's half-brother, Watban was a close advisor of his, belonging to Saddam's inner circle while also holding several high-profile security apparatus roles. In those roles, he allegedly took part in the genocidal Al-Anfal Campaign against the Kurds in Northern Iraq. He became Interior Minister in 1991, and in that role was accused of having overseen the detention, torture, and executions of hundreds of prisoners. Some of those executions were reportedly taped, with copies kept at the ministry. As Interior Minister, Watban was also involved in suppressing the 1991 uprisings in Iraq, specifically in the Baghdad suburbs of Thawra, Shu'la, Hurriya' Bayya', the village of Yousiffiya and the nearby districts of Mahmoudiyah. Government suppression of the uprising in these districts often involved mass executions.

Watban was a member of the Arab Socialist Ba'ath Party. Despite his high-profile roles, he was believed to not have been fully trusted by Saddam. In 1995, he was shot nine times in the leg by Uday Hussein, Saddam's oldest son, reportedly during an argument over Watban's growing popularity among Iraqis. He reportedly lost his leg, genitals, and part of his stomach as a result. After the incident, Saddam ordered Watban to a position of relative obscurity in Tikrit.

After the 2003 invasion of Iraq by a United States-led coalition, Watban was the five of spades in the U.S. military's most-wanted Iraqi playing cards. He was taken into coalition custody on April 13, 2003, following his capture as he tried fleeing to Syria.

On 11 March 2009, Watban was sentenced to death by hanging for his role in the execution of 42 merchants accused of manipulating food prices.

On the morning of 14 July 2011, the U.S. handed Watban over to Iraqi authorities, expecting that he would be executed within a month. Instead, he remained imprisoned until his death from natural causes on 13 August 2015.

In 2017, Uday's son Massoud claimed, without sharing any evidence, that his body had been stolen by the Iranian government. The claim was never proven.
