= Saddam (disambiguation) =

Saddam Hussein (1937–2006) was an Iraqi politician, the 5th President of Iraq.

Saddam may also refer to:

- Saddam (name), an Arabic given name
- Saddam Beach, a village in India
- Saddam: The Secret Life, a biographical book about Saddam Hussein
- Sadr City, a district of Baghdad, named "Saddam City" from 1983–2003
- Baghdad International Airport, named "Saddam International Airport" from 1979–2003
- Al-Nahrain University in Baghdad, named "Saddam University" from 1986–2003
- Mosul Dam, formerly named Saddam Dam

== See also ==
- Shaddam
