= Sadam =

Sadam may refer to:

- JK Tallinna Sadam, defunct Estonian football team
- Sodam, village in Andhra Pradesh, India
- Variant spelling of Saddam
  - Sadam Koumi, sprinter
  - Sadam Ali, boxer
