= Field marshal (Iraq) =

Highest military rank of the Iraqi Army

Field Marshal مهيب الركن
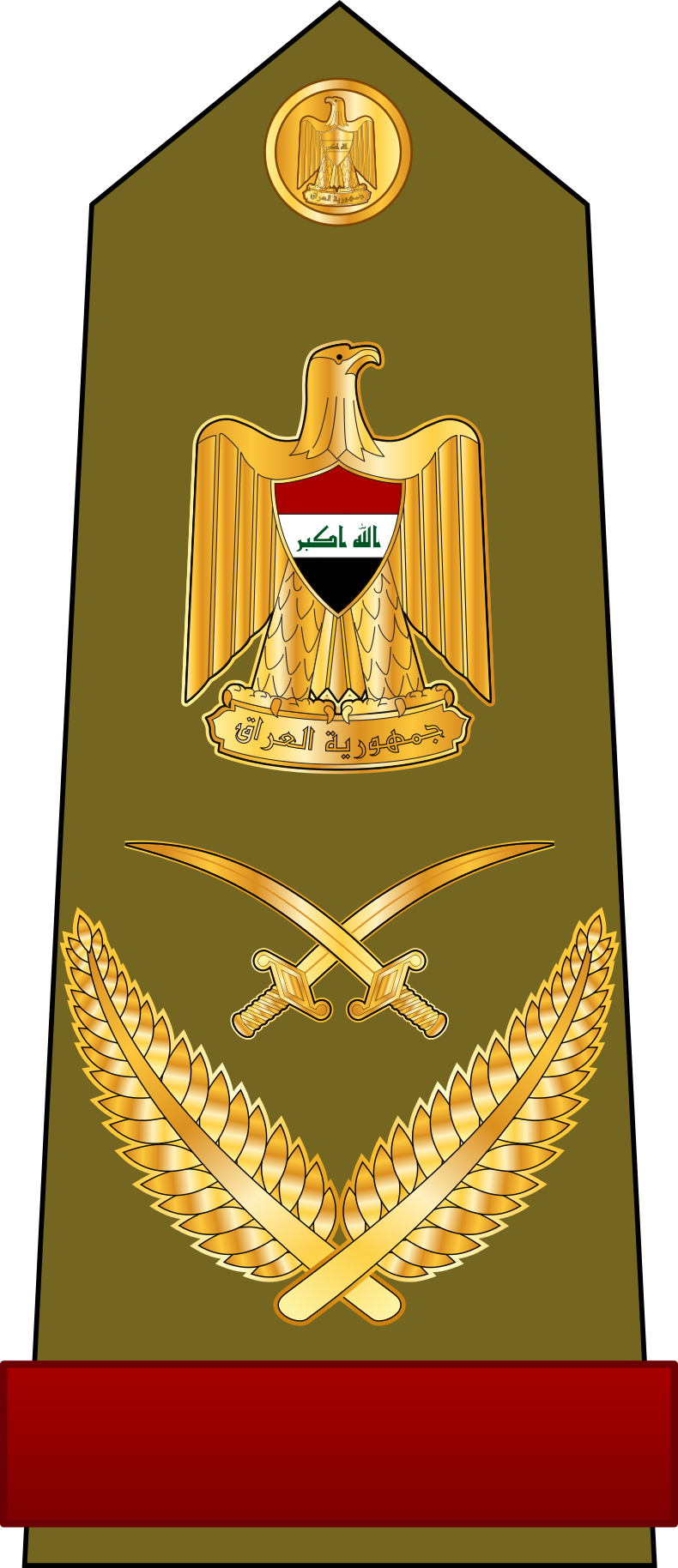
- Marshal of the Republic of Iraq insignia

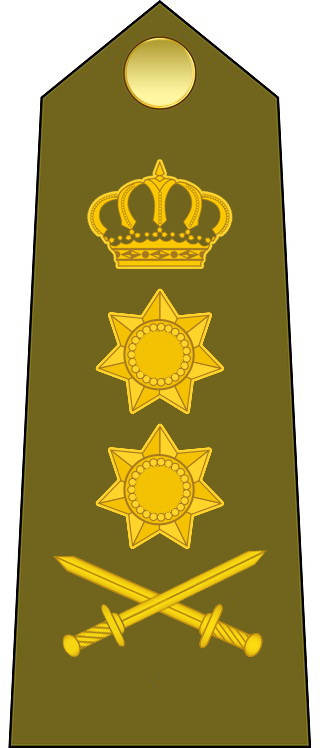
- Marshal of the Kingdom of Iraq insignia
- Country: Iraq
- Service branch: Iraqi Ground Forces
- Abbreviation: FM
- Rank: Five star
- Formation: 23 August 1921
- Abolished: 1 May 2003
- Next higher rank: None
- Next lower rank: Colonel general
- Equivalent ranks: Marshal of the Air Force; Admiral of the Fleet

Field marshal (Arabic: مهيب, romanized: Muhib) was a five–star officer rank and the highest attainable rank in the Iraqi Armed Forces. Field marshal ranks immediately above colonel general, but is now generally considered to be obsolete. The rank was typically conferred ex officio upon the head of state of Iraq (typically either upon the King of Iraq or upon the President of Iraq). The last known person to be conferred this rank was former Iraqi president Saddam Hussein.

== Nomenclature ==
The rank used to be called 'Mushir' (Arabic: مشير) which was in line with the militaries of other Arab countries however it was changed to 'Muhib' following the 17 July Revolution.

Typically, the term 'al-rukn' (Arabic: الركن) would follow 'Muhib', this literally translates to 'staff' as an officer would've underwent further military education and would be awarded a red stripe at the base of their shoulderboards upon graduation from a staff college. However, due to most of the recipients obtaining this rank ex officio, this practice is technically redundant.

== List of marshals ==
Rank	Date of Promotion	Portrait	Name	Date of death	Notes
Field Marshal of the Royal Iraqi Army	23 August 1921		Faisal I	8 September 1933	Ex officio; King of Iraq from 23 August 1921 to 8 September 1933
Marshal of the Royal Iraqi Air Force	8 September 1933		Ghazi of Iraq	4 April 1939	Ex officio; King of Iraq from 8 September 1933 to 4 April 1939
Field Marshal of the Royal Iraqi Army	4 April 1939		Abd al-Ilah	14 July 1958	Ex officio; Crown Prince of Iraq from 4 April 1939 to 14 July 1958
Field Marshal of the Royal Iraqi Army	2 May 1953		Faisal II	14 July 1958	Ex officio; King of Iraq from 4 April 1939 to 14 July 1958
Staff Marshal of the Iraqi Army	8 February 1963		Abdul Salam Arif	13 April 1966	President of Iraq from 8 February 1963 to 13 April 1966; Served in the First Arab–Israeli War
Staff Marshal of the Iraqi Army	Late 1968		Ahmed Hassan al-Bakr	4 October 1982	President of Iraq from 17 July 1968 to 16 July 1979; Served in the Anglo–Iraqi War
Marshal of the Iraqi Army	16 July 1979		Saddam Hussein	30 December 2006	Ex officio; President of Iraq from 16 July 1979 to 9 April 2003
