= Saddam Hussein =

President of Iraq from 1979 to 2003

Field Marshal Saddam Hussein
- صَدَّام حُسَيْن
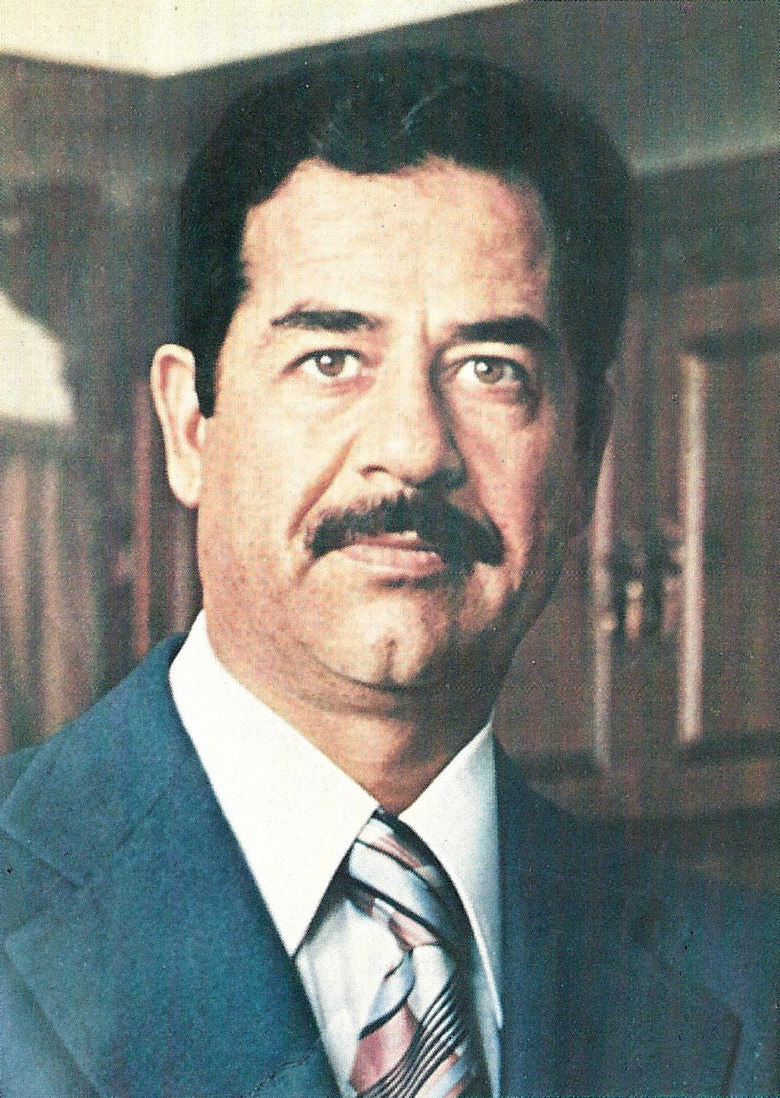
- Official portrait, 1979

5th President of Iraq
- In office 16 July 1979 – 9 April 2003
- Prime Minister: Himself (1979–1991, 1994–2003); Sa'dun Hammadi (1991); Mohammed Hamza Zubeidi (1991–1993); Ahmad Husayn as-Samarrai (1993–1994)
- Vice President: Taha Muhie-eldin Marouf (1974–2003); Izzat Ibrahim al-Douri (1979–2003); Taha Yassin Ramadan (1991–2003)
- Preceded by: Ahmed Hassan al-Bakr
- Succeeded by: Jay Garner (as Director of the Office for Reconstruction and Humanitarian Assistance of Iraq); Jalal Talabani (2005)

Chairman of the Revolutionary Command Council
- In office 16 July 1979 – 9 April 2003
- Preceded by: Ahmed Hassan al-Bakr
- Succeeded by: Office abolished

Prime Minister of Iraq
- In office 29 May 1994 – 9 April 2003
- President: Himself
- Preceded by: Ahmad Husayn Khudayir as-Samarrai
- Succeeded by: Mohammad Bahr al-Ulloum (as Acting President of the Governing Council of Iraq)
- In office 16 July 1979 – 23 March 1991
- President: Himself
- Deputy: Tariq Aziz
- Preceded by: Ahmed Hassan al-Bakr
- Succeeded by: Sa'dun Hammadi

Secretary General of the National Command of the Arab Socialist Ba'ath Party
- In office January 1992 – 30 December 2006
- Preceded by: Michel Aflaq
- Succeeded by: Izzat Ibrahim al-Douri

Regional Secretary of the Regional Command of the Iraqi Regional Branch
- In office 16 July 1979 – 30 December 2006
- National Secretary: Michel Aflaq (until 1989); Himself (from 1989)
- Preceded by: Ahmed Hassan al-Bakr
- Succeeded by: Izzat Ibrahim ad-Douri
- In office February 1964 – October 1966
- Preceded by: Ahmed Hassan al-Bakr
- Succeeded by: Ahmed Hassan al-Bakr

Vice President of Iraq
- In office 17 July 1968 – 15 July 1979
- President: Ahmed Hassan al-Bakr
- Preceded by: Ahmed Hassan al-Bakr
- Succeeded by: Izzat Ibrahim al-Douri

Member of the Regional Command of the Iraqi Regional Branch
- In office February 1964 – 9 April 2003

Personal details
- Born: Saddam Husayn Abd al-Majid al-Tikritiyy; 28 April 1937 (Note: Under his government, this date was his official date of birth. His real date of birth was never recorded, but it is believed to be between 1935 and 1939.) Al-Awja, Iraq
- Died: 30 December 2006 (aged 69) Baghdad, Iraq
- Cause of death: Executed by hanging
- Resting place: Al-Awja, Iraq
- Party: Ba'ath Party (1957–1966); Iraqi Ba'ath Party (1966–2006)
- Spouses: Sajida Talfah (m. 1958) Samira Shahbandar (m. 1986)
- Children: Uday; Qusay; Raghad; Rana; Hala; Ali
- Education: Cairo University; University of Baghdad
- Nickname: Abu Uday

Military service
- Allegiance: Ba'athist Iraq
- Branch/service: Iraqi Armed Forces
- Rank: Field Marshal
- Battles/wars: Second Iraqi–Kurdish War; Iran–Iraq War; Gulf War; 1991 Iraqi uprisings; Iraq War (POW) (executed); 2003 invasion of Iraq
- Criminal information
- Status: Executed by hanging
- Conviction: Crimes against humanity during the Dujail massacre
- Trial: Trial of Saddam Hussein
- Penalty: Death by hanging
- Reward amount: $25 million
- Wanted by: Federal government of the United States

Details
- Date apprehended: 13 December 2003
- Imprisoned at: Camp Cropper

Saddam Hussein Abd al-Majid al-Tikriti (Note: /səˈdɑːm huːˈseɪn/; Arabic: صدام حسين, Mesopotamian Arabic pronunciation: [sˤɐdˈdɑːm ɜħsɪe̯n]; also known mononymously as Saddam (Note: Saddam, pronounced [sˤɑdˈdæːm], is his personal name, and means the stubborn one or he who confronts in Arabic. Hussein (sometimes also transliterated as Hussayn or Hussain) is not a surname in the Western sense, but a patronymic, his father's given personal name; Abid al-Majid his grandfather's; al-Tikriti means he was born and raised in (or near) Tikrit. He was commonly referred to as Saddam Hussein, or Saddam for short. The observation that referring to the deposed Iraqi president as only Saddam is derogatory or inappropriate may be based on the assumption that Hussein is a family name: thus, The New York Times refers to him as "Mr. Hussein", while Encyclopædia Britannica uses just Saddam. A full discussion can be found here.)) (28 April 1937 – 30 December 2006) was an Iraqi politician and revolutionary who served as the fifth president of Iraq from 1979 until his overthrow in 2003. He also served as prime minister of Iraq from 1979 to 1991 and later from 1994 to 2003. He was a leading member of the revolutionary Arab Socialist Ba'ath Party, and later, the Baghdad-based Ba'ath Party and its regional organization, the Iraqi Ba'ath Party. The Iraqi Ba'ath Party, which initially espoused a mix of Arab nationalism and Arab socialism, quickly diverged into a right-wing ideology known as Saddamism.

Saddam was born in the village of Al-Awja, near Tikrit in northern Iraq, to a peasant Sunni Arab family. He joined the Arab Socialist Ba'ath Party in 1957, and the Baghdad-based Ba'ath Party and its regional organization, the Iraqi Ba'ath Party. He played a key role in the 17 July Revolution and was appointed vice president by Ahmed Hassan al-Bakr. During his time as vice president, Saddam nationalised the Iraq Petroleum Company, diversifying the Iraqi economy. He presided over the Second Iraqi–Kurdish War (1974–1975). Following al-Bakr's resignation in 1979, Saddam formally took power, although he had already been the de facto head of Iraq for several years. Positions of power in the country were mostly filled with Sunni Arabs, a minority that made up only a fifth of the population.

Upon taking office, Saddam instituted the Ba'ath Party Purge. Saddam ordered the 1980 invasion of Iran in a purported effort to capture Iran's Arab-majority Khuzistan province and thwart Iranian attempts to export their own 1979 revolution. The Iran–Iraq War ended after nearly eight years in a ceasefire after a gruelling stalemate that took somewhere around a total of a million lives and economic losses of $561 billion in Iraq. Later, Saddam accused its ally Kuwait of slant-drilling Iraqi oil fields and occupied Kuwait, initiating the Gulf War (1990–1991). Iraq was defeated by a multinational coalition led by the United States. The United Nations subsequently placed sanctions against Iraq. He suppressed the 1991 Iraqi uprisings of the Kurds and Shia Muslims, which sought to gain independence or overthrow the government. Saddam adopted an anti-American stance and established the Faith Campaign, pursuing an Islamist agenda in Iraq. Saddam's rule was marked by numerous human rights abuses, including an estimated 250,000 arbitrary deaths and disappearances.

In 2003, the United States and its allies invaded Iraq, falsely accusing Saddam of developing weapons of mass destruction and of having ties with al-Qaeda. The Ba'ath Party was banned and Saddam went into hiding. After his capture on 13 December 2003, his trial took place under the Iraqi Interim Government. On 5 November 2006, Saddam was convicted by the Iraqi High Tribunal of crimes against humanity related to the 1982 killing of 148 Iraqi Shi'a and sentenced to death by hanging. He was executed on 30 December 2006.

Saddam has been accused of running a repressive authoritarian government, which several analysts have described as totalitarian, although the applicability of that label has been contested.

== Early life and education ==
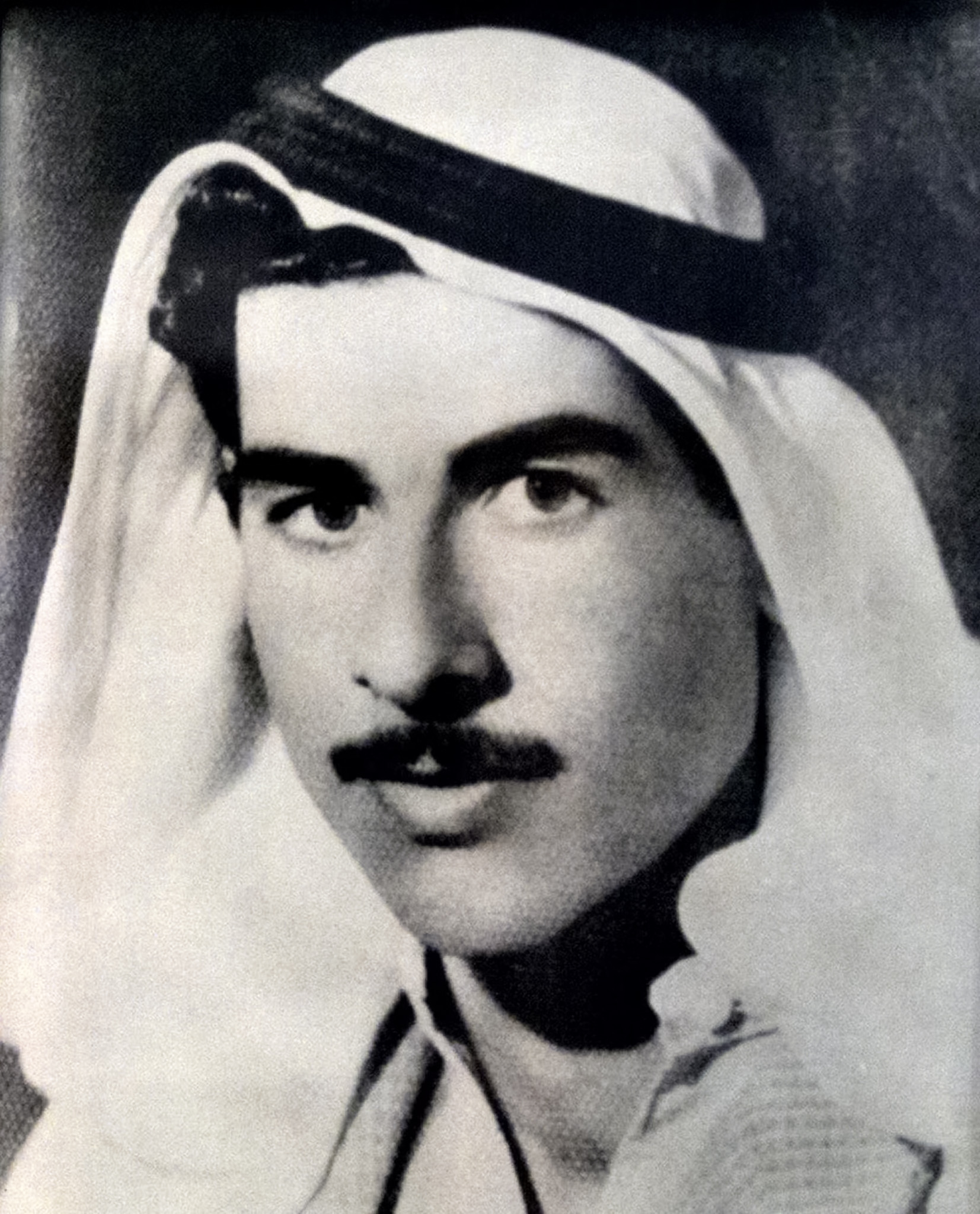
Saddam in his youth as a shepherd in his village, near Tikrit, 1956

Saddam Hussein Al-Majid Al-Tikriti was born on 28 April 1937 in al-Awja, a small village near Tikrit, to a peasant Sunni Arab family from the Al-Bejat clan of the Bedouin Al-Bu Nasir tribe. His father, Hussein Abd al-Majid, was from the Al-Majid branch of the Al-Bejat clan, while his mother Subha Tulfah al-Mussalat was granddaughter of Mussallat bin Omar Al-Nasiri, a tribal leader of the Al-Bu Nasir tribe and an opponent of the Ottoman rule in Iraq.

Saddam's name means "the fighter who stands steadfast". His father died before his birth. This made Saddam's mother, Subha, so depressed that she unsuccessfully attempted to abort her pregnancy and commit suicide. Saddam's mother did not want anything to do with him, and Saddam was eventually taken in by an uncle. His stepfather, Ibrahim al-Hassan, treated Saddam harshly after his return, and (according to a psychological profile created by the CIA) beat him regularly, sometimes to wake him up. At around the age of 10, Saddam fled the family and returned to live in Baghdad with his uncle Khairallah Talfah, who became a fatherly figure to Saddam. Talfah, the father of Saddam's future wife, was a devout Sunni Muslim and a veteran of the 1941 Anglo-Iraqi War between Iraqi nationalists and the United Kingdom, which remained a major colonial power in the region. He was reported to have served five years in prison for his role in fighting against Great Britain, and often mentored and told tales of his exploits to the young Saddam. Talfah was appointed the mayor of Baghdad during Saddam's time in power, until his notorious corruption compelled Saddam to force him out of office.

Later in his life, relatives from his native city became some of his closest advisors and supporters. Under the guidance of his uncle, he attended a nationalistic high school in Baghdad. After secondary school, Saddam studied at an Iraqi law school for three years, dropping out in 1957 at the age of 20 to join the revolutionary pan-Arab Ba'ath Party, of which his uncle was a supporter. During this time, Saddam apparently saw himself as a secondary school teacher. Ba'athist ideology originated in Syria and the Ba'ath Party had a large following in Syria at the time, but in 1955 there were fewer than 300 Ba'ath Party members in Iraq, and it is believed that Saddam's primary reason for joining the party as opposed to the more established Iraqi nationalist parties was his familial connection to Ahmed Hassan al-Bakr and other leading Ba'athists through his uncle. The pan-Arab nationalism of Gamal Abdel Nasser in Egypt profoundly influenced young Ba'athists like Saddam. The rise of Nasser foreshadowed a wave of revolutions throughout the Middle East in the 1950s and 1960s, with the collapse of the monarchies of Iraq, Egypt, and Libya. Nasser inspired nationalists throughout the Middle East by fighting the British and the French during the Suez Crisis of 1956, modernizing Egypt, and uniting the Arab world politically.

== Rise to power ==
=== Assassination attempt on Qasim ===
In 1958, the Ba'ath Party was originally represented in Abdul-Karim Qasim's cabinet, the prime minister of Iraq and its de factor leader. However, Qasim—reluctant to join Nasser's newly formed union between Egypt and Syria—sided with various groups within Iraq (notably the social democrats and the Iraqi Communist Party) that told him such an action would be dangerous. Instead, Qasim adopted a wataniyah policy of "Iraq First". To strengthen his own position within the government, Qasim also had an alliance with the Iraqi Communist Party (ICP), which was opposed to the notion of pan-Arabism. His policies angered several pan-Arab organizations, including the Ba'ath Party, which later began plotting to assassinate Qasim at Al-Rashid Street on 7 October 1959 and take power. Saddam was recruited to the assassination conspiracy by its ring-leader, Abdul Karim al-Shaikhly, after one of the would-be assassins left. During the ambush, Saddam (who was only supposed to provide cover) began shooting prematurely, which disorganised the whole operation. Qasim's chauffeur was killed and Qasim was hit in the arm and shoulder. The assassins thought they had killed Qasim and quickly retreated to their headquarters, but Qasim survived. Saddam himself is not believed to have received any training outside of Iraq, as he was a late addition to the assassination team.

Richard Sale of United Press International (UPI), citing former United States diplomat and intelligence officials, Adel Darwish, and other experts, reported that the unsuccessful assassination attempt on Qasim was a collaboration between the United States Central Intelligence Agency (CIA) and Egyptian intelligence. Pertinent contemporary records relating to CIA operations in Iraq have remained classified or heavily redacted, thus "allow[ing] for plausible deniability." It is generally accepted that Egypt, in some capacity, was involved in the assassination attempt, and that "[t]he United States was working with Nasser on some level."

At the time of the attack, the Ba'ath Party had fewer than 1,000 members; however, the failed assassination attempt led to widespread exposure for Saddam and the Ba'ath within Iraq, where both had previously languished in obscurity, and later became a crucial part of Saddam's public image during his tenure as president of Iraq. Kanan Makiya recounts:

The man and the myth merge in this episode. His biography—and Iraqi television, which stages the story ad nauseam—tells of his familiarity with guns from the age of ten; his fearlessness and loyalty to the party during the 1959 operation; his bravery in saving his comrades by commandeering a car at gunpoint; the bullet that was gouged out of his flesh under his direction in hiding; the iron discipline that led him to draw a gun on weaker comrades who would have dropped off a seriously wounded member of the hit team at a hospital; the calculating shrewdness that helped him save himself minutes before the police broke in leaving his wounded comrades behind; and finally the long trek of a wounded man from house to house, city to town, across the desert to refuge in Syria.

=== Exile to the United Arab Republic ===
Michel Aflaq, the leader of the Ba'athist movement, organized the expulsion of leading Iraqi Ba'athist members, such as Fuad al-Rikabi, on the grounds that the party should not have initiated the attempt on Qasim's life. At the same time, Aflaq secured seats in the Iraqi Ba'ath leadership for his supporters, one of them being Saddam.

The assassins, including Saddam, all eventually escaped to Cairo, United Arab Republic, "where they enjoyed Nasser's protection for the remainder of Qasim's tenure in power." Saddam initially escaped to Syria and then to Egypt itself in February 1960, and he continued to live there until 1963, graduating from high school in 1961 and unsuccessfully pursuing a law degree at Cairo Law School (1962–1963). It is possible that Saddam visited the U.S. embassy in Cairo during his exile, and some evidence suggests that he was "in frequent contact with US officials and intelligence agents." A former high-ranking U.S. official told historians Marion Farouk–Sluglett and Peter Sluglett that Iraqi Ba'athists, including Saddam, "had made contact with the American authorities in the late 1950s and early 1960s."

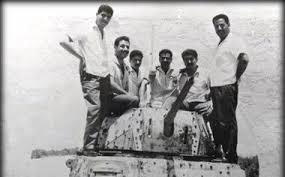
Saddam and other Ba'athists posing on top of a tank after a successful coup in February 1963

Army officers with ties to the Ba'ath Party overthrew and killed Qasim in the Ramadan Revolution coup of February 1963; long suspected to be supported by the CIA, however, pertinent contemporary documents relating to the CIA's operations in Iraq have remained classified by the U.S. government, although the Ba'athists are documented to have maintained supportive relationships with U.S. officials before, during, and after the coup. Ba'athist leaders were appointed to the cabinet and Abdul Salam Arif became president. Arif dismissed and arrested the Ba'athist leaders later that year in the November 1963 Iraqi coup d'état. Being exiled in Egypt at the time, Saddam played no role in the 1963 coup or the brutal anti-communist purge that followed; although he returned to Iraq after the coup, becoming a key organizer within the Ba'ath Party's civilian wing upon his return. Unlike during the Qasim years, Saddam remained in Iraq following Arif's anti-Ba'athist purge in November 1963, and became involved in planning to assassinate Arif. In marked contrast to Qasim, Saddam knew that he faced no death penalty from Arif's government and knowingly accepted the risk of being arrested rather than fleeing to Syria again. Saddam was arrested in October 1964 and served approximately two years in prison before escaping in 1966. In 1966, Ahmed Hassan al-Bakr appointed him Deputy Secretary of the Regional Command. Saddam, who would prove to be a skilled organizer, revitalized the party. He was elected to the Regional Command, as the story goes, with help from Michel Aflaq—the founder of Ba'athist thought. In September 1966, Saddam initiated an extraordinary challenge to Syrian domination of the Ba'ath Party in response to the Marxist takeover of the Syrian Ba'ath earlier that year, resulting in the Party's formalized split into two separate factions. Saddam then created a Ba'athist security service, which he alone controlled.

=== 1968 coup ===
In July 1968, Saddam participated in a bloodless coup led by Ahmed Hassan al-Bakr that overthrew Abdul Rahman Arif, Salam Arif's brother and successor. While Saddam's role in the coup was not largely significant (except in the official account), Saddam planned and carried out the subsequent purge of the non-Ba'athist faction led by Prime Minister Abdul Razzaq an-Naif, whose support had been essential to the coup's success. According to a semi-official biography, Saddam personally led Naif at gunpoint to the plane that escorted him out of Iraq. Arif was given refuge in London and then Istanbul. Al-Bakr was named president and Saddam was named his deputy, and deputy chairman of the Ba'athist Revolutionary Command Council. According to biographers, Saddam never forgot the tensions within the first Ba'athist government, which formed the basis for his measures to promote Ba'ath party unity as well as his resolve to maintain power and programs to ensure social stability. Although Saddam was al-Bakr's deputy, he was a strong behind-the-scenes party politician. Al-Bakr was the older and more prestigious of the two, but by 1969 Saddam had become the moving force behind the party.

== Vice presidency (1968–1979) ==
=== Political program ===
In the late 1960s and early 1970s, as vice chairman of the Revolutionary Command Council, formally al-Bakr's second-in-command, Saddam built a reputation as a progressive, effective politician. At this time, he moved up the ranks in the new government by aiding attempts to strengthen and unify the Ba'ath party and taking a leading role in addressing the country's major domestic problems and expanding the party's following.

At the center of this strategy was Iraq's oil. On 1 June 1972, Saddam oversaw the seizure of international oil interests, which, at the time, dominated the country's oil sector. A year later, world oil prices rose dramatically as a result of the 1973 energy crisis, and skyrocketing revenues enabled Saddam to expand his agenda. Saddam subsequently implemented a national infrastructure campaign that made progress in building roads, promoting mining, and developing other industries. Electricity was brought to nearly every city in Iraq, and many outlying areas. Before the 1970s, most of Iraq's people lived in the countryside and roughly two-thirds were peasants. This number would decrease quickly during the 1970s. He nationalized independent banks, eventually leaving the banking system insolvent due to inflation and bad loans.

Saddam focused on fostering loyalty to the Ba'athists in the rural areas. After nationalizing foreign oil interests, Saddam supervised the modernization of the countryside, mechanizing agriculture on a large scale, and distributing land to peasant farmers. The Ba'athists established farm cooperatives and the government also doubled expenditures for agricultural development in 1974–1975.

By the late 1970s, the nationalization of the Iraq's oil sector under Saddam, combined with high fuel prices between 1974 and 1975, alongside the middle class divided by their own profession, led to oil revenues becoming a major source of Iraq's economy and had made it less diversified.

The oil revenue benefited Saddam politically. According to The Economist, "Much as Adolf Hitler won early praise for galvanizing German industry, ending mass unemployment and building autobahns, Saddam earned admiration abroad for his deeds. He had a good instinct for what the "Arab street" demanded, following the decline in Egyptian leadership brought about by the trauma of Israel's six-day victory in the 1967 war, the death of the pan-Arabist hero, Gamal Abdel Nasser, in 1970, and the "traitorous" drive by his successor, Anwar Sadat, to sue for peace with the Jewish state. Saddam's self-aggrandizing propaganda, with himself posing as the defender of Arabism against Zionist or Persian intruders, was heavy-handed, but consistent as a drumbeat. It helped, of course, that his mukhabarat (secret police) put dozens of Arab news editors, writers and artists on the payroll."

=== Foreign relations ===
Saddam sought to have Iraq play a leading role in the Middle East. In 1972, Saddam signed a 15-year Treaty of Friendship and Cooperation with the Soviet Union. Arms were sent along with several thousand advisers. According to historian Charles R. H. Tripp, the treaty upset "the US-sponsored security system established as part of the Cold War in the Middle East. It appeared that any enemy of the Baghdad regime was a potential ally of the United States." In response, the US covertly financed Kurdish rebels led by Mustafa Barzani during the Second Iraqi–Kurdish War; the Kurds were defeated in 1975, leading to the forcible relocation of hundreds of thousands of Kurdish civilians. A 1978 crackdown on Iraqi Communists and a shift of trade toward the West strained Iraqi relations with the Soviet Union; Iraq then took on a more Western orientation until the Gulf War in 1991.

After the oil crisis of 1973, France had changed to a more pro-Arab policy and was accordingly rewarded by Saddam with closer ties. Saddam's rare trips abroad included many Western countries. His visit to Spain took place in December 1974, when the Caudillo of Spain, Francisco Franco, invited him to Madrid and he visited Granada, Córdoba and Toledo. In September 1975 he met with Prime Minister Jacques Chirac in Paris, France. Saddam's 1975 visit further cemented close ties with French business and ruling political circles.

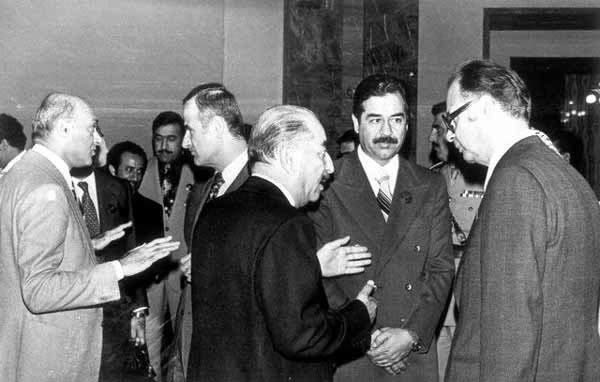
Saddam and al-Bakr, de jure president of Iraq alongside Hafez al-Assad of Syria at an Arab League summit in Baghdad in November 1978

Relations between Iraq and Egypt violently ruptured in 1977, when the two nations broke relations with each other following Iraq's criticism of Egyptian President Anwar Sadat's peace initiatives with Israel. In 1978, Baghdad hosted an Arab League summit that condemned and ostracized Egypt for accepting the Camp David Accords. Saddam led Arab opposition to the Camp David Accords.

==== Peace treaty with Iran ====
A long-standing territorial dispute had been engaged between Iraq and Iran over the Shatt al-Arab waterway, in which both countries border. The 1975 Algiers Agreement, also known as the Algiers Accord, aimed to address the dispute, was signed on 6 March 1975. It was mediated by the then president of Algeria, Houari Boumediene. Saddam agreed to partial control of the waterway by Iran's military and Iran stopped aided Kurdish rebels in Iraq.

=== Succession ===
In 1976, Saddam rose to the position of general in the Iraqi armed forces, and rapidly became the strongman of the government. As the ailing, elderly al-Bakr became unable to execute his duties, Saddam took on an increasingly prominent role as the face of the government both internally and externally. He was the de facto leader of Iraq some years before he formally came to power in 1979.

In 1979, al-Bakr started to make treaties with Syria, also under Ba'athist leadership, that would lead to unification between the two countries. Syrian President Hafez al-Assad would become deputy leader in a union, and this would drive Saddam to obscurity. Saddam acted to secure his grip on power by forcing the ailing al-Bakr to resign on 16 July 1979, and formally assumed the presidency.

== Presidency (1979–2003) ==
=== Consolidation of power ===
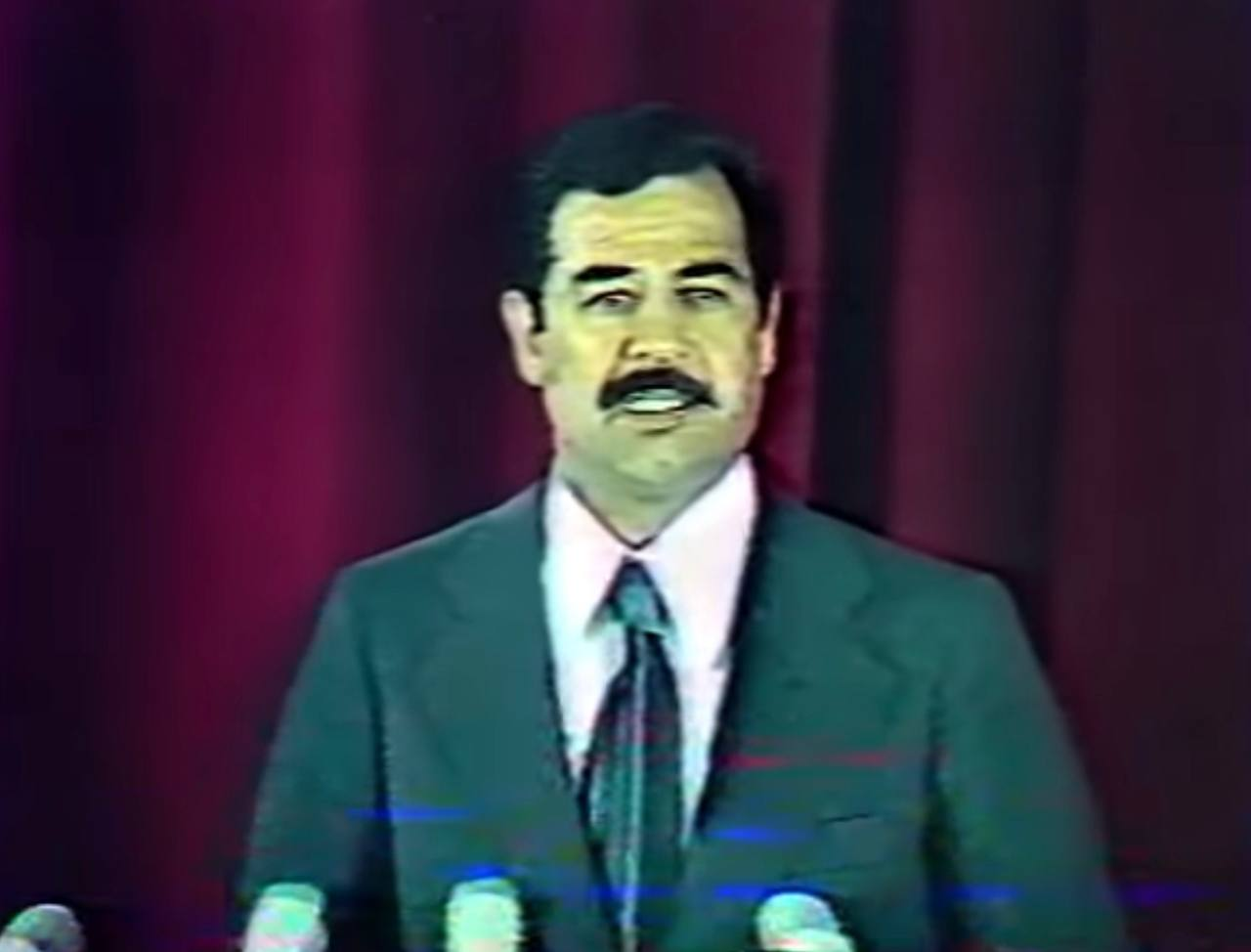
Saddam speech during 1979 purge of the Ba'ath party

The first signs of Saddam's consolidation of power in Iraq began when secretary-general of the Ba'ath Party, Muhyi Abd al-Hussein Mashhadi, was replaced by someone closer to Saddam. Sa'dun Shakir, one of Saddam's cousins, also took control of the Directorate of Intelligence. Saddam convened an assembly of Ba'ath party leaders on 22 July 1979. During the assembly, which he ordered videotaped, Saddam claimed to have found a fifth column within the ruling party and directed Muhyi Abdul-Hussein to read out a confession and the names of 68 alleged co-conspirators. These members were labelled "disloyal" and were removed from the room one by one and taken into custody. After the list was read, Saddam congratulated those still seated in the room for their past and future loyalty. The 68 people arrested at the meeting were subsequently tried together and found guilty of treason; 22 were sentenced to execution. Other high-ranking members of the party formed the firing squad.

A second round of purges took place in June 1982, when half of the sixteen RCC members who had survived the 1979 "countercoup" were removed from power. Large number of Shias were removed from the regime. Senior government, military, and security roles were predominantly filled by Arab Sunni Muslims, a minority that made up about a fourth of the population.

==== Paramilitary and police organizations ====
Iraq faced the prospect of régime change from two Shia factions — Dawa and SCIRI which aspired to model Iraq on its neighbour Iran as a Shia theocracy. A separate threat to Iraq came from parts of the ethnic Kurdish population of northern Iraq which opposed being part of an Iraqi state and favored independence, an ongoing ideology which had preceded Ba'ath Party rule. To alleviate the threat of revolution, Saddam afforded certain benefits to potentially hostile population. Membership in the Ba'ath Party remained open to all Iraqi citizens regardless of background, and repressive measures were taken against its opponents.

"There is a feeling that at least three million Iraqis are watching the eleven million others."

— "A European diplomat", quoted in The New York Times, April 3, 1984.

The major instruments for accomplishing this control were the paramilitary and police organizations. Beginning in 1974, Taha Yassin Ramadan, a close associate of Saddam, commanded the Popular Army, which had responsibility for internal security. As the Ba'ath Party's paramilitary, the People's Army acted as a counterweight against any coup attempts by the regular armed forces. In addition to the People's Army, the Department of General Intelligence was the most notorious arm of the state-security system, feared for its use of torture and assassination. Barzan Ibrahim al-Tikriti, Saddam's younger half-brother, commanded Mukhabarat. Foreign observers believed that from 1982 this department operated both at home and abroad in its mission to seek out and eliminate Saddam's perceived opponents.

Saddam was notable for using terror against his own people. The Economist described Saddam as "one of the last of the 20th century's great dictators, but not the least in terms of egotism, or cruelty, or morbid will to power." Saddam's regime brought about the deaths of at least 250,000 Iraqis and committed war crimes in Iran, Kuwait, and Saudi Arabia. Human Rights Watch and Amnesty International issued regular reports of widespread imprisonment and torture. Conversely, Saddam used Iraq's oil wealth to develop an extensive patronage system for the regime's supporters. Although Saddam is often described as a totalitarian leader, Joseph Sassoon notes that there are important differences between Saddam's repression and the totalitarianism practiced by Adolf Hitler and Joseph Stalin, particularly with regard to freedom of movement and freedom of religion.

=== Domestic policy ===
==== Economy and infrastructure ====
Although initially committed to centralized planning and nationalization—particularly in the oil sector—Saddam experimented with privatization, partial deregulation, and limited market liberalization in the late 1980s. The Iran–Iraq War devastated Iraq's economy, causing an estimated US$120 billion in damages and leaving the country with around $90 billion in debt, including approximately $40 billion owed to Saudi Arabia and Kuwait alone. Following the Gulf War and the imposition of UN sanctions in the 1990s, the Iraqi economy had sharply declined, and the system increasingly shifted toward crony capitalism.

Overall, Saddam's government invested heavily in infrastructure projects, such as roads, bridges, and public buildings. Saddam implemented a national infrastructure campaign that made progress in building roads, promoting mining, and developing other industries. Electricity was also brought to nearly every city in Iraq, and many outlying areas. Iraq created one of the most modernized public-health systems in the Middle East, earning Saddam an award from the United Nations Educational, Scientific and Cultural Organization (UNESCO). He established one hospital, specially for treatment of children with Cerebral palsy. Saddam's government also underwent a large campaign to beautify Baghdad by erecting statues and monuments. The government also supported families of soldiers, granted free hospitalization to everyone, and gave subsidies to farmers.

The government invested in building schools, and literacy rates in Iraq increased significantly during his rule. Saddam established and controlled the "National Campaign for the Eradication of Illiteracy" and the campaign for "Compulsory Free Education in Iraq," and largely under his auspices, the government established universal free schooling up to the highest education levels and hundreds of thousands learned to read in the years following the initiation of the program.

==== Women's rights ====
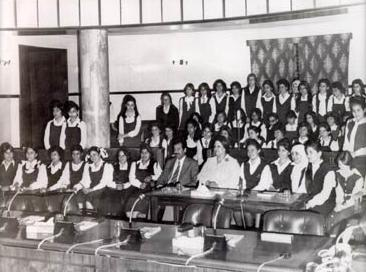
Saddam promoting women's education and literacy

Saddam personally emphasized his full support for women's emancipation. Women were strongly encouraged to pursue education and join the workforce, and many rose to high-ranking positions in government, medicine, and academia. The Ba'ath Party is also known to have "popularized women's education" during their rule, leading Iraq to achieve one of the highest female literacy rates among Muslim-majority countries at the time. Saddam's government passed labor and employment laws that guaranteed equal pay, six months of fully paid maternity leave, and legal protections against sexual harassment. According to PeaceWomen, the rights of female workers in Ba'athist Iraq rivaled those of the United States during the same period.

In 1980, Saddam's government granted women full suffrage and the right to run for office. By the late 1970s and into the 1980s, women in Iraq held significant roles in society, accounting for 46% of all teachers, 29% of doctors, 46% of dentists and 70% of pharmacists. Women also constituted 40% of the civil service at one point in the 1980s. Legal reforms were enacted to grant equal rights in marriage, divorce, inheritance, and child custody, and Iraqi women could pass citizenship to their children even if married to non-Iraqis. Access to higher education was expanded, and women were given the same academic opportunities as men.

According to a report in 1985 by The New York Times: "Iraqi women, historically among the most emancipated in the Arab world, hold jobs in all the professions, dress as they please, vote and hold more than 10 percent of the seats in the National Assembly. At the University of Baghdad, 55 percent of the enrollment is female. Day care is provided by the state free of charge, and with the war, women have taken on more traditional men's jobs and now make up 25 percent of the entire work force".

=== Wealth ===
Saddam exercised centralized control over Iraq's financial resources, including oil revenues, foreign exchange reserves, and state-controlled enterprises and diverted significant sums of Iraqi state funds through opaque financial networks under his authority. Prior to the Gulf War, Saddam and his inner circle diverted billions of dollars into foreign accounts via a network of front companies and intermediaries used to move funds through international financial centers, including banks in Europe and the Middle East. As much as several billion U.S. dollars may have been transferred abroad; however, the precise total was uncertain due to the secrecy of the transactions and the reliance on fragmentary intelligence. The funds served to safeguard regime assets against sanctions and potential military defeat, as well as financing procurement networks operating outside international oversight. Early in his presidency, Hussein donated hundreds of thousands of dollars to a church in Detroit and received a key to the city.

In the aftermath of the 2003 invasion of Iraq and the fall of Saddam's government, Iraqi authorities initiated efforts to identify and repatriate assets believed to have been transferred abroad during his rule. In 2007, the Iraqi government formally requested assistance from France in locating funds allegedly deposited in French financial institutions.

Saddam once owned a trust fund known as Montana Management, which had a 2% holding in Lagardère Group; however all of its holdings—including its $90 million stake—were frozen following the 1990 Iraqi invasion of Kuwait.

=== Iran–Iraq War: 1980–1988 ===
==== Background ====
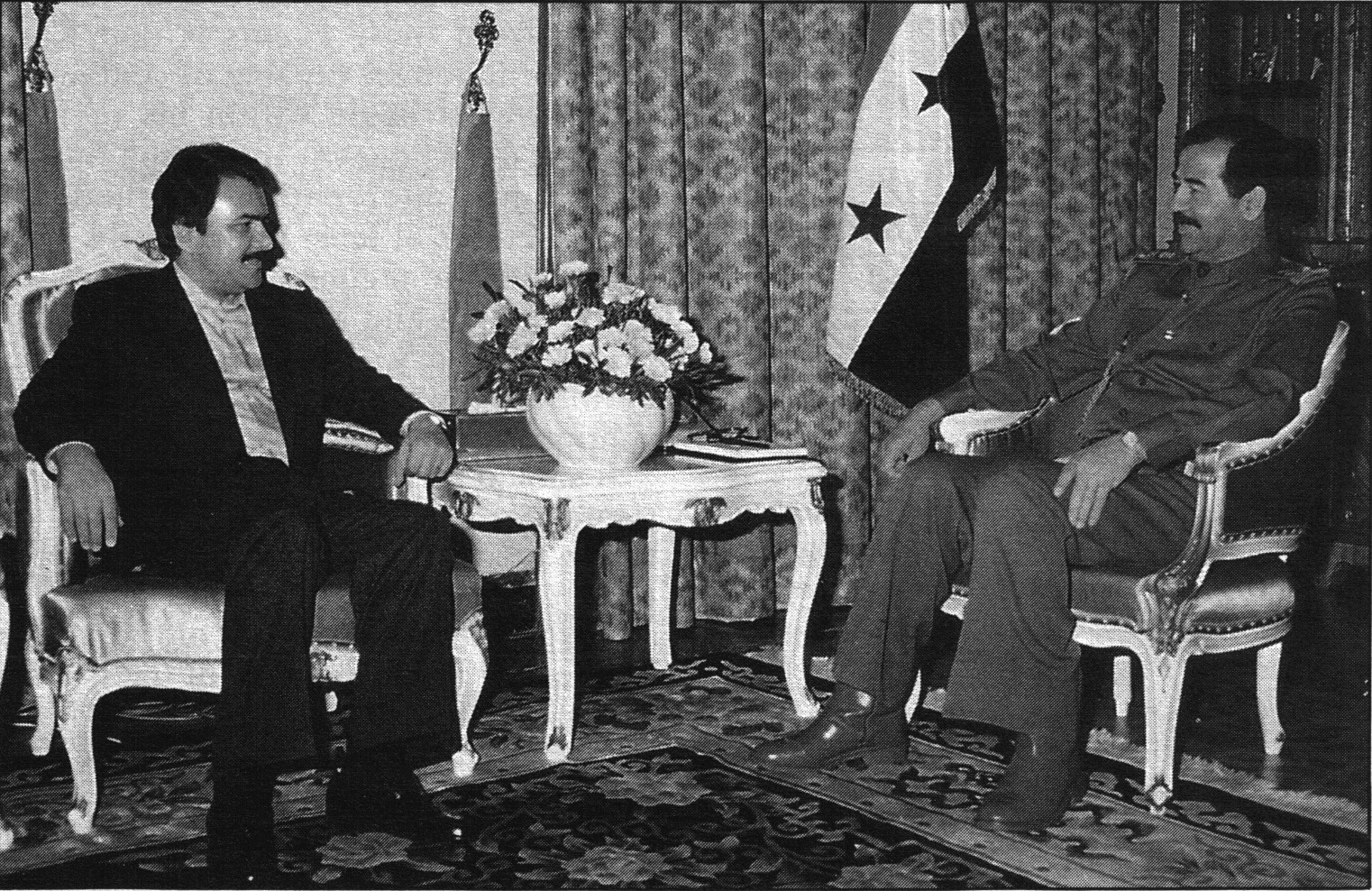
Saddam and Massoud Rajavi, the leader of People's Mojahedin Organization of Iran, 1987

In early 1979, Iran's Shah Mohammad Reza Pahlavi's Pahlavi dynasty were overthrown by the Islamic Revolution, thus giving way to an Islamic republic led by Ayatollah Ruhollah Khomeini. The influence of revolutionary Shia Islam grew apace in the region, particularly in countries with large Shia populations, especially Iraq. Saddam feared that the radical Islamic ideas—hostile to his secular rule—were rapidly spreading inside his country among the majority Shia population.Despite Saddam's fears of massive unrest, Iran's attempts to export its Islamic Revolution were largely unsuccessful in rallying support from Shias in Iraq and the Gulf states. Most Iraqi Shias, who comprised the majority of the Iraqi Armed Forces, chose their own country over their Shia Iranian coreligionists during the war that ensued.

There had also been bitter enmity between Saddam and Khomeini since the 1970s. Khomeini, having been exiled from Iran in 1964, took up residence in Iraq, at the Shia holy city of Najaf. There he involved himself with Iraqi Shias and developed a strong religious and political following against the Iranian government, which Saddam tolerated. When Khomeini began to urge the Shias there to overthrow Saddam and under pressure from the Shah, who had agreed to a rapprochement between Iraq and Iran in 1975, Saddam agreed to expel Khomeini in 1978 to France. Here, Khomeini gained media connections and collaborated with a much larger Iranian community, to his advantage. After Khomeini gained power, skirmishes between Iraq and revolutionary Iran occurred for ten months over the sovereignty of the disputed Shatt al-Arab waterway, which divides the two countries. During this period, Saddam publicly maintained that it was in Iraq's interest not to engage with Iran, and that it was in the interests of both nations to maintain peaceful relations.

The outbreak of the war in September 1980 was preceded by a long period of tension between the two countries throughout 1979 and 1980, including frequent border skirmishes, calls by Khomeini for the Shia Muslims in Iraq to revolt against the ruling Ba'ath Party, and allegations of Iraqi support for ethnic separatists in Iran. There were frequent clashes along the Iran–Iraq border throughout 1980, with Iraq publicly complaining of at least 544 incidents and Iran citing at least 797 violations of its border and airspace. On 1 April 1980, the Islamic Dawa Party, an Iraqi Islamist group with supportive ties to Iran, attempted to assassinate Tariq Aziz, Iraq's then deputy prime minister at the University of Baghdad campus, in retaliation for a 30 March decree declaring "membership of Dawa [to be] a capital offense". On 30 April, Iraq organized an attack on the Iranian embassy in London. On 10 September 1980, Iraq forcibly reclaimed territories in Zain al-Qaws and Saif Saad that it had been promised under the terms of the 1975 Algiers Agreement but that Iran had never handed over, leading to both Iran and Iraq voiding the treaty, on 14 September and 17 September, respectively.

==== Warfare ====
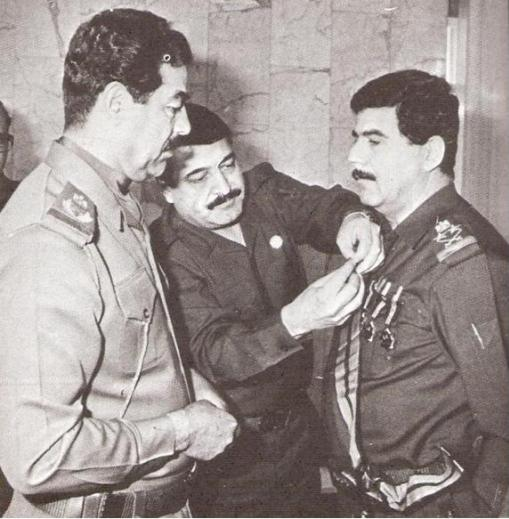
Adnan Khairallah (1940–1989), the Defence Minister, being awarded by Saddam.

Iraq invaded Iran on 22 September 1980, first launching airstrikes on numerous targets in Iran, including the Mehrabad Airport of Tehran, before occupying the oil-rich Iranian province of Khuzestan, which also has a sizable Arab minority. The invasion was initially successful, as Iraq captured more than 25,900 km^{2} (10,000 sq mi) of Iranian territory by 5 December 1980. With the support of other Arab states, the United States, and Europe, and with major financial support from the Arab states of the Persian Gulf, Saddam became "defender of the Arab world" against a revolutionary, fundamentalist Shia Iran. Consequently, many viewed Iraq as "an agent of the civilized world."

The blatant disregard of international law and violations of international borders were ignored. Instead Iraq received economic and military support from its allies, who overlooked Saddam's use of chemical warfare against the Kurds and the Iranians, in addition to Iraq's efforts to develop nuclear weapons. In the first days of the war, there was heavy ground fighting around strategic ports as Iraq launched an attack on Khuzestan. After making some initial gains, Iraq's troops began to suffer losses from human wave attacks by Iran. Meanwhile, Saddam's efforts to develop nuclear weapons faced a setback when Iraq's nuclear reactor was destroyed on 7 June 1981 by an Israeli air attack. By 1982, Iraq was on the defensive and looking for ways to end the war. Iraq quickly found itself bogged down in one of the longest and most destructive wars of attrition of the 20th century.

During the war, Iraq used chemical weapons against Iranian forces fighting on the southern front and Kurdish separatists who were attempting to open up a northern front in Iraq with the help of Iran. Tariq Aziz later acknowledged Iraq's use of chemical weapons against Iran, but said that Iran had used them against Iraq first. The Iranians, demanding that the international community should force Iraq to pay war reparations to Iran, refused any suggestions for a cease-fire. Despite several calls for a ceasefire by the United Nations Security Council, hostilities continued until 20 August 1988. It was not until 20 July 1988 that Iran accepted Resolution 598, mainly due to poor morale, economic collapse, and Iraq's highly successful Tawakalna ala Allah Operations, which reversed all of Iran's territorial gains and effectively brought the war to an end. Encyclopædia Britannica states: "Estimates of total casualties range from 1,000,000 to twice that number. The number killed on both sides was perhaps 500,000, with Iran suffering the greatest losses." Neither side had achieved what they had originally desired and the borders were left nearly unchanged. The southern, oil rich and prosperous areas were almost completely destroyed and were left at pre-1979 border, while Iran managed to make some small gains on its borders in the Northern Kurdish area. Both economies, previously healthy and expanding, were left in ruins. Saddam borrowed tens of billions of dollars from other Arab states and a few billions from elsewhere. This backfired on Iraq and Arab states, as Khomeini was widely perceived as a hero by his supporters for managing to defend Iran and maintain the war with little foreign support against the heavily backed Iraq and only managed to boost Islamic radicalism not only within the Arab states, but within Iraq itself, creating new tensions between the Sunni Ba'ath Party and the majority Shia population. Faced with rebuilding Iraq's infrastructure and internal resistance, Saddam desperately re-sought cash, this time for postwar reconstruction.

==== Anfal campaign: 1986–1989 ====
The Anfal campaign was a campaign that took place during the war against the Kurdish people and many others in Kurdish regions of Iraq led by the government and headed by Ali Hassan al-Majid. The campaign takes its name from Qur'anic chapter 8 (al-ʾanfāl), which was used as a code name by the administration for a series of attacks against the peshmerga rebels and the mostly Kurdish civilian population of rural Northern Iraq, conducted between 1986 and 1989 culminating in 1988. The campaign was in retaliation to Kurd's support for Iran and their rebellion. This campaign also targeted Shabaks and Yazidis, Assyrians, Turkoman people and many villages belonging to these ethnic groups were also destroyed. Human Rights Watch estimates that between 50,000 and 100,000 people were killed. It considers the campaign as an act of genocide. Some Kurdish sources put the number higher, estimating that 182,000 Kurds were killed.

On 16 March 1988, the Kurdish town of Halabja was attacked with a mix of mustard gas and nerve agents, killing between 3,200 and 5,000 people, and injuring 7,000 to 10,000 more, mostly civilians. The attack occurred in conjunction with the Anfal campaign designed to reassert central control of the mostly Kurdish population of areas of northern Iraq and defeat the Kurdish peshmerga rebel forces. Following the incident, the U.S. State Department took the official position that Iran was partly to blame for the Halabja massacre. A study by the Defense Intelligence Agency held Iran responsible for the attack, an assessment that was subsequently used by the Central Intelligence Agency for much of the early 1990s. Despite this, few observers today doubt that it was Iraq that executed the Halabja massacre. According to Joost Hiltermann: "Analysis of thousands of captured Iraqi secret police documents and declassified U.S. government documents, as well as interviews with scores of Kurdish survivors, senior Iraqi defectors and retired U.S. intelligence officers, show (1) that Iraq carried out the attack on Halabja, and (2) that the United States, fully aware it was Iraq, accused Iran, Iraq's enemy in a fierce war, of being partly responsible for the attack."

==== International support and opposition ====
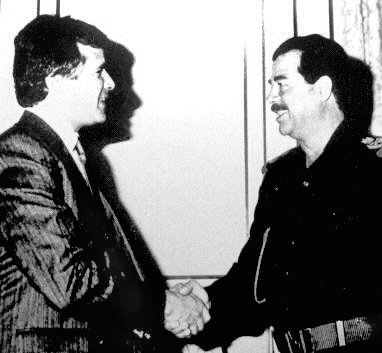
Saddam greeting Carlos Cardoen — a Chilean businessman who provided Iraq with weapons

Backed by the United States, the United Kingdom, several European nations, and the Arab states of the Persian Gulf, Saddam positioned himself as "the defender of the Arab world" against threats from then, Persia.The only exception was the Soviet Union. It initially refused to supply Iraq on the basis of neutrality in the conflict. Although in his memoirs, Mikhail Gorbachev claimed that Leonid Brezhnev refused to aid Saddam over infuriation of Saddam's treatment of Iraqi communists. However, by 1982, the Soviet Union began giving military aid to Saddam and in the final years (1986–1988), it actively supported Iraq.

In a U.S. bid to open full diplomatic relations with Iraq, the country was removed from the U.S list of State Sponsors of Terrorism in February 1982. Ostensibly, this was because of improvement in the regime's record, although former U.S. Assistant Secretary of Defense Noel Koch later stated, "No one had any doubts about [the Iraqis'] continued involvement in terrorism ... The real reason was to help them succeed in the war against Iran." Middle East special envoy Donald Rumsfeld met Saddam on 19–20 December 1983 at Baghdad. After which, Saddam sent his deputy Aziz to visit the United States in 1984. He was hosted by Ronald Reagan at the White House, along with then vice-president George H. W. Bush and succeeded in winning U.S support for Iraq.

The Soviet Union, France, and China together accounted for over 90% of the value of Iraq's arms imports between 1980 and 1988. While the U.S. supplied Iraq with arms, dual-use technology and economic aid, it was also involved in a covert and controversial illegal arms deal, providing sanctioned Iran with weaponry. This political scandal became known as the Iran–Contra affair. Saddam reached out to other Arab governments for cash and political support during the war, particularly after Iraq's oil industry severely suffered at the hands of the Iranian navy in the Persian Gulf.

Chemical weapons were developed by Iraq from materials and technology supplied primarily by West German companies as well as using dual-use technology. The United States government also supplied Iraq with "satellite photos showing Iranian deployments." This satellite imagery may have played a crucial role in blocking the Iranian invasion of Iraq in 1982. However, Saddam's government later blamed the Iraqi defeat in the First Battle of al-Faw in February 1986 on "misinformation from the U.S."

=== Gulf War: 1990–1991 ===
==== Tensions with Kuwait: 1988–1990 ====
The end of the war with Iran served to deepen latent tensions between Iraq and its wealthy neighbor Kuwait. Saddam urged the Kuwaitis to waive the Iraqi debt accumulated in the war, some $30 billion, but they refused. Saddam pushed oil-exporting countries to raise oil prices by cutting back production; Kuwait refused, then led the opposition in OPEC to the cuts that Saddam had requested. Kuwait was pumping large amounts of oil, and thus keeping prices low, when Iraq needed to sell high-priced oil from its wells to pay off its huge debt.

Saddam had consistently argued that Kuwait had historically been an integral part of Iraq, and had only come into being as a result of interference from the British government; echoing a belief that Iraqi nationalists had supported for the past fifty years. This belief was one of the few articles of faith uniting the political scene in a nation rife with sharp social, ethnic, religious, and ideological divides. The extent of Kuwaiti oil reserves also intensified tensions in the region. The oil reserves of Kuwait (with a population of 2 million next to Iraq's 25) were roughly equal to those of Iraq. Taken together, Iraq and Kuwait sat on top of some 20 percent of the world's known oil reserves; Saudi Arabia held another 25 percent. Saddam still had an experienced and well-equipped army, which he used to influence regional affairs. He later ordered troops to the Iraq–Kuwait border.

As Iraq–Kuwait relations rapidly deteriorated, Saddam was receiving conflicting information about how the US would respond to the prospects of an invasion. For one, Washington had been taking measures to cultivate a constructive relationship with Iraq for roughly a decade. The Reagan administration gave Iraq roughly $4 billion in agricultural credits to bolster it against Iran. Saddam's Iraq became "the third-largest recipient of US assistance." Reacting to Western criticism in April 1990, Saddam threatened to destroy half of Israel if it moved against Iraq. In May 1990, he criticized US support for Israel warning that "the US cannot maintain such a policy while professing friendship towards the Arabs." In July 1990 he threatened force against Kuwait and the UAE saying "The policies of some Arab rulers are American ... They are inspired by America to undermine Arab interests and security." The US sent warplanes and combat ships to the Persian Gulf in response to these threats.

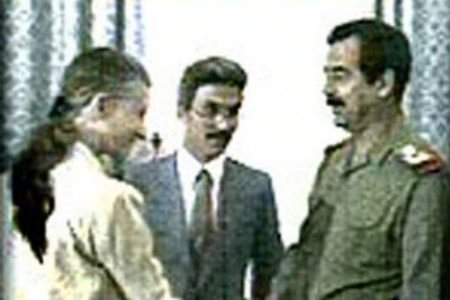
U.S. Ambassador to Iraq April Glaspie calls upon Saddam for an emergency meeting.

On 25 July 1990, Saddam summoned the US ambassador to Iraq, April Glaspie, for an emergency meeting where the Iraqi leader attacked American policy with regards to Kuwait and the United Arab Emirates. During the meeting, Glaspie stated that "we have no opinion on the Arab-Arab conflicts, like your border disagreement with Kuwait," which was interpreted as tacit approval for the invasion of Kuwait.

Saddam stated that he would attempt last-ditch negotiations with the Kuwaitis but Iraq "would not accept death." U.S. officials attempted to maintain a conciliatory line with Iraq, indicating that while George H. W. Bush and James Baker did not want force used, they would not take any position on the Iraq–Kuwait boundary dispute and did not want to become involved. Later, Iraq and Kuwait met for a final negotiation session, which failed. Saddam then sent his troops into Kuwait. As tensions between Washington and Saddam began to escalate, the Soviet Union, under Mikhail Gorbachev, strengthened its military relationship with the Iraqi leader, providing him military advisers, arms and aid.

==== Invasion of Kuwait ====
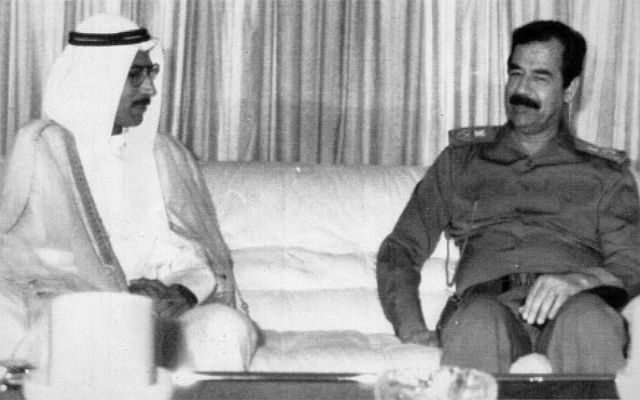
Saddam welcomes Colonel Alaa Hussein Ali, Prime Minister of Kuwait Provisional Free Government for unification talks in Baghdad, 1990

On 2 August 1990, Saddam invaded Kuwait, initially claiming assistance to "Kuwaiti revolutionaries", thus sparking an international crisis. On 4 August an Iraqi-backed "Provisional Government of Free Kuwait" was proclaimed, but a total lack of legitimacy and support for it led to an 8 August announcement of a "merger" of the two countries. On 28 August Kuwait formally became the 19th Governorate of Iraq. Just two years after the 1988 Iraq and Iran truce, "Saddam did what his Gulf patrons had earlier paid him to prevent." Having removed the threat of Iranian fundamentalism he "overran Kuwait and confronted his Gulf neighbors in the name of Arab nationalism and Islam."

When later asked why he invaded Kuwait, Saddam first claimed that it was because Kuwait was rightfully Iraq's 19th province and then said "When I get something into my head I act. That's just the way I am." Saddam could pursue such military aggression with a "military machine paid for in large part by the tens of billions of dollars Kuwait and the Gulf states had poured into Iraq and the weapons and technology provided by the Soviet Union, Germany, and France." It was revealed during his 2003–2004 interrogation that in addition to economic disputes, an insulting exchange between the Kuwaiti emir Jaber al-Ahmd Al Sabah and Iraq's foreign minister – during which Saddam claimed that the emir stated his intention to turn "every Iraqi woman into a $10 prostitute" by ruining Iraq financially – was a decisive factor in triggering the invasion. Shortly before he invaded Kuwait, Saddam shipped 100 new Mercedes cars 200 Series cars to top editors in Egypt and Jordan. Two days before the first attacks, Saddam reportedly offered Egypt's Hosni Mubarak $50 million in cash, "ostensibly for grain."

George H. W. Bush responded cautiously for the first several days. On one hand, Kuwait, prior to this point, had been a virulent enemy of Israel and was the Persian Gulf monarchy that had the most friendly relations with the Soviets. On the other hand, Washington foreign policymakers, along with Middle East experts, military critics, and firms heavily invested in the region, were extremely concerned with stability in this region. The invasion immediately triggered fears that the world's price of oil, and therefore control of the world economy, was at stake. The United Kingdom profited heavily from billions of dollars of Kuwaiti investments and bank deposits. Bush was perhaps swayed while meeting with British prime minister Margaret Thatcher, who happened to be in the U.S. at the time.

Yasser Arafat supported Saddam during the war. During the period of negotiations and threats following the invasion, Saddam focused renewed attention on the Palestinian problem by promising to withdraw his forces from Kuwait if Israel would relinquish its occupation over Palestine and the Syrian Golan Heights. Saddam's proposal further split the Arab world, pitting US- and Western-supported Arab states against the Palestinians. The allies ultimately rejected any linkage between the Kuwait crisis and Palestinian issues.

==== Operation Desert Storm ====
Cooperation between the United States and the Soviet Union made possible the passage of resolutions in the United Nations Security Council giving Iraq a deadline to leave Kuwait and approving the use of force if Saddam did not comply with the timetable. The United States officials feared that the Iraqi retaliation against oil-rich Saudi Arabia, since the 1940s a close ally of Washington, for the Saudis' opposition to the invasion of Kuwait. Accordingly, the United States and a group of allies, including countries as diverse as Egypt, Syria and Czechoslovakia, deployed a massive number of troops along the Saudi border with Kuwait and Iraq in order to encircle the Iraqi army, which was the largest in the Middle East.

Saddam's officers looted Kuwait, stripping even the marble from its palaces to move it to Saddam's own palace. Saddam ignored the Security Council deadline. Backed by the Security Council, a U.S-led coalition launched round-the-clock missile and aerial attacks on Iraq, beginning 16 January 1991. Israel, though subjected to attacks by Iraqi missiles, refrained from retaliating in order not to provoke Arab states into leaving the coalition. A ground force consisting largely of U.S. and British armored and infantry divisions ejected Saddam's army from Kuwait in February 1991 and occupied the southern portion of Iraq as far as the Euphrates.

On 6 March 1991, Bush announced "What is at stake is more than one small country, it is a big idea—a new world order, where diverse nations are drawn together in common cause to achieve the universal aspirations of mankind: peace and security, freedom, and the rule of law." In the end, the Iraqi army proved unable to compete on the battlefield with the highly mobile coalition land forces and their overpowering air support. Some 175,000 Iraqis were taken prisoner and casualties were estimated at over 85,000. As part of the cease-fire agreement, Iraq agreed to scrap all poison gas and germ weapons and allow UN observers to inspect the sites. UN trade sanctions would remain in effect until Iraq complied with all terms. Saddam publicly claimed victory at the end of the war.

=== Later years: 1990s to 2003 ===
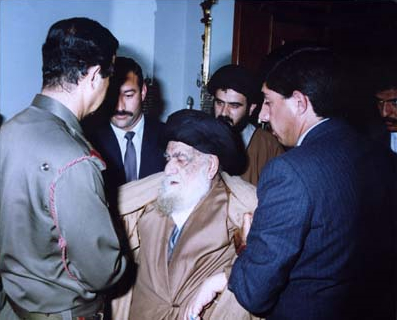
Saddam meeting Ayatollah Abu al-Qasim Khoei after the failure of the rebellions, 1991

Iraq's ethnic and religious divisions, together with the brutality of the conflict that this had engendered, laid the groundwork for postwar rebellions. In the aftermath of the fighting, social and ethnic unrest among Shia Muslims, Kurds, and dissident military units threatened the stability of Saddam's government. Uprisings erupted in the north, south and central parts of Iraq, but were ruthlessly repressed. The uprisings led to the death of 100,000–180,000 people, mostly civilians. The U.S., which had urged Iraqi people to rise up against Saddam, did nothing to assist the rebellions. Despite the widespread Shia rebellions, Iran had no interest in provoking another war, while Turkey opposed any prospect of Kurdish independence, and Saudi Arabia and other conservative Arab states feared an Iran-style Shia revolution. Saddam, having survived the immediate crisis in the wake of defeat, was left firmly in control of Iraq, although the country never recovered either economically or militarily from the Gulf War, until a modest recovery recorded in the early 2000s.

Saddam routinely cited his survival as "proof" that Iraq had in fact won the war against the U.S. This message earned Saddam a great deal of popularity in many sectors of the Arab world. John Esposito wrote, "Arabs and Muslims were pulled in two directions. That they rallied not so much to Saddam Hussein as to the bipolar nature of the confrontation (the West versus the Arab Muslim world) and the issues that Saddam proclaimed: Arab unity, self-sufficiency, and social justice." As a result, Saddam appealed to many people for the same reasons that attracted more and more followers to Islamic revivalism and also for the same reasons that fueled anti-Western feelings.

To gain support from religious communities, Saddam initiated the Faith Campaign in 1993, which was under the supervision of vice president Izzat Ibrahim al-Douri. Some elements of Sharia law were introduced, and the phrase "Allahu Akbar" ("God is great"), in Saddam's handwriting, was added to the national flag. Saddam also commissioned the production of a "Blood Quran", written using 27 litres of his own blood, to thank God for saving him from various dangers and conspiracies. Under the campaign, numerous mosques and Islamic institutes were built across Iraq. The United Nations-placed sanctions against Iraq for invading Kuwait were not lifted, blocking Iraqi oil exports. Economic hardship followed within the country as GDP plummeted from US$44.36 billion in 1990 to US$9 billion by 1995. Sanctions also restricted basic-medical equipment and supplies from getting into Iraq. Studies dispute the number of people who died in south and central Iraq during the years of the sanctions. On 9 December 1996, Saddam's government accepted the Oil-for-Food Programme that the UN had first offered in 1992.

Relations with the U.S. remained tense following the war. The U.S. launched a missile attack aimed at Iraq's intelligence headquarters in Baghdad on 26 June 1993, citing evidence of repeated violations of the "no fly zones" imposed after the war and for incursions into Kuwait. American officials continued to accuse Saddam of violating the terms of the Gulf War's ceasefire, by developing weapons of mass destruction and other banned weaponry, and violating the UN-imposed sanctions. Bill Clinton maintained sanctions and ordered air strikes in the "Iraqi no-fly zones", in the hope that Saddam would be overthrown by political enemies inside Iraq. Western charges of Iraqi resistance to U.N access to suspected weapons were the pretext for crises between 1997 and 1998, culminating in intensive U.S. and British missile strikes on Iraq, 16–19 December 1998. After two years of intermittent activity, U.S. and British warplanes struck harder at sites near Baghdad in February 2001. Former CIA case officer Robert Baer reports that he "tried to assassinate" Saddam in 1995, amid "a decade-long effort to encourage a military coup in Iraq." By the end of the 1990s, diplomatic isolation of Iraq with Arab states was gradually dissipating, and the economy of Iraq had improved by 2000, with its GDP increasing to $23.73 billion. Saddam later decided to use euros, instead of U.S. dollars for Iraqi oil. Almost all of Iraq's oil exports under the Oil-for-food program were paid in euros since 2001. Approximately 26 billion euros (£17.4bn) was paid for 3.3 billion barrels of oil into an escrow account in New York.

==== Arab–Israeli conflict ====
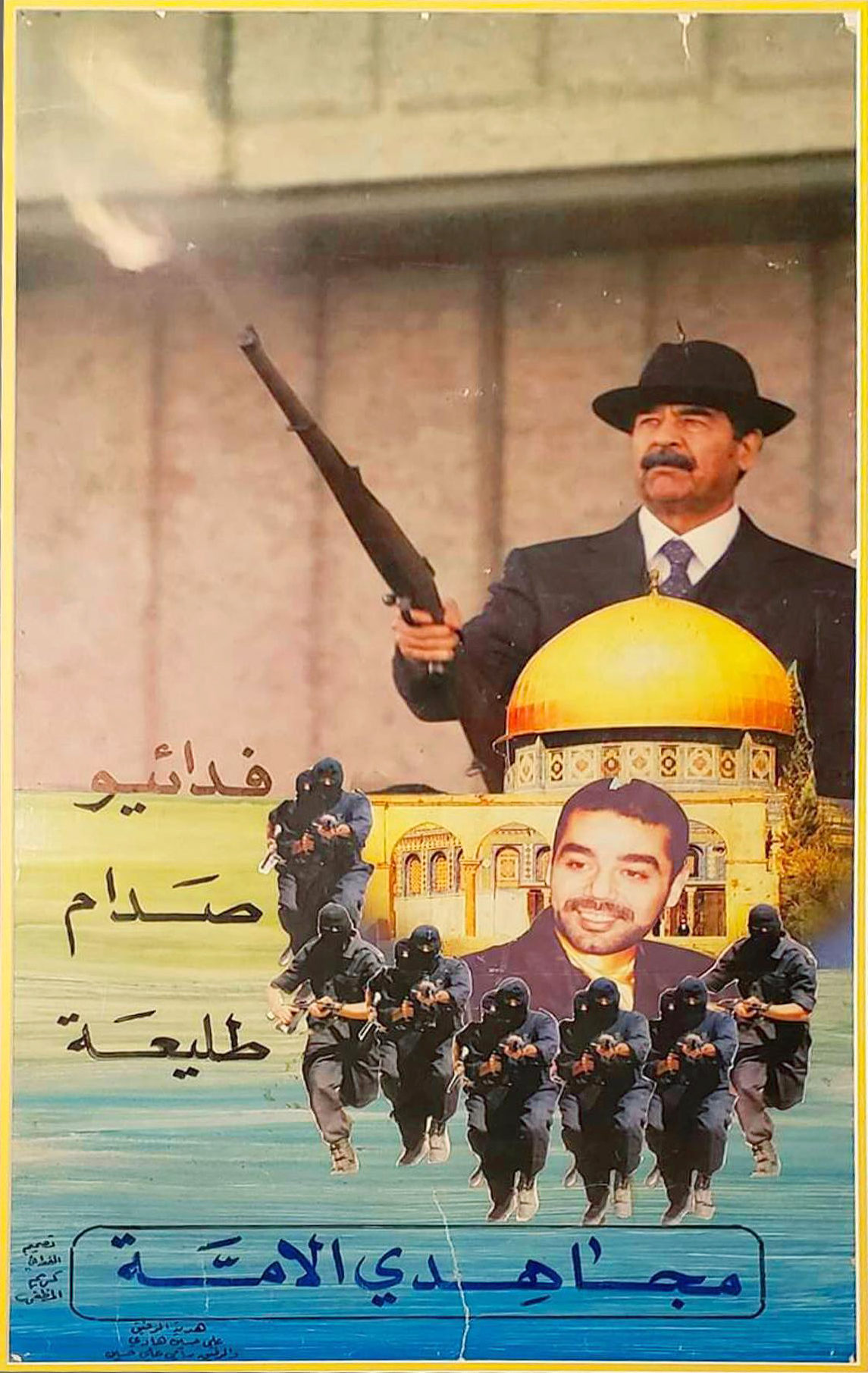
Propaganda poster for the recruitment of the Fedayeen Saddam

Saddam was known for his anti-Israel stance and had threatened to burn and destroy Israel.

Relations with Egypt and Iraq were stable before the 1980s, with both countries, Jordan and North Yemen founding the Arab Cooperation Council. Then president of Egypt, Hosni Mubarak, then refused military support for Iraq and condemned the invasion of Kuwait.

During the Iran–Iraq War, Israel was one of the main suppliers of military and intelligence support to Iran. In 1981, it carried out Operation Opera, a surprise attack on Iraq's unfinished Osirak nuclear reactor, with Iranian intelligence support. Amid the 1991 Gulf War, Iraq initiated a missile campaign against Israel.

Saddam supported several Palestinian guerrilla movements. He provided financial support to Palestinians. Iraq hosted numerous Palestinians as refugees and were given full rights as an Iraqi citizen, unlike the situation of Palestinians in other countries. Saddam had support of Yasser Arafat and had close relations with other Palestinian political leaders such as Muhammad Hassan Abd al-Rahman Melhem, and invited many to Iraq. According to reports by The Observer, Saddam held secret negotiations with the Israel government. In May 2000, Saddam and his representatives had secret meetings with the Israeli government. He offered that Iraq will end its anti–Israel foreign policy, if Israel will resolve Palestinian refugees issue in Lebanon. However, later this was denied by the government.

Following the outbreak of the Second Intifada in the Palestinian territories, Saddam openly expressed solidarity with the Palestinians, and established the Jerusalem Army, a volunteer force in solidarity with the Palestinians. Saddam also provided financial assistance from Iraq's oil revenue, to the families of the Palestinian victims and militants. Around 20% of Iraq's oil revenue, by the oil-for-food program was for donating to the Palestinians. Contrary to the claims of the United States and the Israelis, not all the money was sent to support suicide bombing. On the eve of Christmas in 2000, Saddam wrote a public letter, calling for Muslims and Christians of Iraq, to lead jihad against the Zionist movement. In 2001, Saddam declared on the state Iraqi television:

Palestine is Arab and must be liberated from the river to the sea and all the Zionists who emigrated to the land of Palestine must leave.

— Saddam Hussein

In 2002, following Israeli incursions into Palestinian territory, Saddam stopped supplying oil to Western countries in order to force Israel to abandon its incursions, a move supported by Iran and Libya.

== 2003 invasion and war ==
=== Background ===
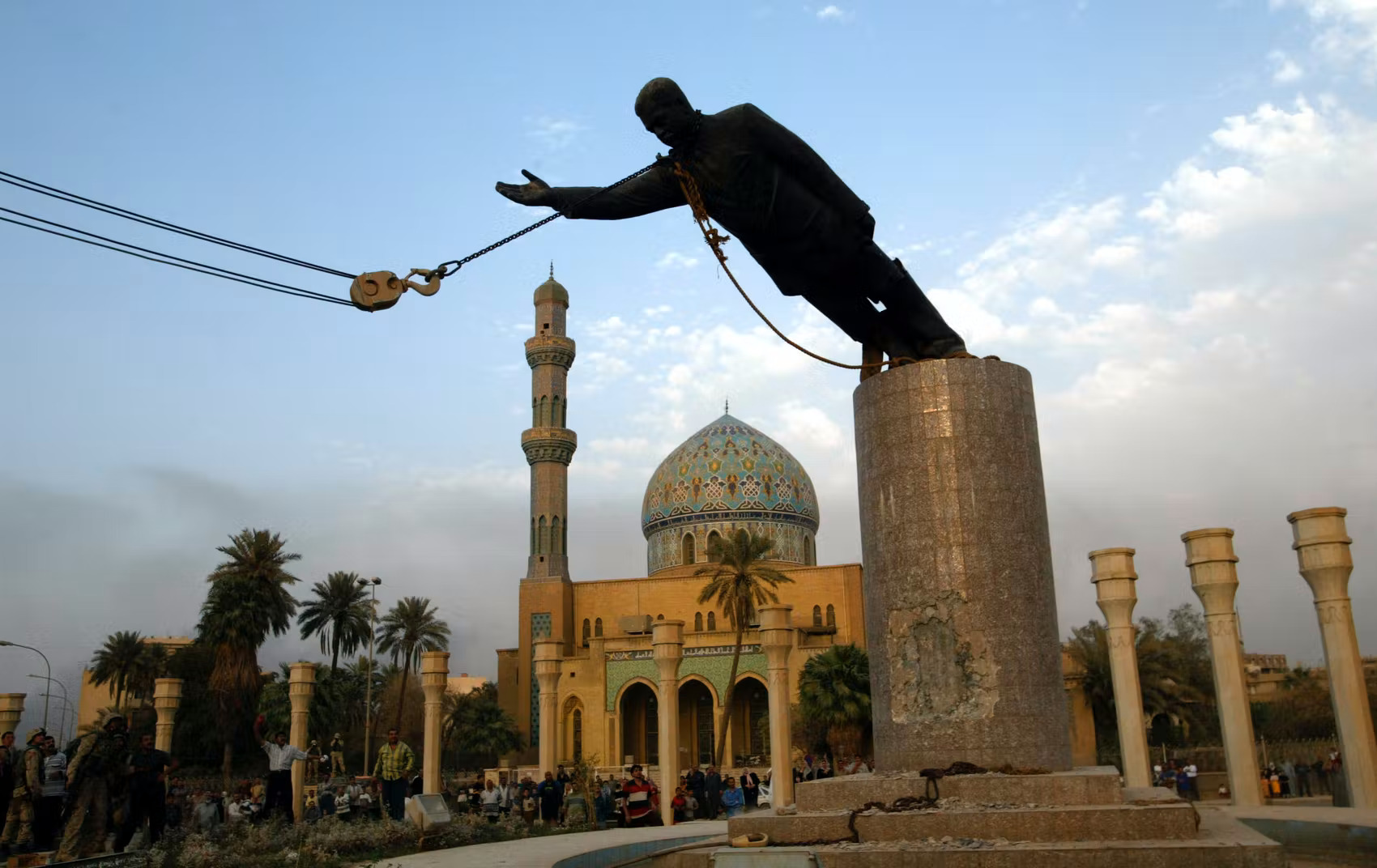
Statue of Saddam being toppled in Firdos Square after the invasion

Many members of the international community, especially the U.S., continued to view Saddam as a bellicose tyrant who was a threat to the stability of the region. In his January 2002 state of the union address to Congress, President George W. Bush spoke of an "axis of evil" consisting of Iran, North Korea, and Iraq. Moreover, Bush announced that he would possibly take action to topple the Iraqi government, because of the threat of its weapons of mass destruction. Bush stated that "The Iraqi regime has plotted to develop anthrax, and nerve gas, and nuclear weapons for over a decade ... Iraq continues to flaunt its hostility toward America and to support terror."

After the passing of UN Security Council Resolution 1441, which demanded that Iraq give "immediate, unconditional and active cooperation" with UN and IAEA inspections, Saddam allowed U.N. weapons inspectors led by Hans Blix to return to Iraq. During the renewed inspections beginning in November 2002, Blix found no stockpiles of WMD and noted the "proactive" but not always "immediate" Iraqi cooperation as called for by Resolution 1441.

With war still looming on 24 February 2003, Saddam took part in an interview with CBS News reporter Dan Rather. Talking for more than three hours, he denied possessing any weapons of mass destruction, or any other weapons prohibited by the UN guidelines. He also expressed a wish to have a live televised debate with George W. Bush, which was declined. It was his first interview with an American reporter in over a decade. CBS aired the taped interview later that week. Saddam later told an FBI interviewer that he once left open the possibility that Iraq possessed weapons of mass destruction in order to appear strong against Iran.

=== Invasion and overthrow ===
The United States-led coalition forces initiated the invasion of Iraq on 20 March 2003. The Iraqi government and military collapsed within three weeks of the beginning of the invasion. By the beginning of April, the coalition forces occupied much of Iraq. The resistance of the much-weakened Iraqi Armed Forces either crumbled or shifted to guerrilla tactics, and it appeared that Saddam had lost control of Iraq. He was last seen in a video which purported to show him in the Baghdad suburbs surrounded by supporters. When Baghdad fell to US-led forces on 9 April, marked symbolically by the toppling of his statue, Saddam was nowhere to be found and his government was completely overthrown.

=== Capture and interrogation ===
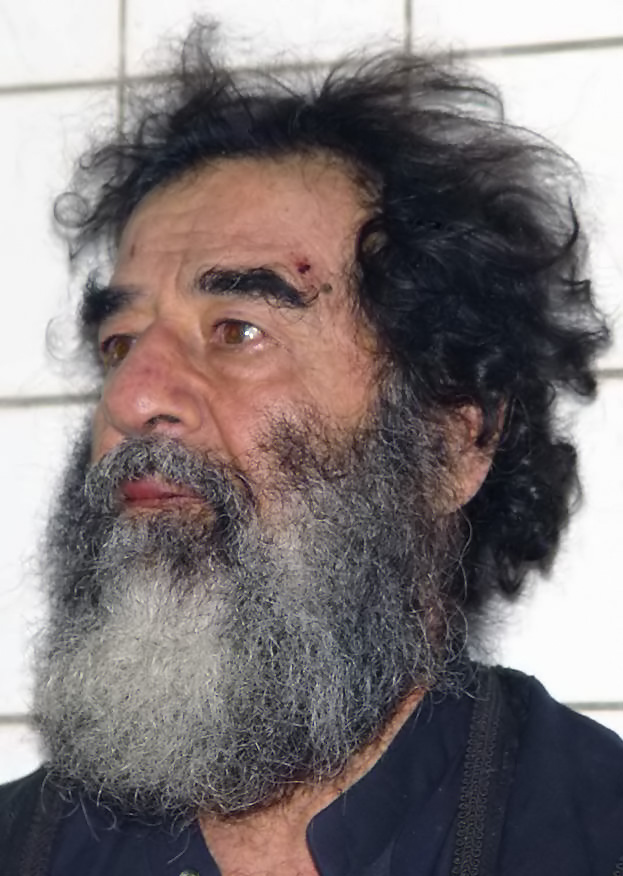
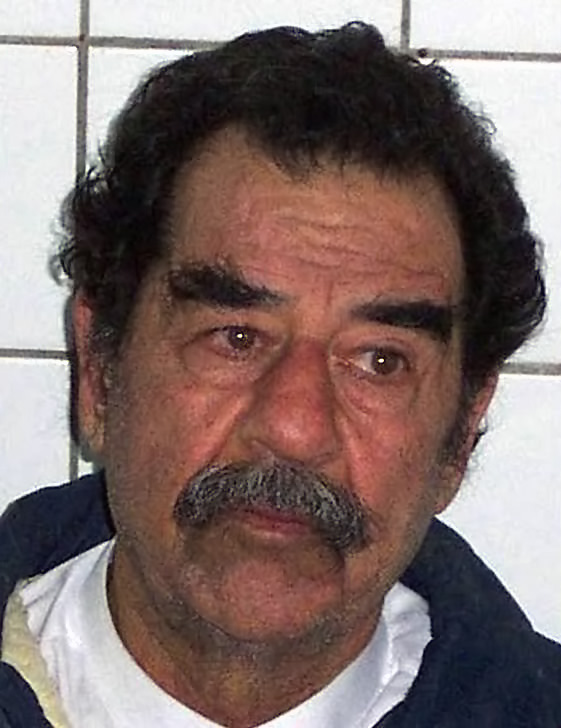
Saddam shortly after capture (left), and after being shaved to confirm his identity (right)

In April 2003, Saddam's whereabouts remained in question during the weeks following the fall of Baghdad and the conclusion of the major fighting of the war. Various sightings of Saddam were reported in the weeks following the war, but none were authenticated. At various times he released audio tapes promoting popular resistance to his ousting. On 22 July 2003, his sons Uday and Qusay and 14-year-old grandson Mustafa were killed in a three-hour gunfight with the U.S. forces in Mosul. Upon their deaths, he commemorated them as "martyrs" on radio. Saddam was placed at the top of the US list of most-wanted Iraqis, which included officials of his government and the party members.

On 13 December 2003, in Operation Red Dawn, Saddam was captured by American forces after being found hiding in a hole in the ground near a farmhouse in Ad-Dawr, near Tikrit. Following his capture, Saddam was transported to a US base near Tikrit, and later taken to the American base near Baghdad Airport. Documents obtained and released by the National Security Archive detail FBI interviews and conversations with Saddam while he was in US custody. On 14 December, US administrator in Iraq Paul Bremer confirmed that Saddam had indeed been captured at a farmhouse in ad-Dawr near Tikrit. Bremer presented video footage of Saddam in custody. He was shown with a full beard and hair longer than his familiar appearance. He was described by US officials as being in good health. Bremer reported plans to put Saddam on trial, but claimed that the details of such a trial had not yet been determined. Iraqis and Americans who spoke with Saddam after his capture generally reported that he remained self-assured, describing himself as a "firm, but just leader."

Saddam's fingerprints, obtained by the National Security Archive

British tabloid newspaper The Sun posted a picture of Saddam wearing white briefs on the front cover of a newspaper. Other photographs inside the paper show Saddam washing his trousers, shuffling, and sleeping. The U.S. government stated that it considered the release of the pictures a violation of the Geneva Convention and that it would investigate the photographs. During this period Saddam was interrogated by FBI agent George Piro.

The guards at the Baghdad detention facility called their prisoner "Vic", which stands for "Very Important Criminal" and let him plant a small garden near his cell. The nickname and the garden are among the details about the former Iraqi leader that emerged during a March 2008 tour of the Baghdad prison and cell where Saddam slept, bathed, kept a journal, and wrote poetry in the final days before his execution; he was concerned to ensure his legacy and how the history would be told. The tour was conducted by US Marine Maj. Gen. Doug Stone, overseer of detention operations for the US military in Iraq at the time. During his imprisonment he exercised and was allowed to have his personal garden; he also smoked his cigars and wrote his diary in the courtyard of his cell.

=== Trial ===
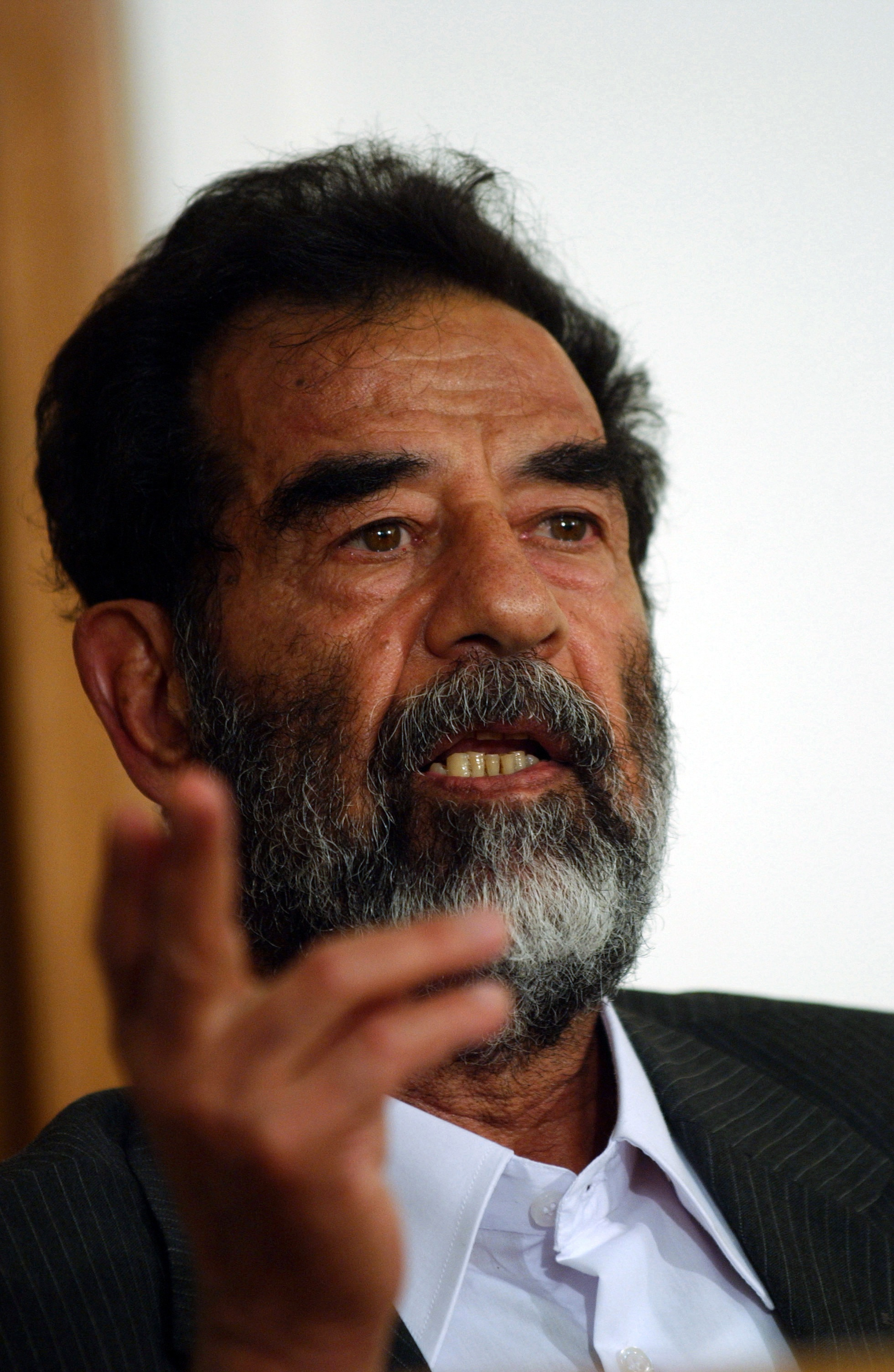
Saddam speaking in court during his trial

On 30 June 2004, Saddam, held in custody by US forces at the US base "Camp Cropper", along with 11 other senior Ba'athist leaders, was handed over to the interim Iraqi government to stand trial for crimes against humanity and other offences.

A few weeks later, he was charged by the Iraqi Special Tribunal with crimes committed against residents of Dujail in 1982, following a failed assassination attempt against him. Specific charges included the murder of 148 people, torture of women and children and the illegal arrest of 399 others. Numerous challenges came during his trial. Saddam and his lawyers contested the court's authority and maintained that he was still the President of Iraq. There were assassinations and attempted assassinations of several of Saddam's lawyers. The replacement of the chief presiding judge midway through the trial had impact on the trial.

On 5 November 2006, Saddam was found guilty of crimes against humanity — the killing of 148 Shia residents in the town of Dujail in 1982 — and was sentenced to death by hanging. His half-brother, Barzan Ibrahim, and Awad Hamed al-Bandar, head of Iraq's Revolutionary Court in 1982, were convicted of similar charges and were themselves sentenced to death. The verdict and sentencing were both appealed, but subsequently affirmed by Iraq's Supreme Court of Appeals.

=== Execution ===
Saddam was executed by hanging on the first day of Eid ul-Adha, 30 December 2006, despite his request to be executed by firing squad, which he argued was the most appropriate method due to his role as commander-in-chief of the Iraqi military. The execution was carried out at Camp Justice, an Iraqi army base in Baghdad's Kadhimiya neighborhood.

Saudi Arabia condemned the Iraqi authorities for carrying out the execution on a holy day. A presenter from the Al-Ikhbariya television station officially stated: "There is a feeling of surprise and disapproval that the verdict has been applied during the holy months and the first days of Eid al-Adha. Leaders of Islamic countries should show respect for this blessed occasion ... not demean it."

An unofficial video of the execution was recorded on a mobile phone and his captors could be heard insulting Saddam. The execution video was leaked and widely circulated online within hours, sparking global controversy. It was later claimed by the head guard at the tomb where his remains lay that Saddam's body had been stabbed six times after the execution. Saddam's demeanor while being led to the gallows has been discussed by two witnesses, Iraqi Judge Munir Haddad and Iraqi national security adviser Mowaffak al-Rubaie. The accounts of the two witnesses are contradictory as Haddad describes Saddam as being strong in his final moments whereas al-Rubaie says Saddam was clearly afraid, but the common view is not of the latter. Not long before the execution, Saddam's lawyers released his last letter.

Saddam spoke his last words during the execution, "May God's blessings be upon Muhammad and his household. And may God hasten their appearance and curse their enemies." Then one of the crowd repeatedly said the name of the Iraqi Shia cleric Muqtada al-Sadr. Saddam laughed and later said, "Do you consider this manhood?" The crowd shouted, "go to Hell." Saddam replied, "To the hell that is Iraq!?" Again, one of the crowd asked those who shouted to keep quiet for God. Saddam started recitation of final Muslim prayers, "I bear witness that there is no god but Allah and I testify that Muhammad is the Messenger of Allah." One of the crowd shouted, "The tyrant has collapsed!" Saddam said, "May God's blessings be upon Muhammad and his household". He recited the shahada one and a half times, as while he was about to say 'Muhammad' on the second shahada, the trapdoor opened, cutting him off mid-sentence. The rope broke his neck, killing him instantly. A second unofficial video, apparently showing Saddam's body on a trolley, emerged several days later. It sparked speculation that the execution was carried out incorrectly as Saddam had a gaping hole in his neck.

Saddam was buried at his birthplace of Al-Awja in Tikrit, Iraq, on 31 December 2006. He was buried 3 km (2 mi) from his sons Uday and Qusay Hussein. His tomb was reported to have been destroyed in March 2015. Before it was destroyed, a Sunni tribal group reportedly removed his body to a secret location, fearful of what might happen.

== Personal life and family ==
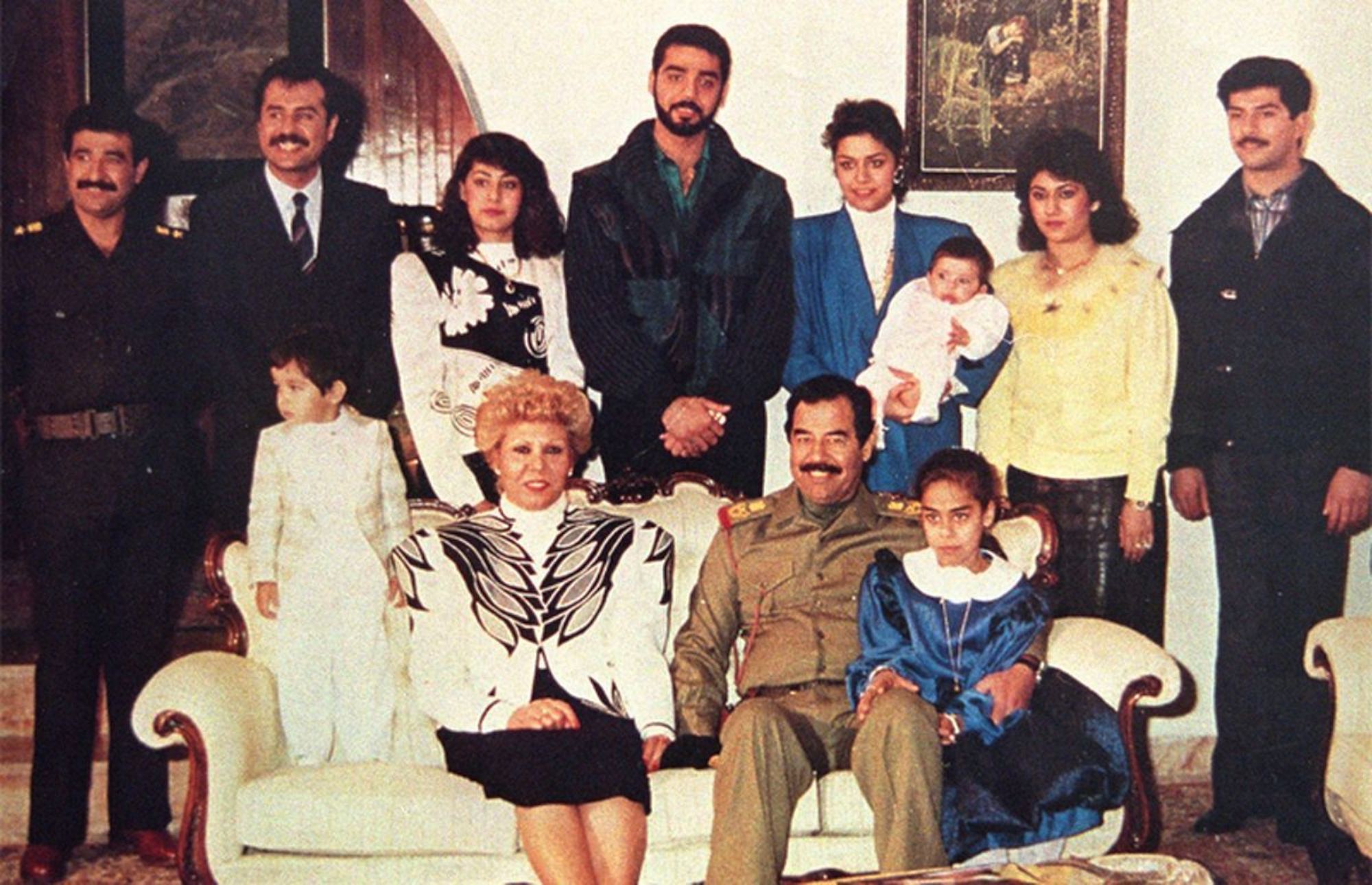
Saddam Hussein's family, mid-late 1980s

- Saddam married his first wife and cousin Sajida Talfah in 1963. They became engaged in Egypt during his exile, and married in Iraq after Saddam's 1963 return. The couple had five children.
  - Uday Hussein (1964–2003), who was Saddam's oldest son, who ran the Iraqi Football Association, the Saddam loyalist militia Fedayeen Saddam, and several media corporations in Iraq including Iraqi TV and the newspaper Babel. Uday, while originally Saddam's favorite son and likely successor, eventually fell out of favor with his father due to his erratic and violent behavior. He was briefly married to Izzat Ibrahim ad-Douri's daughter, but later divorced her. The couple had no children.
  - Qusay Hussein (1966–2003), who was Saddam's second son. Qusay was believed to have been Saddam's later intended successor, as he was less erratic than his older brother and kept a low profile. He was second in command of the military (behind his father) and ran the elite Iraqi Republican Guard and the SSO. He was married once and had three children.
  - Raghad Hussein (1968), who is Saddam's oldest daughter. After the 2003 invasion of Iraq, Raghad fled to Amman, Jordan where she received sanctuary from the royal family. She is currently wanted by the Iraqi government for allegedly financing and supporting the insurgency of the now banned Iraqi Ba'ath Party. The Jordanian royal family refused to hand her over. She was married to Hussein Kamel al-Majid and has had five children from this marriage.
  - Rana Hussein (1969), who is Saddam's second daughter. She, like her sister, fled to Jordan and has stood up for her father's rights. She was married to Saddam Kamel and has had four children from this marriage.
  - Hala Hussein (1972), who is Saddam's third and youngest daughter. Very little information is known about her. Her father arranged for her to marry General Jamal Mustafa Abdallah Sultan al-Tikriti in 1998. She fled with her children and sisters to Jordan. In June 2021, an Iraqi court ordered the release of her husband after 18 years in prison.
- Saddam met his second wife, Samira Shahbandar, in 1979 and married her in 1986. She was originally the wife of an Iraqi Airways executive, but later became the mistress of Saddam. Eventually, Saddam forced Samira's husband to divorce her so he could marry her. After the war, Samira fled to Beirut, Lebanon.
  - Ali Saddam Hussein (c. 1981), who is believed to be Saddam's youngest child. He is listed on United States' Treasury sanctions list. Not very much is known about him other than the fact that his mother is Samira Shahbandar. His existence was repeatedly denied by Saddam's family.

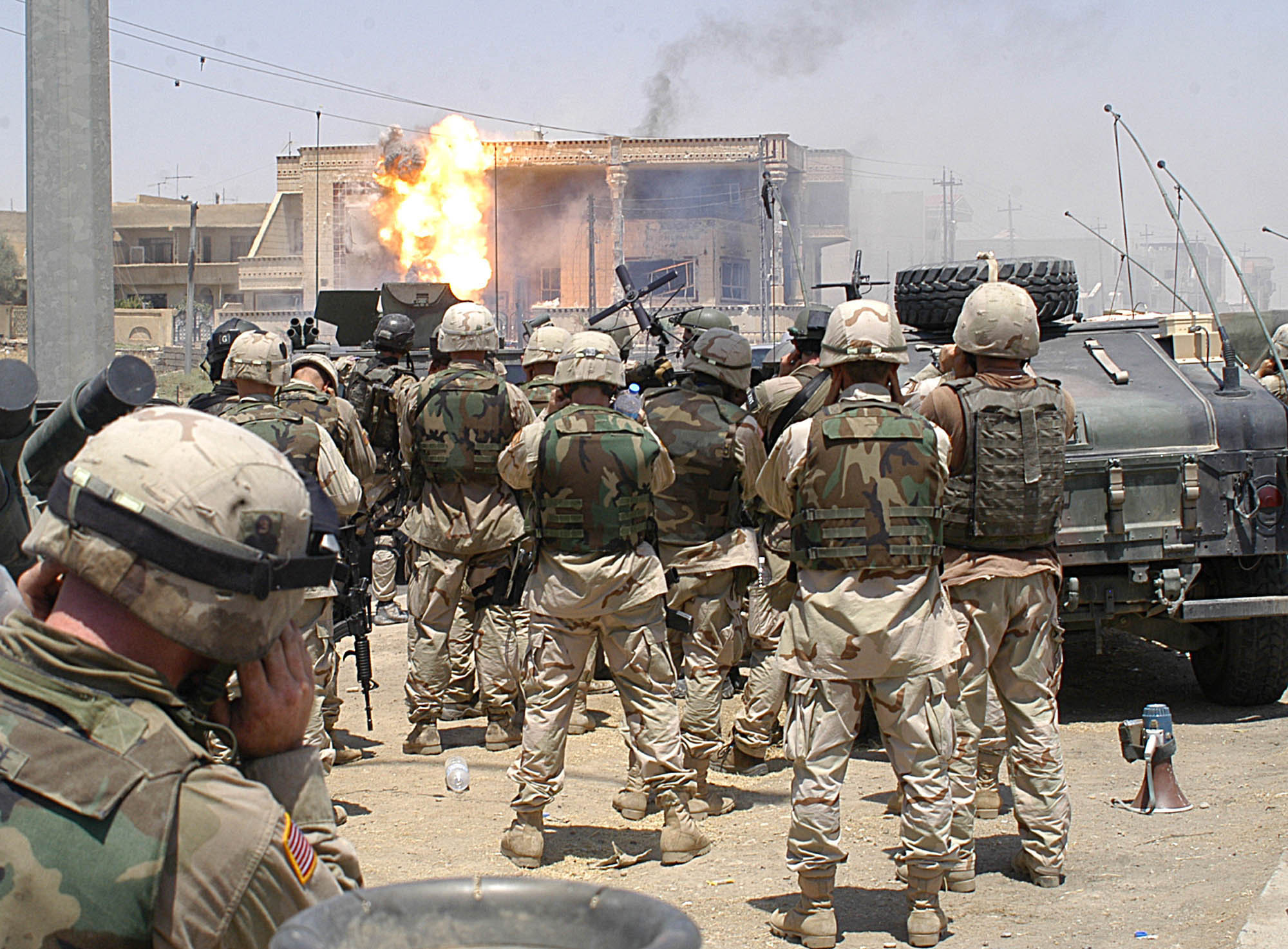
Saddam Hussein's sons Qusay and Uday were killed in a gun battle in Mosul on 22 July 2003.

- Saddam had allegedly married a third wife, Nidal al-Hamdani, the general manager of the Solar Energy Research Center in the Council of Scientific Research.
- Wafa Mullah Huwaysh is rumored to have married Saddam as his fourth wife in 2002. There is no firm evidence for this marriage. Wafa is the daughter of Abd al-Tawab Mullah Huwaysh, a former minister of military industry in Iraq and Saddam's last deputy Prime Minister.

In August 1995, Raghad and her husband, Hussein Kamel al-Majid, and Rana and her husband, Saddam Kamel al-Majid, defected to Jordan with their children. They returned to Iraq after receiving assurances that Saddam would pardon them. Within three days of their return in February 1996, the Kamel brothers were killed in a gunfight with clan members who considered them traitors.

In August 2003, Saddam's daughters Raghad and Rana were granted sanctuary in Jordan. That month, they spoke with CNN and the Arab satellite station Al-Arabiya in Amman. When asked about her father, Raghad told CNN, "He was a very good father, loving, has a big heart." Asked if she wanted to give a message to her father, she said: "I love you and I miss you." Her sister Rana also remarked, "He had so many feelings and he was very tender with all of us."

Saddam was known for his lavish tastes, including wearing a diamond-coated Rolex wristwatch, which he reportedly gifted to political allies and friends.

On 28 April 2001, Saddam marked his 64th birthday with a large state-sponsored celebration.

== Honors and awards ==
In 1991, the Iraqi government awarded Saddam the Order of the Two Rivers, the country's highest honor, as a recognition of his "historic role" and "noble services to Iraq". This announcement was made following a Cabinet meeting, and Information Minister Hamid Youssef Hummadi stated that the decision was unanimous. The award was bestowed on Saddam, during his 54th birthday, in appreciation of his exceptional contributions and significant impact on Iraq.

During his presidency he was often referred to by his kunya "Abu Uday" (Father of Uday). Many of his supporters still refer to him as such to this day.

He was honored by titles such as "Field Marshal" and "Comrade". Saddam Hussein is one of the recipients of the Key to the City. In 1980, Saddam received a ceremonial key to the city of Detroit after making a donation of nearly half a million dollars to a local Chaldean-Catholic church. Saddam successfully turned Iraq into a leading hub for healthcare and education. This improved the quality of life in Iraq. For this reason, Saddam was honored by an award from UNESCO.

A collection of medals attributed to Saddam was once displayed in a museum in Johannesburg, South Africa. He received the Order of Merit (Wisam al-Jadara), which is rare and was awarded to only a few Iraqi rulers. Order of the Mother of Battles was awarded to Saddam Hussein for his role in the 1991 Gulf War against Kuwait and the United States. He received numerous medals from the Iraqi state commemorating his involvement or leadership during various events.

== Political and cultural image ==
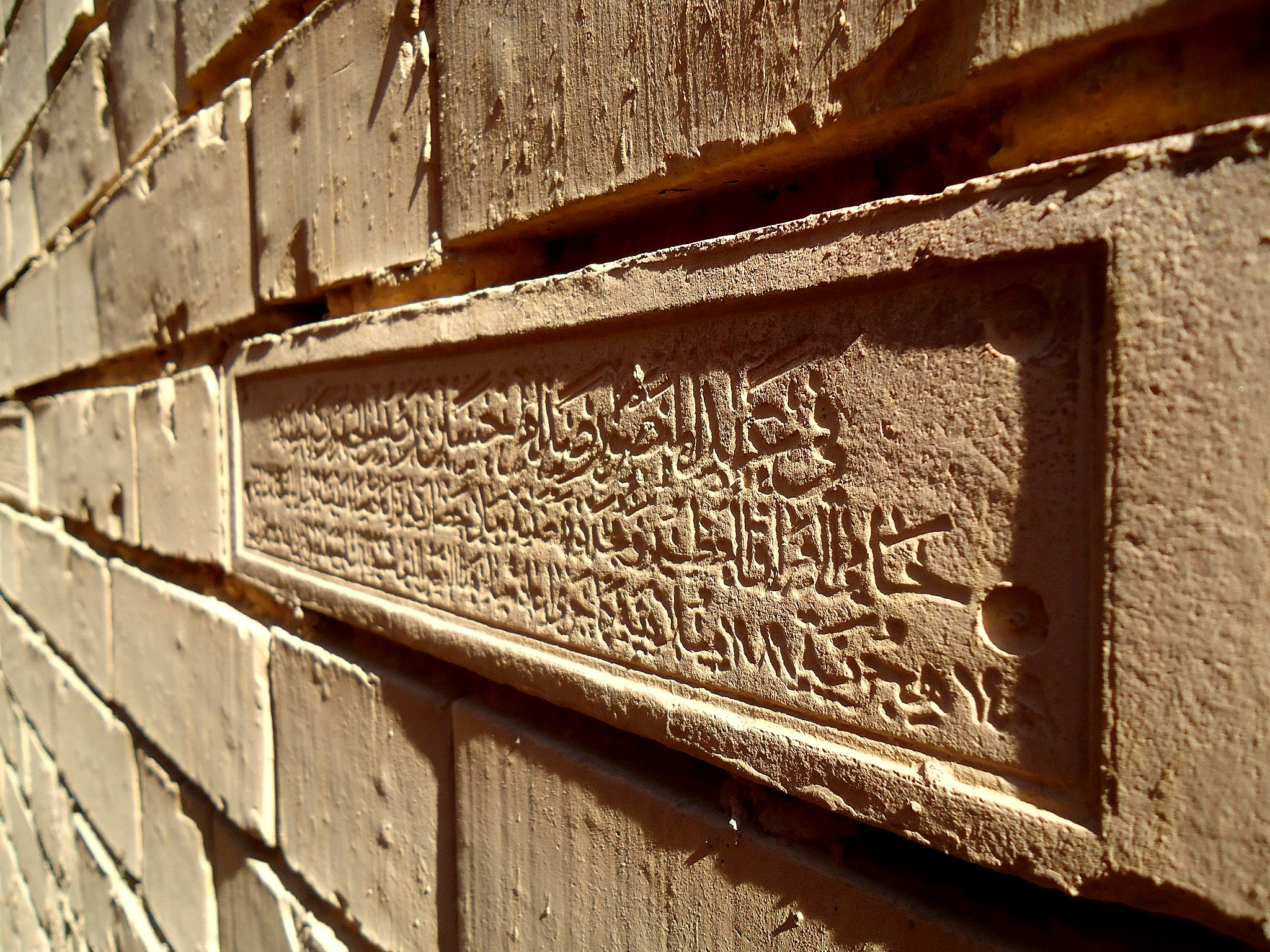
Stamped brick at the ancient city of Babylon bearing the name of Saddam Hussein

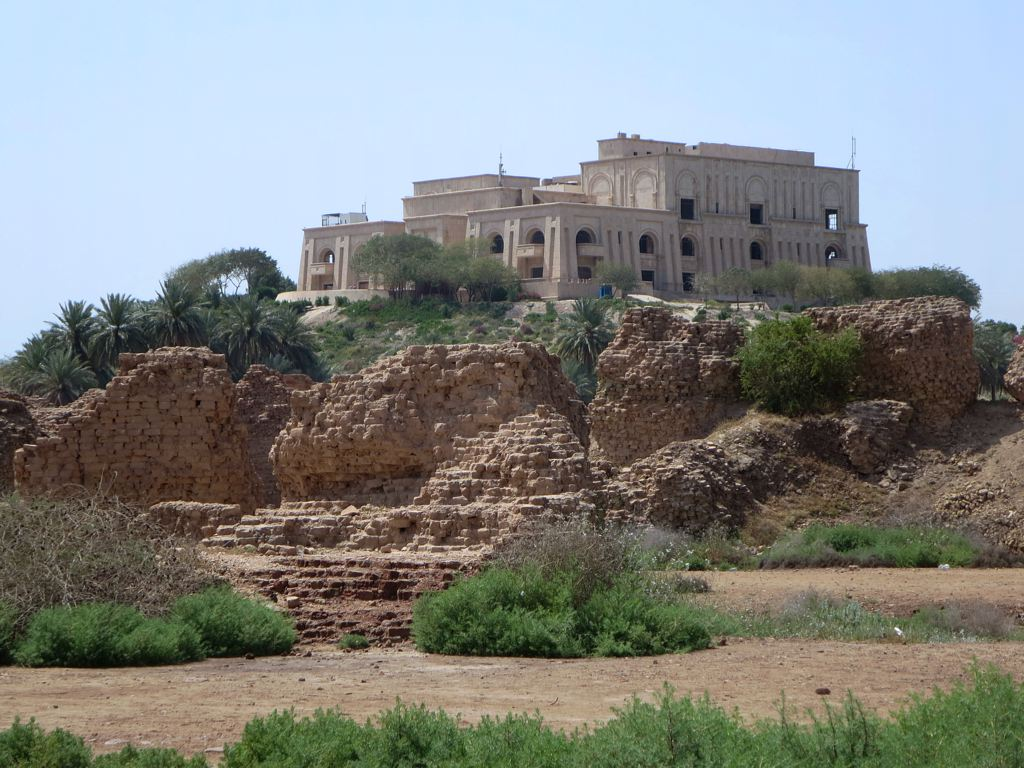
Saddam's palace near the ruins of the North Palace of Nebuchadnezzar II at Babylon

The political ideas and policies pursued by Saddam became known as Saddamism. This doctrine was officially endorsed by his government and promoted by the Iraqi daily newspaper Babel owned by his son Uday Hussein.

During his leadership, Saddam promoted the idea of dual nationalism that combined Iraqi nationalism and Arab nationalism, linking Iraq's identity to wider matters that impact Arabs as a whole. Saddam viewed Iraq's ancient Mesopotamian heritage as compatible with his vision of Arab nationalism. In the course of his reign, the government adopted the historic Muslim leader Saladin as a national symbol, while Saddam styled himself as the modern successor of Babylonian King Nebuchadnezzar and had stamped the bricks of ancient Babylon with his name and titles next to him. During the Gulf War, Saddam claimed the historic roles of Nebuchadnezzar, Saladin, and Gamal Abdel Nasser.

Saddam often emphasized his nomadic Bedouin roots, framing them as a source of honor and traditional values. Following the death of Ayatollah Khomeini, his long-time adversary, Saddam instructed media outlets not to gloat, stating that it was part of Arab cultural tradition to show restraint in speaking about the dead and that "when he is dead, that's it. You don't talk ill of the dead."

He organized two show elections in 1995 and 2002. In the 1995 referendum, he reportedly received 99.96% of the votes with 99.47% turnout, gaining 3,052 negative votes among an electorate of 8.4 million. In the 2002 referendum, he officially achieved 100% of approval votes and 100% turnout, as the electoral commission reported the next day that every one of the 11,445,638 eligible voters cast a "Yes" vote for the president.

== Reception and legacy ==
Throughout the Arab world, many Arabs praise Saddam as a resolute leader who stood up to Western imperialism, Israeli occupation of Palestine, and foreign intervention in the region, while some Iraqis, especially Shias and Kurds, may view him negatively as a dictator responsible for brutal authoritarianism, repression and injustices.

Supporters noted that under Saddam, the government invested heavily in infrastructure projects, such as roads, bridges, and public buildings. The government invested in building schools and hospitals, and literacy rates in Iraq increased significantly during his rule. Women were encouraged to participate in education and the workforce, and many held high-ranking positions in government and public institutions. Saddam's regime was secular in character. Religion did not play a dominant role in the government's policies. Saddam's regime later placed greater emphasis on Islam in all sectors of Iraqi life from 1993 through the Faith Campaign. In 1977, Saddam stated "our Party does not take a neutral stance between faith and atheism; it is always on the side of faith."

By contrast, critics described Saddam as a repressive totalitarian leader, with international media and observers frequently referring to him by the epithet the "Butcher of Baghdad" in light of his regime's documented atrocities. His regime's repressive tactics included widespread surveillance, torture, and extrajudicial killings. Numerous cases of human rights abuses committed by his government were documented by human rights organizations. Saddam's regime suppressed political opposition through a combination of violence, intimidation, and censorship. Freedom of speech and freedom of the press were severely curtailed, and political opponents were often executed or imprisoned. He initiated three military conflicts, including the Iran–Iraq War, the Iraqi invasion of Kuwait, and the Gulf War. These actions led to heavy casualties and widespread regional instability. While there were economic development initiatives, Saddam's regime was also marked by mismanagement and widespread corruption, particularly during the final years of his regime. The economic sanctions imposed on Iraq during his rule further exacerbated hardships for the country's population. Saddamism has been described by critics as a mix of "Sunni Arab nationalism, confused Stalinism, and fascist zeal for the fatherland and its leader".

In July 2016, then US presidential candidate Donald Trump praised Saddam for militant suppression and stability during his presidency in Iraq. Libyan politician and commander of the Libyan National Arab Army, Khalifa Haftar, named his son Saddam Haftar after Saddam Hussein.

Cultural depictions of Saddam can be found in various movies, including three documentary movies made about Saddam. Saddam's Tribe, released in 2007, explores the complex relationship between Saddam Hussein and the Al-Bu Nasir, a powerful Arab tribe in Iraq to which Saddam belongs. In 2008, a TV series based on his life — House of Saddam — was released. In 2024, it was announced that Irish actor Barry Keoghan would appear in a new movie about Saddam's final days.

== See also ==
- List of heads of state and government deposed by foreign powers in the 20th and 21st century
- List of heads of state and government who were later imprisoned
- List of heads of state and government who were sentenced to death
- Modern history of Iraq – History of Iraq since World War I
- Most-wanted Iraqi playing cards – US wartime propaganda campaign
- Saddam Hussein's novels – List of novels authored by Saddam Hussein
- US list of most-wanted Iraqis

== Notes ==
Political offices
Preceded by Ahmed Hassan al-Bakr	President of Iraq; 1979–2003	Succeeded by Jay Garner as Director of the Office for Reconstruction and Humanitarian Assistance of Iraq
Preceded by Ahmed Hassan al-Bakr	Prime Minister of Iraq; 1979–1991	Succeeded by Sa'dun Hammadi
Preceded by Ahmad Husayn Khudayir as-Samarrai	Prime Minister of Iraq; 1994–2003	Succeeded by Mohammad Bahr al-Ulloum as Acting President of the Governing Council of Iraq
Party political offices
Preceded by Ahmed Hassan al-Bakr	Leader of the Ba'ath Party; 1979–2006	Succeeded by Izzat Ibrahim ad-Douri
