= Saddam (name) =

- Pronunciation: Arabic: [sˤadˈdaːm] [sˤɑdˈdæːm] (Colloquial); Hindi: [sədˈdaːm]
- Gender: Male
- Language: Arabic

Origin
- Meaning: He who confronts, Adamant
- Region of origin: Arabia

Other names
- Alternative spelling: Sadam, Saddem

Saddam (Arabic: صدام, Ṣaddām) is an Arabic title that means "one who confronts". Other meanings include: "one who frequently causes collisions", "powerful collider", and "powerful confronter." The name has risen in popularity in some Sunni populations after the Iraq War and Saddam Hussein's execution.

== People ==
- Saddam Hussein (1937–2006), 5th President of Iraq
- Saddam Hussain (Chhatra League), Bangladeshi student leader, activist, and fugitive convicted in multiple criminal cases
- Saddam Hussain (athlete) (born 1991), Pakistani runner
- Saddam Hussain (footballer) (born 1993), Pakistani footballer
- Saddam Hosein, Trinidad and Tobago politician
- Saddam Hossain (cricketer) (born 1995), Bangladeshi cricketer
- Saddam Haftar (born 1991), Libyan politician
- Saddam Kamel (1956–1996), former head of the Iraqi Republican Guard, relative of Saddam Hussein
- Saddam Kietyongyuth (born 1983), Thai boxer
- Saddam al-Jamal (born 1987), Islamic militant
- Saddam Abdel-Muhsan (born 1991), Jordanian footballer
- Saddam Afridi, Pakistani cricketer
- Sadam Ali (born 1988), Yemeni-American boxer
- Sadam Koumi (born 1994), Sudanese sprinter
- Sadam Sulley (born 1996), Ghanaian footballer
- Sadam Mangal (born 1998), Afghan cricketer
- Saddem Hmissi (born 1991), Tunisian volleyball player
