= Habbush letter =

Political scandal

The Habbush letter, or Habbush memo (Arabic: رسالة حبوش, romanized: risāla Ḥabbūši), is a handwritten message dated July 1, 2001, which appears to show a link between al-Qaeda and Iraq's government. It purports to be a direct communication between the head of Iraqi Intelligence, General Tahir Jalil Habbush al-Tikriti, to Iraqi president Saddam Hussein, outlining mission training which Mohamed Atta, one of the organizers of the September 11 attacks, supposedly received in Iraq. The letter also claims that Hussein accepted a shipment from Niger, an apparent reference to an alleged uranium acquisition attempt that U.S. President George W. Bush cited in his January 2003 State of the Union address.

The authenticity of the letter has been disputed since it was first made public in December 2003. In 2008, journalist Ron Suskind claimed that it was a forgery created by the Central Intelligence Agency (CIA), under the direction of the White House. Two of Suskind's sources denied having knowledge of anyone in their chain of command ordering the forging of the letter. John Conyers, Chairman of the United States House Committee on the Judiciary, released a report into the allegations in 2009, in which he concluded that "the Administration figures who ordered and authored the apparent forgery ... remain unidentified".

== Background ==
On December 13, 2003, the day of Saddam Hussein's capture by US forces, the website of The Daily Telegraph of London published a story which ran on the front page of the following day's Sunday Telegraph. The story not only claimed Saddam Hussein had trained one of the hijackers in the September 11 attacks, but also that his government, assisted by a "small team from the Al Qaeda organization", was expecting to receive a suspicious consignment from the country of Niger. The article, and a second piece, were both written by Con Coughlin, executive foreign editor to the paper.

Coughlin's information came from a secret intelligence memorandum, purportedly handwritten during Saddam Hussein's final days in power and discovered later by the newly formed Iraqi Interim Government, which summarized an operational relationship between Mohamed Atta, a known associate of al-Qaeda and one of the hijackers in the September 11 attacks, and the Iraqi Intelligence Service (IIS). The letter was signed by General Tahir Jalil Habbush al-Tikriti, chief of IIS, and directed to the President of Iraq. Coughlin said that he had received this document from a "senior member of the Iraqi interim government", though this person "declined to reveal where and how they obtained it."

== Content ==
Habbush's July 1, 2001, letter is labeled "Intelligence Items" and is addressed: "To the President of the Ba'ath Revolution Party and President of the Republic, may God protect you." It continues:

Mohammed Atta, an Egyptian national, came with Abu Ammer [the real name behind this Arabic alias remains a mystery] and we hosted him in Abu Nidal's house at al-Dora under our direct supervision. We arranged a work program for him for three days with a team dedicated to working with him ... He displayed extraordinary effort and showed a firm commitment to lead the team which will be responsible for attacking the targets that we have agreed to destroy.

== Initial reaction to the letter ==
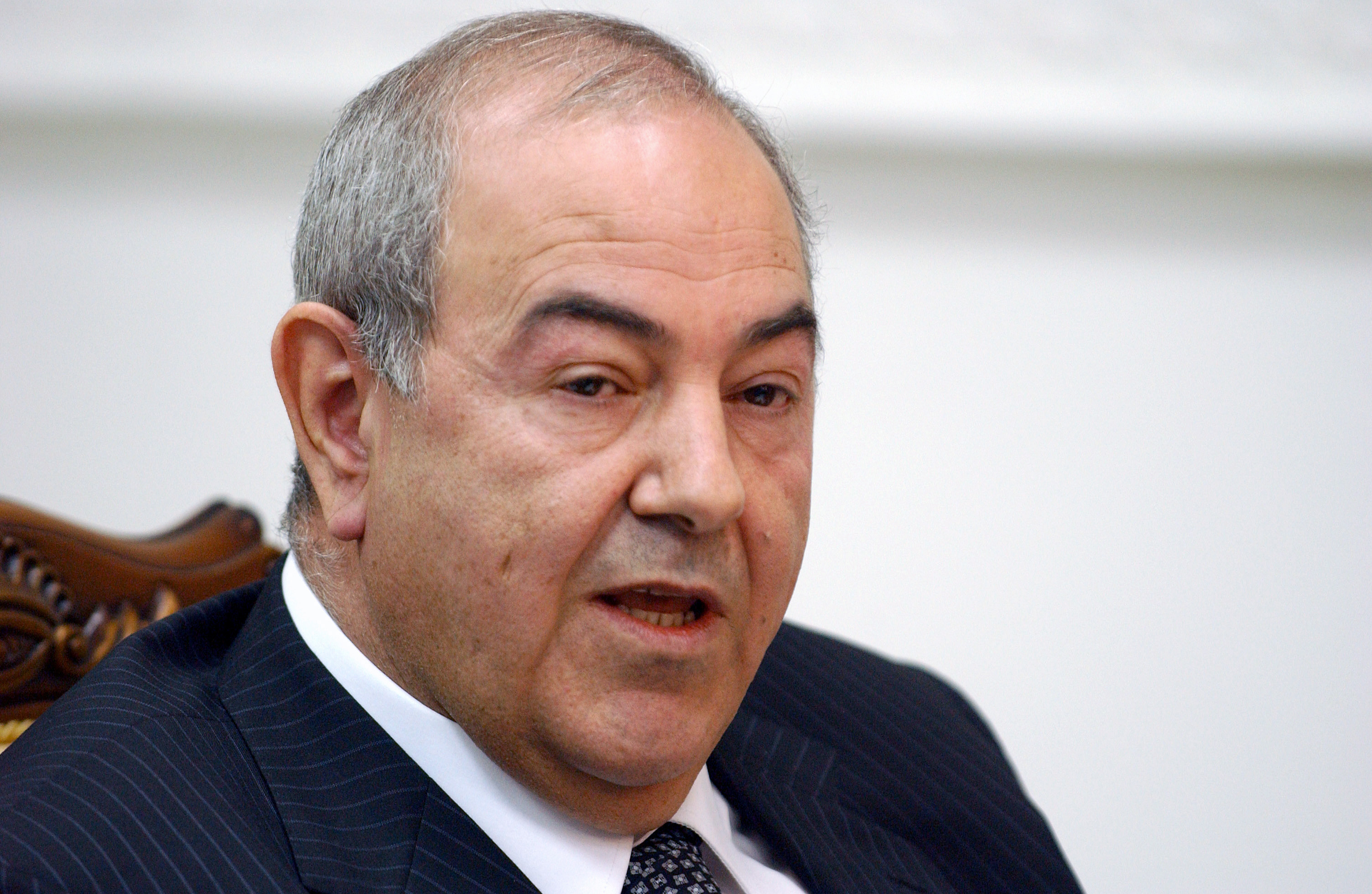
Ayad Allawi

Ayad Allawi, interim Prime Minister of Iraq, was quoted in the original report, offering personal assurance over the document's authenticity: "We are uncovering evidence all the time of Saddam's involvement with al-Qaeda. ... But this is the most compelling piece of evidence that we have found so far. It shows that not only did Saddam have contacts with al-Qaeda, he had contact with those responsible for the September 11 attacks."

The story was quickly picked up and repeated by several conservative columnists in the US, including syndicated columnist Deroy Murdock and William Safire. Safire talked about the document in an op-ed for the New York Times, claiming Saddam had attempted to cover-up his links to 9/11 by assassinating Abu Nidal, who the letter claims was with Mohammed Atta in Iraq.

Three weeks later, in an interview with the Rocky Mountain News, Vice President Dick Cheney spoke more broadly on Saddam Hussein and al-Qaeda link allegations:

We haven't really had the time yet to pore through all those records in Baghdad. We'll find ample evidence confirming the link, that is the connection if you will between al Qaida and the Iraqi intelligence services. They have worked together on a number of occasions.

=== Doubts ===
On December 17, 2003, a Newsweek article titled "Terror Watch: Dubious Link Between Atta And Saddam", by Michael Isikoff and Mark Hosenball, outlined some of the main reasons to doubt the authenticity of the letter:

... the FBI has compiled a highly detailed time line for Atta's movements throughout the spring and summer of 2001 based on a mountain of documentary evidence, including airline records, ATM withdrawals and hotel receipts. Those records show Atta crisscrossing the United States during this period—making only one overseas trip, an 11-day visit to Spain that didn't begin until six days after the date of the Iraqi memo ... ... Ironically, even the Iraqi National Congress of Ahmed Chalabi, which has been vocal in claiming ties between Al Qaeda and Saddam's regime, was dismissive of the new Telegraph story. "The memo is clearly nonsense", an INC spokesman told Newsweek.

The article also quoted an Iraq document expert named Hassan Mneimneh, as well as unnamed US officials, who claim that the document was probably part of "a thriving new trade in dubious Iraqi documents".

== Ron Suskind's allegation ==
Ron Suskind, in his 2008 book The Way of the World, claimed that the Habbush letter had been forged by the White House, with the co-operation of senior CIA officials, including Robert Richer, the Associate Deputy Director of Operations. The letter was intended to be used as evidence of a link between al-Qaeda and Saddam Hussein, thereby further justifying the invasion of Iraq.

The idea was to take the letter to Habbush and have him transcribe it in his own neat handwriting on a piece of Iraq government stationery, to make it look legitimate. CIA would then take the finished product to Baghdad and have someone release it to the media.

Suskind goes on to describe what he believes happened next: Richer spoke to John Maguire, a CIA Iraq expert, who said that this plan would not work, as Habbush would not sign anything himself because the insurgency would harm his family. This, by Suskind's account, led to the White House telling the CIA to hand-write the letter itself. Suskind's book says that this new order was eventually passed down to the Iraq Operations Group, who carried it out. Maguire left for Baghdad to help run the CIA station there and was not involved directly in the mission, other than discussing the mission with Richer.

Suskind also contends that Habbush, who still carries a $1 million reward for his capture, was secretly resettled in Jordan by the CIA with $5 million in US taxpayers' money.

Suskind claimed to have held tape-recorded interviews with Richer, Maguire, and Nigel Inkster of the British Secret Intelligence Service, in which they apparently testified that the White House was behind the forging of the letter. According to a partial transcript of one of Suskind's interviews with Richer, published on Suskind's website, Richer saw a letter on White House stationery that had been passed down the ranks of the CIA – through George Tenet, then-CIA director, then to James Pavitt, the deputy director of Operations, then to Pavitt's chief of staff, who passed it on to Richer. The letter, which Richer said might or might not have come from the vice president's office, described a plan to create a forged document and release it "as essentially a representation of something Habbush says".

On August 5, 2008, the White House issued a statement on behalf of George Tenet, Robert Richer and John Maguire, addressing Suskind's allegation. Tenet said:

It is well established that, at my direction, CIA resisted efforts on the part of some in the Administration to paint a picture of Iraqi – Al-Qaida connections that went beyond the evidence. The notion that I would suddenly reverse our stance and have created and planted false evidence that was contrary to our own beliefs is ridiculous.

The CIA issued its own statement on August 22, 2008, saying that Suskind's allegations regarding Habbush "did not happen", and Tenet followed the same day with a second statement saying that Suskind's charges were "demonstrably false in every regard." Nigel Inkster told the Guardian that "Mr Suskind's characterisation of our meeting is more the stuff of creative fiction than serious reportage".

== Subsequent reactions ==
In The American Conservative on August 7, 2008, Philip Giraldi stated that "extremely reliable and well placed source in the intelligence community" told him that Suskind's basic story about the White House ordering the forgery was correct but that some of his details were not. According to Giraldi, his source cleared CIA officials George Tenet, Robert Richer, and John Maguire of involvement, but stated that Dick Cheney ordered the forgery using the Office of Special Plans run by Douglas Feith.

Author Joe Conason noted that Ayad Allawi had visited CIA headquarters in Langley just days before speaking with Con Coughlin of the Telegraph. Coughlin, in a blog post highly critical of Suskind, confirmed that he had indeed received the letter from Ayad Allawi. He also called the letter a "leak" and said he got it in November 2003, in Baghdad.

John Conyers, Chairman of the United States House Committee on the Judiciary, released a statement on August 11, 2008, indicating that he had instructed his staff to review a number of Suskind's allegations. On August 20, he wrote to six current and former officials with the Bush administration—Tenet, Richer, Maguire, Lewis Libby, A. B. Krongard, and John Hannah—requesting that they contact his committee staff regarding the allegations. A month later, his inquiry was reported to have made little progress. In January 2009, Conyers released his report entitled Reining in the Imperial Presidency that he described as "detailing the abuses and excesses of the Bush administration and recommending steps to address them." He reiterated Suskind's allegation and stated that he received no information from the officials that confirmed any knowledge of the fabrication. Conyers concluded that "the Administration figures who ordered and authored the apparent forgery ... remain unidentified".

== See also ==
- Iraq War
- Iraq War misappropriations
- Mohamed Atta's alleged Prague connection
- Niger uranium forgeries
