= Law enforcement in Iraq =

The Iraqi police system was re-established following the overthrow of Saddam Hussein in 2003.

== Up to 2003 ==
The Jihaz Al-Mukhabarat Al-A'ma (Mukhabarat) was a secret police organization during the administration of Saddam Hussein.

== Since 2003 ==
=== Iraqi Police Service ===
After the previous police force was completely disbanded, in 2003 a new Iraqi Police Service was established to act as a municipal law enforcement agency under the authority of the Ministry of Interior. At this time the International Police was deployed to Iraq. This is a functional organization made up of police officers from all over the world, serving mostly under the direction of the United Nations, to help train, recruit, and field police forces in war torn countries. The force is usually deployed into a war torn country initially acting as the police, and bringing order. In the process, they recruit and train a local police force, which eventually takes on the responsibilities of enforcing the law and maintaining order, whereas the International Police then take on a supporting role.

Plans call for a highway patrol element to be added in the future. The Police Service does not conduct investigative operations, but it has been assigned to support some operations of coalition military forces. In early 2005, a nominal total of 55,000 police officers had been trained, but the training and reliability of this force were under question. The target number for the force has been variously estimated at 65,000 and 89,000. In 2004 starting pay for police personnel was US$60 per month, with a hazardous duty allowance of an additional US$87 per month. Experts consider reform of the police system a long and difficult process. As under the Hussein administration, police corruption, extortion, and theft have continued to be a problem. In the January 2005 elections, the National Guard and police provided polling place security that monitors characterized as adequate, under threats of large-scale insurgent disruption.

=== Intelligence agencies ===
The Iraqi National Intelligence Service (INIS) was established in 2004 in cooperation with the U.S. Central Intelligence Agency (CIA) to gather information on groups threatening national security. The president is to appoint the director of the INIS, which is to serve as an information agency for the Council of Ministers and have no law enforcement authority. Another intelligence agency, Mudiriyat al-Amn al-Amma, was also formed in 2004.

== See also ==
- Asayesh, the Kurdish police
- List of the size of police force by country
