= General Security Directorate (Iraq) =

Coordinates: 33.33°N 44.48°E

- Mudiriyat al-Amn al-Amma مديرية الامن العامة

Agency overview
- Formed: January 2004
- Preceding agencies: al-Amn al-‘Amm (internal, secret police); Mukhabarat (external)
- Superseding agency: Iraqi National security Service
- Jurisdiction: Government of Iraq
- Headquarters: Baghdad, Iraq
- Employees: 500–2,000
- Agency executive: Zuheir Fadel Abbas al-Ghirbawi
- Parent agency: Independent

The General Security Directorate (GSD) (مديرية الامن العامة, Mudiriyat al-Amn al-Amma) was the intelligence agency of Iraq. Although details on its organisation were not made clear at the time, the General Security Directorate's designated mission was to "infiltrate and annihilate Iraq's tenacious insurgency".

The GSD was eventually replaced by the Iraqi National Intelligence Service.

== History ==
After the 2003 U.S. invasion of Iraq, L. Paul Bremer disbanded Saddam Hussein's military and security services, including the Mukhabarat. As the security situation within Iraq deteriorated and Iraqi resistance to the occupation became stronger and more violent, the need for a secret service became more pressing. In December 2003, The Washington Post reported, Iyad Allawi and Nouri Badran, two members of the Interim Governing Council and Iraqi National Accord officials, flew to the US to discuss details of setting up a new secret service with the help of the CIA. The agency was to be headed by Badran and recruit many agents of Saddam's Mukhabarat. The main objective of the new organisation was to counter the insurgency.

In January 2004, The New York Times reported that the creation of the new agency was under way. It was to employ between 500 and 2,000 staff and be financed by the U.S. government. Ibrahim al-Janabi was said to be the main candidate for leading the spy agency. These efforts drew criticism from Ahmed Chalabi, another formerly exiled Iraqi politician who had good connections with the CIA, who voiced worries that the new agency might be used for the restoration of the old Ba'athist security apparatus and follow the well-established pattern of government repression.

In March 2004, L. Paul Bremer announced the creation of the Iraqi National Intelligence Service, headed by Mohammed Abdullah Mohammed al-Shahwani and replaced the GSD. The INIS is funded from secret funds set aside within the Iraq appropriation approved by the US Congress. These secret funds, totalling $3 billion over three years, are said to be destined for covert CIA operations within Iraq (as well as, to a small extent, Afghanistan).

In June 2004, it was reported that the GSD also included ex-Iraqi Intelligence Service agents. It was announced by interim Prime Minister Iyad Allawi at a press conference in July 2004 in a climate of widespread violence by terrorist groups and the Iraqi insurgency.
