= Mohamed Atta's alleged Prague connection =

Alleged meeting involving a September 11 hijacker

A claimed connection between Iraq and al-Qaeda came through an alleged meeting between September 11 ringleader Mohamed Atta and the Iraqi consulate in Prague, Czech Republic in April 2001. This alleged connection was a key claim used by the Bush administration to justify the 2003 U.S.–led invasion of Iraq. The Czech counterintelligence service claimed that Mohamed Atta el-Sayed, the ringleader of the September 11 attacks, met with Ahmad Samir al-Ani, the consul at the Iraqi Embassy at a café in Prague. This claim, sometimes known as the "Prague connection", is generally considered to be false and has been said to be unsubstantiated by the Senate Intelligence Committee in the United States.

== Allegations ==
In an interview with NBC's Meet the Press on December 9, 2001, then-Vice President Dick Cheney said:

It's been pretty well confirmed that (Atta) did go to Prague, and he did meet with a senior official of the Iraqi intelligence service in (the Czech Republic) last April, several months before the attack.

Cheney repeated the allegation as the nation prepared for war with Iraq.

The source for the claim came from a contact the Czech intelligence had within the Iraqi embassy, described in The Boston Globe as "a single informant from Prague's Arab community who saw Atta's picture in the news after the 11 September attacks, and who later told his handlers that he had seen him meeting with Ani. Some officials have called the source unreliable."

The story was first leaked to the Reuters news service on September 18, 2001. Without naming Prague, Reuters reported that "recent intelligence information received by the United States showed Atta had met with a representative of Iraqi intelligence this year". The report cited "U.S. government sources". On October 13, 2001, the story was leaked to Czech newspapers. The story was confirmed by the State Department. On October 20, 2001, The New York Times published a story by John Tagliabue saying Czech officials denied the meeting ever occurred.

On October 26, Czech Republic Interior Minister Stanislav Gross responded by calling a press conference at which he "confirmed" that Atta "did make contact with an officer of the Iraqi intelligence" in Prague, namely al-Ani, who was later expelled from the country.

On October 27, The New York Times published a story refuting its earlier story. Later The New York Times reported that Czech officials later backed off of the claim, first privately, and then later publicly after the paper conducted "extensive interviews with leading Czech figures."

When rumors of the Czech officials privately backing away from the claims first appeared in the Western media, according to The Prague Post, Hynek Kmoníček, the Czech envoy to the UN stated, "The meeting took place." One senior Czech official who requested anonymity speculated that the media reports dismissing the meeting were the result of a "guided leak." On 15 March 2002 David Ignatius wrote in The Washington Post:

Even the Czechs, who initially put out the reports about Atta's meeting with al-Ani, have gradually backed away. The Czech interior minister, Stanislav Gross, said in October that the two had met in April 2001. That version was altered slightly by Czech Prime Minister Miloš Zeman when he told CNN in November [2001]: 'Atta contacted some Iraqi agent, not to prepare the terrorist attack on [the twin towers] but to prepare [a] terrorist attack on just the building of Radio Free Europe' in Prague. Then, in December, Czech President Václav Havel retreated further, saying there was only 'a 70 percent' chance Atta met with al-Ani.

But Havel later "moved to quash the report once and for all" by making the statement publicly to the White House, as reported in The New York Times. According to the Times report, "Czech officials also say they have no hard evidence that Mr. Ani was involved in terrorist activities, although the government did order his ouster in late April 2001." The New York Times report was described as "a fabrication" by a Ladislav Špaček, a spokesman for Czech president Václav Havel. But Špaček also "said Mr. Havel was still certain there was no factual basis behind the report that Mr. Atta met an Iraqi diplomat." The Times story was a potential embarrassment to Czech prime minister Miloš Zeman after "extensive interviews with Czech and other Western intelligence officials, politicians and people close to the Czech intelligence community revealed that Mr. Zeman had prematurely disclosed an unverified report."

== Investigations ==
Several official organizations conducted investigations into the possibility that such a meeting occurred, and they all concluded that the evidence did not support the likelihood of such a meeting.

=== CIA ===
Shortly after September 11, Vice President Dick Cheney asked Director of Central Intelligence George Tenet to look into the claim that Atta had met an Iraqi intelligence agent. Tenet put the Directorate of Operations Jim Pavitt on the case, who reported back to Tenet. On September 21, 2001, Tenet told the President, "Our Prague office is skeptical about the report. It just doesn't add up." Tenet also indicated that other evidence the CIA was able to find, including credit card and telephone records, made such a meeting highly unlikely.

According to columnist Robert Novak, Secretary of Defense Donald Rumsfeld "confirmed published reports that there is no evidence placing the presumed leader of the terrorist attacks in the Czech capital." According to the January 2003 CIA report Iraqi Support for Terrorism, "the most reliable reporting to date casts doubt on this possibility" that such a meeting occurred. Director of Central Intelligence George Tenet released "the most complete public assessment by the agency on the issue" in a statement to the Senate Armed Services Committee in July 2004, stating "Although we cannot rule it out, we are increasingly skeptical that such a meeting occurred."

John E. McLaughlin, who at the time was the Deputy Director of the CIA, described the extent of the Agency's investigation into the claim: "Well, on something like the Atta meeting in Prague, we went over that every which way from Sunday. We looked at it from every conceivable angle. We peeled open the source, examined the chain of acquisition. We looked at photographs. We looked at timetables. We looked at who was where and when. It is wrong to say that we didn't look at it. In fact, we looked at it with extraordinary care and intensity and fidelity."

=== FBI ===
A senior administration official told Walter Pincus of The Washington Post that the FBI had concluded that "there was no evidence Atta left or returned to the U.S. at the time he was supposed to be in Prague." FBI Director Robert S. Mueller III outlined the extent of their investigation into the hijacker's whereabouts in a speech in April 2002: "We ran down literally hundreds of thousands of leads and checked every record we could get our hands on, from flight reservations to car rentals to bank accounts." There are no known travel records showing Atta leaving or entering the US at that time, and everything known about Atta's whereabouts suggests that he was in Florida at that time.

=== Czech police and intelligence ===
The Czech police chief, Jiří Kolář, "said there were no documents showing that Atta visited Prague at any time" in 2001.

In August 2002, Czech foreign intelligence chief František Bublan publicly backed away from the claim that Atta met al-Ani, saying that rumors of such meetings "have not been verified or proven." The Prague Post reported that "Bublan said that promoting a so-called 'Prague connection' between Atta and al-Ani might have been a ploy by U.S. policymakers seeking justifications for a new military action against Iraqi leader Saddam Hussein."

According to an article in The Washington Post more recently, the Czechs backed away from the claim: "After months of further investigation, Czech officials determined last year that they could no longer confirm that a meeting took place, telling the Bush administration that al-Ani might have met with someone other than Atta." This perception seems confirmed by an associate of al-Ani's who suggested to a reporter that the Czech informant had mistaken another man for Atta. The associate said "I have sat with the two of them at least twice. The double is an Iraqi who has met with the consul. If someone saw a photo of Atta he might easily mistake the two."

In 2014, Jiří Růžek, the former head of Czech intelligence agency BIS, published his memoirs. Here he claims that the USA tried to push Czech prime minister Miloš Zeman to announce that 9/11 attack was planned with the help of Iraq in Prague. All blame for the false cause of conflict would then fall on Czech authorities.

=== 9/11 Commission ===
The 9/11 Commission also addressed the question of an alleged Prague connection and listed many of the reasons above that such a meeting could not have taken place. The report notes that "the FBI has gathered intelligence indicating that Atta was in Virginia Beach on April 4 (as evidenced by a bank surveillance camera photo), and in Coral Springs, Florida on April 11, where he and Shehhi leased an apartment. On April 6, 9, 10, and 11, Atta's cellular telephone was used numerous times to call various lodging establishments in Florida from cell sites within Florida. We cannot confirm that he placed those calls. But there are no U.S. records indicating that Atta departed the country during this period." Combining FBI and Czech intelligence investigations, "[n]o evidence has been found that Atta was in the Czech Republic in April 2001." The Commission assessed that "There was no reason for such a meeting, especially considering the risk it would pose to the operation. By April 2001, all four pilots had completed most of their training, and the muscle hijackers were about to begin entering the United States. The available evidence does not support the original Czech report of an Atta-Ani meeting."

In the final analysis, the 9/11 Commission Report makes this statement: "These findings cannot absolutely rule out the possibility that Atta was in Prague on April 9, 2001. He could have used an alias to travel and a passport under that alias, but this would be an exception to his practice of using his true name while traveling (as he did in January and would in July when he took his next overseas trip)." (p. 229)

== Two different Attas ==
Until late 2004, many believed that Atta traveled to Prague for one day on May 30, 2000. Nobody claimed he had met al-Ani at that time, but conservative columnist Andrew C. McCarthy wrote in the National Review that his trip was considered suspicious. Atta was apparently detained because he did not have a travel visa but was not picked up on airport surveillance.

However, the Chicago Tribune reported in August 2004 that it was a different Atta who traveled to Prague in May 2000 — a Pakistani businessman also named Mohamed Atta, who spells his name differently from the hijacker — and was turned away because he lacked a visa. The hijacker Mohamed Atta — whose travel papers were in order — went to the Prague airport a couple days later on his way to Newark, creating confusion for some:

On June 2, the hijacker Mohamed Atta, who had a visa, arrived in Prague by bus from Cologne, Germany, and flew to Newark the next day. Video surveillance cameras at a Prague bus terminal showed him playing slot machines at the station's Happy Days Casino before disappearing.

The confusion over the two different Attas "had serious consequences," according to Czech reporter Brian Kenety, "as it laid the groundwork for spurious claims by Czech authorities of a secret meeting in Prague between Atta the hijacker and an Iraqi intelligence agent."

The Chicago Tribune on 29 September 2004 also reported that a man from Pakistan named Mohamed Atta (spelling his name with two "m's" rather than one) flew to the Czech Republic in 2000, confusing the intelligence agency, who thought it was the same Mohamed Atta. In September 2004, Jiří Růžek, the former head of the BIS, told the Czech newspaper Mladá fronta Dnes, "This information was verified, and it was confirmed that it was a case of the same name. That is all that I recall of it." (3 September 2004).

Opposition leaders in the Czech Republic have publicly called this a failure on the part of Czech intelligence. In hopes of resolving the issue, Czech officials hoped to be given access to information from the U.S. investigation but that cooperation was not forthcoming. In May 2004, the Czech newspaper Právo speculated that the source of the information behind the rumored meeting was actually the discredited INC chief Ahmed Chalabi.

== Forged letter ==
According to Con Coughlin, executive foreign editor of The Daily Telegraph, Mohamed Atta is mentioned in a handwritten letter from the former chief of the Iraqi Intelligence Service, Gen. Tahir Jalil Habbush al-Tikriti, to Saddam Hussein. Coughlin said he received the document from a "senior member of the Iraqi interim government", though this person "declined to reveal where and how they obtained it."

Habbush's July 1, 2001, letter is labeled "Intelligence Items" and is addressed: "To the President of the Ba'ath Revolution Party and President of the Republic, may God protect you." It continues:

Mohamed Atta, an Egyptian national, came with Abu Ammer [the real name behind this Arabic alias remains a mystery] and we hosted him in Abu Nidal's house at al-Dora under our direct supervision.

We arranged a work program for him for three days with a team dedicated to working with him ... He displayed extraordinary effort and showed a firm commitment to lead the team which will be responsible for attacking the targets that we have agreed to destroy.

Coughlin quoted Ayad Allawi giving personal assurance over the document's authenticity: "We are uncovering evidence all the time of Saddam's involvement with al-Qaeda ... But this is the most compelling piece of evidence that we have found so far. It shows that not only did Saddam have contacts with al-Qaeda, he had contact with those responsible for the September 11 attacks."

The letter is now widely recognized as a forgery. Newsweek noted: "U.S. officials and a leading Iraqi document expert tell NEWSWEEK that the document is most likely a forgery—part of a thriving new trade in dubious Iraqi documents that has cropped up in the wake of the collapse of Saddam's regime." According to the newsmagazine, "The Telegraph story was apparently written with a political purpose: to bolster Bush administration claims of a connection between Al Qaeda and Saddam's regime."

In the 2008 book The Way of the World, author Ron Suskind claims that the Bush administration itself was behind the forgery.

== Additional evidence ==
Even further doubt was cast on rumors of such a meeting in December 2003 when Al-Ani, who is in U.S. custody, reportedly denied having ever met Atta. According to Newsweek, it was "a denial that officials tend to believe given that they have not unearthed a scintilla of evidence that Atta was even in Prague at the time of the alleged rendezvous."

Atta's own religious and political convictions made him violently opposed to the Saddam regime; according to the 9/11 Commission Report, "In his interactions with other students, Atta voiced virulently anti-Semitic and anti-American opinions, ranging from condemnations of what he described as a global Jewish movement centered in New York City that supposedly controlled the financial world and the media, to polemics against governments of the Arab world. To him, Saddam Hussein was an American stooge set up to give Washington an excuse to intervene in the Middle East."

== Cheney's position changes ==
Vice President Dick Cheney, who was a proponent of the theory that Atta had met al-Ani in Prague, acknowledged in an interview on March 29, 2006: "We had one report early on from another intelligence service that suggested that the lead hijacker, Mohamed Atta, had met with Iraqi intelligence officials in Prague, Czechoslovakia. And that reporting waxed and waned where the degree of confidence in it, and so forth, has been pretty well knocked down now at this stage, that that meeting ever took place."

On September 10, 2006, Cheney responded to questions from Tim Russert about Atta in Prague on Meet the Press:

MR. RUSSERT: Any suggestion there was a meeting with Mohamed Atta, one of the hijackers, with Iraqi officials?

VICE PRES. CHENEY: No. The sequence, Tim, was, when you and I talked that morning, we had not received any reporting with respect to Mohamed Atta going to Prague. Just a few days after you and I did that show, the CIA, CIA produced an intelligence report from the Czech Intelligence Service that said Mohammad Atta, leader of the hijackers, had been in Prague in April of '01 and had met with the senior Iraqi intelligence official in Prague. That was the first report we had that he'd been to Prague and met with Iraqis. Later on, some period of time after that, the CIA produced another report based on a photographer—on a photograph that was taken in Prague of a man they claim 70 percent probability was Mohammad Atta on another occasion. This was the reporting we received from the CIA when I responded to your question and said it had been pretty well confirmed that he'd been in Prague. The—later on, they were unable to confirm it. Later on, they backed off of it.

But what I told you was exactly what we were receiving at the time. It never said, and I don't believe I ever said, specifically, that it linked the Iraqis to 9/11. It specifically said he had been in Prague, Mohamed Atta had been in Prague and we didn't know ...

MR. RUSSERT: And the meeting with Atta did not occur?

VICE PRES. CHENEY: We don't know. I mean, we've never been able to, to, to link it, and the FBI and CIA have worked it aggressively. I would say, at this point, nobody has been able to confirm ...

== Senate Report of Pre-war Intelligence on Iraq ==
On September 8, 2006, the United States Senate Select Committee on Intelligence released "Phase II" of its report on prewar intelligence on Iraq. In the report, the following is stated regarding Atta in Prague:

Postwar findings support CIA's January 2003 assessment, which judged that "the most reliable reporting casts doubt" on ... an alleged meeting between Mohamed Atta and an Iraqi intelligence officer in Prague, and confirm that no such meeting occurred ... Prewar assessments described reporting on the Atta lead as contradictory and unverified. In September 2002, CIA assessed that some evidence asserted that the two met, and some cast doubt on the possibility. By January 2003, CIA assessed that ... they were "increasingly skeptical that Atta traveled to Prague in 2001 or met with IIS officer al-Ani." Postwar debriefings of al-Ani indicate that he had never seen or heard of Atta until after September 11, 2001, when Atta's face appeared on the news.

The report also contains a full page of information with regards to Atta in Prague that was redacted. Newsweek reports that the blacked-out portion of the Report involved a CIA cable that lays out the controversy. According to Newsweek, "Democrats charged in a written statement that intelligence officials had failed to demonstrate 'that disclosing the [cable] ... would reveal sources and methods or otherwise harm national security.' The Democrats also complained that officials' refusal to declassify the cable 'represents an improper use of classification authority by the intelligence community to shield the White House.'" Newsweek goes on to report:

According to two sources familiar with the blacked-out portions of the Senate report that discuss the CIA cable's contents, the document indicates that White House officials had proposed mentioning the supposed Atta-Prague meeting in a Bush speech scheduled for March 14, 2003 ... According to one of the sources familiar with the Senate report's censored portions, who asked for anonymity due to the sensitivity of the subject, the tone of the CIA cable was 'strident' and expressed dismay that the White House was trying to shoehorn the Atta anecdote into the Bush speech to be delivered only days before the U.S. invasion of Iraq. The source said the cable also suggested that policymakers had tried to insert the same anecdote into other speeches by top administration officials. A second source familiar with the Senate report, however, maintained that it could be read as routine give-and-take between policymakers asking legitimate questions about intelligence reporting and field operatives giving respectful responses. Both sources familiar with the report acknowledge that there is no proof the White House saw the cable, and thus it is unclear whether the CIA document had any bearing on the fact that Bush never mentioned the Atta anecdote in a speech.

CIA spokesman Paul Gimigliano asserted that the classification had nothing to do with protecting the Bush Administration: "When CIA did not agree to a specific public release, its case was based on current intelligence equities and a desire to preserve the candor essential to good internal discussion of complex issues. It's simply wrong to suggest the goal was to protect the White House."

== See also ==
- Saddam Hussein and al-Qaeda link allegations
