= Iraq War scandal =

Iraq War Scandal may refer to several events connected to the Iraq War:

- Iraq War misappropriations
- Habbush letter
