= The Way of the World (book) =

2008 non-fiction book by Ron Suskind

The Way of the World: A Story of Truth and Hope in an Age of Extremism
- Author: Ron Suskind
- Language: English
- Subject: Politics
- Publisher: Harper
- Publication date: August 5, 2008
- Publication place: United States
- Pages: 432
- ISBN: 978-0-06-143062-6
- OCLC: 232118567

The Way of the World: A Story of Truth and Hope in an Age of Extremism is a 2008 non-fiction book by Ron Suskind, reporting on various actions and policies of the George W. Bush administration. Most notably, it alleges that the Bush administration ordered the forgery of the Habbush letter to implicate Iraq as having ties to al Qaeda and the hijackers in the September 11 attacks. All these claims have been strenuously denied by the White House and all parties involved. The book, published on August 5, 2008, by Harper, met mixed reviews but received considerable media attention and created controversy.

== Contents ==
In the book, Suskind details and describes a variety of actions, policies, and procedures of the Bush administration. The most widely publicized allegation in the book is that high-ranking White House officials ordered the Central Intelligence Agency (CIA) to forge or manufacture a justification for the Iraq War through a backdated, handwritten document—namely, the Habbush letter—linking Saddam Hussein and al-Qaeda. The letter purported to be from General Tahir Jalil Habbush al-Tikriti, the head of Iraqi Intelligence, to Saddam Hussein, detailing training which 9/11 hijacker Mohamed Atta supposedly received in Iraq and mentioning receipt of a shipment from Niger. Suskind says that the CIA forged this letter before the 2003 Iraq invasion, on an order from the White House. The author also claims that the Bush administration had information from a top Iraqi Intelligence official, General Tahir Jalil Habbush al-Tikriti, "that there were no weapons of mass destruction in Iraq—intelligence they received in plenty of time to stop an invasion". Suskind further states that Vice-President Dick Cheney implemented a set of procedures and processes designed to make the President less involved and less accountable for various controversial decisions and actions.

== Reception ==
The book received considerable media attention. Suskind was twice interviewed on the week of the book's release by Meredith Vieira, on NBC's Today show. He was interviewed on NPR's Fresh Air by Dave Davies, as well as on The Daily Show with Jon Stewart on August 11. On August 12, Suskind appeared live online at The Washington Post's "Book World Live". On August 13 and 14, he appeared on Democracy Now!, and on August 15, he appeared on Hannity & Colmes.

== CIA statement ==
On August 22, 2008, the CIA released a statement on its website regarding the allegations in Suskind's book:

In his book, The Way of the World, author Ron Suskind makes some serious charges about the CIA and Iraq. As Agency officers current and former have made clear, those charges are false. More than that, they are not in keeping with the way CIA works. In fact, they are profoundly offensive to the men and women who serve here, as they should be to all Americans.

Suskind claims that, in September 2003, the White House ordered then-Director George Tenet to fabricate a letter describing a level of cooperation between Saddam Hussein and al-Qa'ida that simply did not exist. The White House has denied making that request, and Director Tenet has denied receiving it. The former Agency officers Suskind cites in his narrative have, for their part, publicly denied being asked to carry out such a mission.

Those denials are powerful in and of themselves. But they are also backed by a thorough, time-consuming records search within CIA and by interviews with other officers—senior and junior alike—who were directly involved in Iraq operations. To assert, as Suskind does, that the White House would request such a document, and that the Agency would accept such a task, says something about him and nothing about us. It did not happen.

Two former senior British intelligence officers have also released statements taking issue with Suskind. They each describe his work as "misleading." CIA has made its own inquiries overseas and no one—no individual and no intelligence service—has substantiated Suskind’s account of Habbush or the bogus letter. At this point, the origins of the forgery, like the whereabouts of Habbush himself, remain unclear. But this much is certain: Suskind is off the mark."

When asked why the CIA had made an exception to its general practice of not commenting on books, a spokesman wrote that it was because "the allegations were so egregious—including the suggestion that the agency broke the law—that we felt a response was both necessary and appropriate".

Tenet followed the CIA release with a new statement of his own saying that it was "ridiculous to think that the White House would give me such and order and even more ridiculous to think that I would carry it out". He added that as the head of the CIA he had "consistently fought with some Administration officials to prevent them from overstating the case for Iraqi involvement in international terrorism".

The Washington Post reports that "Suskind, whose claims are now the subject of two congressional investigations, yesterday continued to stand by his book and accused the CIA and White House of orchestrating a smear campaign. 'It's the same old stuff,' said Suskind, who said his findings are supported by hours of interviews, some of them taped. 'There's not a shred of doubt about any of it.'"

== Controversies ==
=== Habbush forgery ===
One of the most controversial claims in the book is that the White House directed the CIA to forge a letter from an Iraqi intelligence official. This claim rests on Suskind's interviews with multiple sources, including three former intelligence officials who spoke on the record: Robert Richer and John Maguire from the CIA and Nigel Inkster from the British foreign intelligence service, MI6.

All three men have issued public statements responding to the controversy. Robert Richer, the CIA's former deputy director of clandestine operations, said: "I never received direction from George Tenet or anyone else in my chain of command to fabricate a document ... as outlined in Mr. Suskind's book." Richer also says that he reviewed the book before it was published, and told Suskind he had got it wrong. Richer stated that he was considering legal action against Suskind.

John Maguire, who headed the CIA's Iraq Operations Group, issued a statement through Richer saying: "I never received any instruction from then Chief/NE Rob Richer or any other officer in my chain of command instructing me to fabricate such a letter." Nigel Inkster called Suskind's allegations "inaccurate and misleading", saying: "Mr Suskind's characterisation of our meeting is more the stuff of creative fiction than serious reportage, and seeks to make more of it than the circumstances or the content warranted."

The White House also denied the allegation. Deputy press secretary, Tony Fratto, said: "The notion that the White House directed anyone to forge a letter from Habbush to Saddam Hussein is absurd." George Tenet, the former Director of Central Intelligence, said that "there was no such order from the White House to me nor, to the best of my knowledge, was anyone from CIA ever involved in any such effort", adding: "The notion that I would suddenly reverse our stance and have created and planted false evidence that was contrary to our own beliefs is ridiculous."

==== Suskind's response to his critics ====
Suskind responded in an interview to Richer's statement, saying: "You know, that’s a very narrow legalistic response of—lawyers in Washington have called, saying that’s actually a non-denial denial, because, in terms of chain of command, Rob Richer is not actually on George’s chain of command, if you will. It goes around to Rob Richer."

After Suskind posted his partial transcript, Richer issued a second statement, saying: "Mr. Suskind has now released an edited transcript of an apparent conversation between us that he alleges supports one of the central themes in his book. It does not. I stand by my earlier statement and my absolute belief that the charges outlined in Mr. Suskind's book regarding Agency involvement in forging documents are not true." Suskind has also claimed that Richer came under pressure to release his statement; on an interview with National Public Radio, he stated:

Regarding Maguire's statement, Suskind noted:

The book doesn’t allege anything that he's stating there. The book shows clearly what happened. Maguire — as people read the book, they’re like, that statement doesn’t actually reflect what’s in the book. The book just shows him talking to Rob Richer – Maguire – about the letter, about its contents, about generally its origin. And at that point, Maguire was moving on to a new job, so I say in the book it’s passed to Maguire’s successor for execution. So there’s an example where Maguire, who had not read the book at that point, had it characterized wrongly by Richer, whomever Richer was working with, and then responded to something not in the book. You know, it’s interesting, because this is part of a kind of practice of careful sort of kick-up-the-dust deception, in terms of statements like this that experienced reporters have seen from time to time.

In another interview with Democracy Now!, Suskind claims that he confirmed the claims of Richer and Maguire in several interviews: "The fact is, is it’s not a matter of a passing conversation. We had many conversations on this specific issue, on the Habbush matter, with all of the key sources. There was never any mystery about what it was, what the Habbush letter was, what the Habbush mission entailed, in terms of the setup with the Iraq intelligence chief. I mean, exhaustive, hour after hour. And the way I do it as an investigative reporter, is you go back again and again and again." And in the NPR interview, he claims that both Richer and Maguire had indicated a willingness to testify against the administration about these allegations: "both of them, frankly, are big believers in the truth process. And I've talked to both of them about, 'Hey, you're never going to feel heat quite like this.' And they said, both of them, Richer and Maguire, 'I'm ready to go in front of Senate committees and House committees. I'm ready to have my moment.' They knew everything that was in the book. You know, once they get there and the moment arrives, sometimes their knees buckle. And then you kind of say, 'All right, let's take a deep breath.' And you get them upright, and they tend to often then walk forward."

Responding to Tenet, Suskind admitted that he had not spoken to Tenet about the allegation.

Suskind responded to the White House's claim that he "has chosen to dwell in the netherworld of bizarre conspiracy theories" by stating that they were "all but obligated to deny this".

Dan Froomkin of The Washington Post elaborated: "The allegation in Ron Suskind's new book that the White House ordered the CIA to forge evidence of a link between Iraq and al Qaeda is so incredibly grave that it demands a serious response from the government. If what Suskind writes is true – or even partially true – someone at the highest levels of the White House engaged in a criminal conspiracy to deceive the American public ... But so far, we've gotten mostly hyperbole, innuendo and narrowly constructed denials." He goes on:

White House spokesman Tony Fratto's response was: "The notion that the White House directed anyone to forge a letter from [former Iraqi intelligence chief Tahir Jalil] Habbush to Saddam Hussein is absurd," he said. He accused Suskind, a Pulitzer-Prize winning investigative reporter and well-respected chronicler of Bush administration secrets, of engaging in "gutter journalism."

The White House yesterday also distributed a statement of two former CIA officials who were key sources for Suskind's book. "I never received direction from George Tenet or anyone else in my chain of command to fabricate a document from Habbush as outlined in Mr. Suskind's book," Robert Richer, the CIA's former deputy director of clandestine operations, said in the statement. And John Maguire, who headed the CIA's Iraq Operations Group at the time in question stated: "I never received any instruction from then Chief/NE Rob Richer or any other officer in my chain of command instructing me to fabricate such a letter. Further, I have no knowledge to the origins of the letter and as to how it circulated in Iraq."

Former CIA director George Tenet said in statement: "There was no such order from the White House to me nor, to the best of my knowledge, was anyone from CIA ever involved in any such effort."

=== Congressional investigation ===
The House Judiciary Committee announced plans to investigate the allegations. Committee Chairman John Conyers has called it "the most critical investigation of the entire Bush administration".

Conyers' office issued letters directing some of the principals allegedly involved in the forgery to appear before the committee for questioning. These included Rob Richer, Assistant to the Vice President for National Security Affairs John P. Hannah, and former chief of staff to the Vice President Lewis I. "Scooter" Libby, who was convicted of perjury and obstruction of justice for his involvement in the Valerie Plame scandal, as well as George Tenet, John Maguire, and A.B. "Buzzy" Krongard (the number three-man at the CIA, who Suskind says also confirmed the allegations).

=== WMD distortions ===
Another controversial claim in the book is that former Iraqi Intelligence Chief Habbush had told American and British intelligence that there were no weapons of mass destruction in Iraq; this claim was controversial because the British and U.S. governments had been insisting at the time that such weapons did exist, and went to war in Iraq in part on the strength of the evidence of the existence of such weapons programs. Suskind's claim would suggest that the U.S. and UK may have known all along that there were no such weapons in Iraq. Suskind was interviewed on BBC Radio 4 on August 19, 2008. BBC security correspondent Gordon Corera followed the interview by reading a statement from former MI6 chief Sir Richard Dearlove, in which Dearlove said:

Suskind's book is misleading. His conclusions and most of his central facts, as far as they refer to issues which I know about, are quite simply wrong. His imaginative use of his meeting with me to substantiate his own thesis I find unacceptable.

After reading the statement, Corera emphasized that the sources he spoke with "were careful not to deny that a meeting did take place with the Iraqi intelligence chief on the eve of war in which this man Habbush denied Saddam had any weapons. But I think the key question is whether he was meeting MI6 as a spy providing secret intelligence on Saddam, in which case his information might have been taken very seriously, or whether, in fact, this was a back channel that Saddam Hussein himself had authorized, and that therefore this Iraqi intelligence chief Habbush was simply saying what other Iraqi intelligence officials were already saying."

== Book reviews ==
In his assessment for the Literary Review, Michael Burleigh noted the linked vignettes that formed the bedrock of the narrative: "Using a series of interwoven stories, some hopeful, others disturbing, Suskind explores whether the United States and the Muslim world will ever be able to find mutual respect and understanding ... This is a hugely important field that has never been so well examined." Similar encomium was used in analyzing Suskind's capabilities as a storyteller. The Sunday Times declared: "Suskind is never unsympathetic to his characters, who he appears to have debriefed intensively. He is a romantic, a writer who clearly believes that his country has betrayed its past, its values and its moral compass by failing to tell the truth about the war." Perhaps the most substantial testament to Suskind's return to a narrative style came from the New York Observer. "Moving ... Mr. Suskind is a prodigiously talented craftsman ... It’s all here: a cast of characters that sprawls across class and circumstance to represent the totality of a historical moment ... These hard times, Mr. Suskind’s book suggests, call for a nonfiction Dickens."

=== The New York Times ===
Reviewing the book for The New York Times, Mark Danner wrote:

In a crowded, highly talented field, Mr. Suskind bids fair to claim the crown as the most perceptive, incisive, dogged chronicler of the inner workings of the Bush administration ... Behind the highly promoted scandals in The Way of the World lies a complex web of intersecting stories, the plotlines of a varied traveling company of actors whose doings Mr. Suskind chronicles with meticulous care ... These narratives and others perform, in Mr. Suskind's hands, an intricate arabesque and manage, to a rather remarkable degree, to show us, in this age of terror, "the true way of the world." Amid the intense and vivid storytelling here, Mr. Suskind takes many risks and not all succeed; the book will be criticized for sentimentality and a kind of wide-eyed, communal optimism that are easy to ridicule. Still, the reporting is solid and often sublime.

=== Los Angeles Times ===
The Los Angeles Times's Tim Rutten was critical of The Way of the World, calling it "structurally a mess" and as "a work of literary nonfiction ... an irritating example of overreaching". Speaking of the book's conception, Rutten muses that "Suskind, mindful that the Bush/Cheney administration is staggering to inglorious conclusion, intended this book to look to the future as well as back to the recent past - to suggest, in some fashion, a way forward". Rutten credits Suskind, too, writing that "Suskind's reporting continues to make him an indispensable chronicler of the Bush/Cheney debacle"; and he weighs in to support Suskind on the controversy surrounding the Habbush letter, saying of the transcript posted on Suskind's website: "It not only supports Suskind's account as written, but shows he took a conservative approach toward his material."

=== Bloomberg ===
Reviewing the book for Bloomberg, Timothy R. Homan writes:

The Way of the World is really two books in one. The first, of course, is an investigation into the way the administration under President George W. Bush has crafted its post-9/11 doctrine. The second, somewhat incompatible book describes the experiences of foreigners, from an Afghan high school exchange student to a young Pakistani professional, living in 21st-century America. These stories read like a modern-day, political Canterbury Tales ... While the melding of investigative reporting with personal narratives showcases the range of Suskind's writing skills, the staccato format ultimately proves jarring and incoherent.

== See also ==
- Allegations of misappropriations related to the Iraq War
