= 1990 Iraqi coup attempt =

- Location: Baghdad, Iraq
- Planned by: Captain Satam Ghannam al-Jabouri (executed)
- Objective: Overthrow of Saddam Hussein regime
- Date: 6 January 1990
- Outcome: Failed after the plan was leaked The torture and execution of the conspirators or suspected participants

On 6 January 1990, coinciding with the commemoration of Army Day, a military operation planned to overthrow the regime of President Saddam Hussein through his assassination was attempted. At that time, Saddam had ruled Iraq for about 10 years. Members of the major al-Jabour tribe led the operation, most prominently Captain Satam Ghannam al-Jabouri and a number of sympathetic officers from within the tribe. Relying on their assignment within Saddam's security detail, the plotters argued they had the necessary leverage to carry out a coup. Their objective was to install leadership from their own tribe, which significantly outnumbered Saddam’s al-Bu Nasir tribe. The operation drew inspiration for its execution from the 1981 assassination of Sadat, which occurred during a military parade. The conspiracy was discovered and those involved were executed. The operation led to Saddam Hussein avoiding military parades for a period.

== See also ==
- 1996 Iraqi coup attempt
