= Iraqi coup d'état =

There have been at least 6 coups d'état in the state of Iraq, and one attempt.

- 1936 Iraqi coup d'état, Baqr Sidki took power by a military coup in Iraq
- 1941 Iraqi coup d'état, anti-British and pro-German military coup in Iraq
- 1958 Iraqi coup d'état, or 14 July Revolution, marking the overthrow of the Hashemite monarchy established by King Faisal I
- February 1963 Iraqi coup d'état, or Ramadan Revolution, Ba'athist coup against Abd al-Karim Qasim
- November 1963 Iraqi coup d'état, Bloodless pro-Nasserist coup against Ba'athists
- 1968 Iraqi coup d'état, or 17 July Revolution, bloodless coup led by General Ahmed Hassan al-Bakr
- 1996 Iraqi coup d'état attempt
