= Saadoun Shakir =

Saadoun Shakir was an Iraqi politician and intelligence official. He served as the first director of Mukhabarat, the Iraqi Intelligence Service, from 1973 to 1977. A cousin of Saddam Hussein and a member of the Baath Party, he had previously helped run a cell of Jihaz Haneen, a paramilitary organization. In 1979, he was appointed as Iraq's Minister of Interior.
