= Mukhabarat =

Mukhābarāt (Arabic: مخابرات, romanized: muḫābarāt), is the Arabic term for intelligence, as used by an intelligence agency. In most of the Middle East, the term is colloquially used for secret police agents who spy on civilians. Organizations using the name include:

== Egypt ==
- General Intelligence Service (Egypt) (Gihaz al-Mukhabarat al-Amma)
- Military Intelligence and Reconnaissance (Egypt) (Idarat El Mukhabarat El Ḥarbiya Wel Istitlaʾ)

== Iraq ==
=== Ba'athist era ===
- Iraqi Intelligence Service (Jihaz al-Mukhabarat al-Amma)
- Directorate of General Military Intelligence

=== Post-Ba'athist era ===
- Iraqi National Intelligence Service (INIS) (Jihaz al-Mukhabarat al-Watanii al-Eiraqii)

== Jordan ==
- General Intelligence Department (Jordan) (Dairat al-Mukhabarat al-Ammah)

== Libya ==
- Intelligence of the Jamahiriya (Mukhabarat el-Jamahiriya), under Muammar Gaddafi

== Palestine ==
- General Intelligence Service (Palestine) (jihaz al-mukhābarāt al-ʻĀmmah)
- Military Intelligence (Palestine) (al-mukhābarāt al-'Askariyah)

== Saudi Arabia ==
- General Intelligence Presidency (Al Mukhabarat Al A'amah)

== Sudan ==
- General Intelligence Service (Sudan) (jihaz al-mukhābarāt al-ʻĀmmah)

== Syria ==
=== Ba'athist era ===
- National Security Bureau (Maktab al'Amn Alwatanii)
- Political Security Directorate (Idarat al-Amn al-Siyasi)
- Military Intelligence Directorate (Syria) (Shu'bat al-Mukhabarat al-'Askariyya)
- Air Force Intelligence Directorate (Idarat al-Mukhabarat al-Jawiyya)
- General Intelligence Directorate (Syria) (Idarat al-Mukhabarat al-Amma)
- Presidential Intelligence Committee

=== Post-Ba'athist era ===
- General Intelligence Service (Jihāz al-Mukhābarāt al-‘Āmmā)

== See also ==
- List of intelligence agencies
