= Con Coughlin =

British journalist and author (born 1955)

- Born: 14 January 1955 (age 71); London, England
- Education: Christ's Hospital; Brasenose College, Oxford
- Occupations: Journalist, author
- Employer: The Daily Telegraph

Con Coughlin (born 14 January 1955) is a British journalist and author, currently The Daily Telegraph executive defence editor.

== Early life ==
Coughlin was born in 1955 in London, England. He read Modern History at Brasenose College, Oxford, where he specialised in the Industrial Revolution under the tutelage of the historian Simon Schama.

== Journalistic career ==
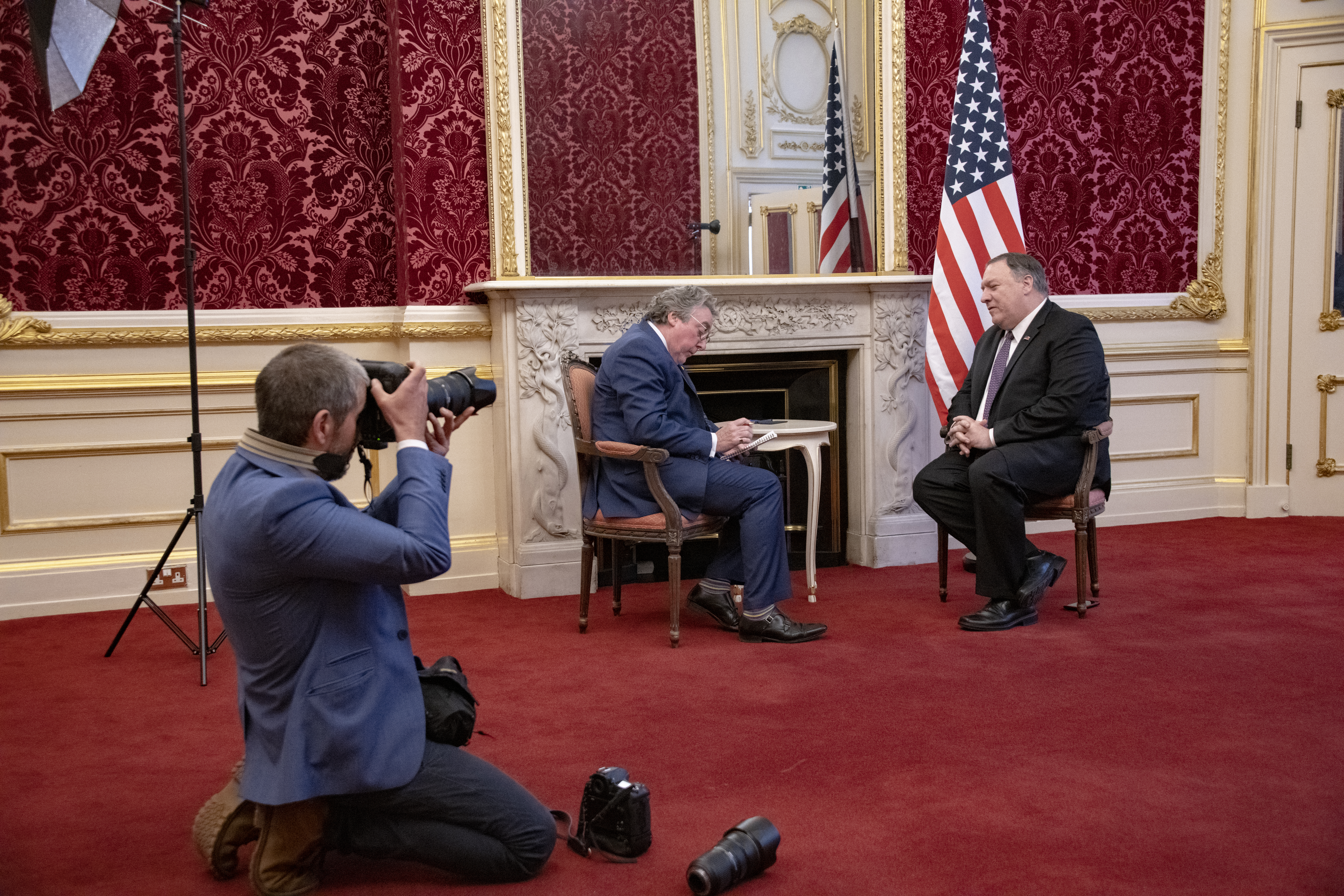
Coughlin interviewing Mike Pompeo in May 2019

In August 1977 Coughlin joined the Thomson Regional Newspapers graduate trainee course and after undertaking his initial training in Cardiff served out his indentures as a trainee reporter with the Reading Evening Post. In November 1980 Coughlin joined The Daily Telegraph as a general news reporter. Coughlin has spent most of his journalistic career working for what is now the Telegraph Media Group.

As a young reporter for his newspaper, he was initially given responsibility for covering a number of major crime stories, such as the arrest of Peter Sutcliffe (dubbed the Yorkshire Ripper) and the Brixton riots.

Becoming a foreign correspondent, his first big assignment was to cover the American invasion of Grenada in late 1983. From there he was sent to Beirut during the Lebanese civil war where he developed his interest in the Middle East and international terrorism. After the Telegraph group was bought in 1985 by the Canadian businessman Conrad Black, Coughlin was appointed The Daily Telegraph's Middle East correspondent by Max Hastings, the newspaper's new editor.

Coughlin opened the newspaper's bureau in Jerusalem, and spent the next three years covering a multitude of stories throughout the region. In April 1986 he narrowly escaped being kidnapped by Hezbollah fighters in Beirut, the day before another British journalist John McCarthy was kidnapped. In March 2009 Coughlin recalled this experience in My Alter Ego, a programme for BBC Radio 4. In 1989 Coughlin returned to London, where he transferred to The Sunday Telegraph and was appointed the newspaper's chief foreign correspondent. During the next few years he received several promotions, becoming Foreign Editor in 1997 and Executive Editor in 1999. The following year The Sunday Telegraph won the prestigious "newspaper of the year" award at the British Press Awards.

He has appeared as a foreign-affairs analyst on the American networks CNN, Fox News, CBS, ABC and MSNBC and NBC. In Britain he broadcasts regularly for the BBC and Sky News.

In 2006 Coughlin rejoined The Daily Telegraph as the newspaper's defence and security editor after a brief spell writing for the Daily Mail, and later that year was promoted to the post of executive foreign editor. He writes a weekly column, "Inside Abroad", and comments on a broad range of subjects, with a special interest in defence and security issues, the Middle East and international terrorism. He maintains a blog for the Telegraph's website.

== Author ==
Coughlin is the author of several books. His first book was Hostage: The Complete Story of the Lebanon Captives (Little, Brown 1992), which was followed by a study of the politics of modern Jerusalem, A Golden Basin Full of Scorpions which was BBC correspondent John Simpson's "book of the year" and was described as "excellent, a brilliant book" by the author A. N. Wilson.

In 2002 Coughlin published a biography of Saddam Hussein. The American edition, Saddam: King of Terror (ECCO) was a New York Times best-seller in 2003, and received international critical acclaim.

His next book, American Ally: Tony Blair and the War on Terror (ECCO, 2006) was nominated Kirkus Reviews books of the year. In 2009 Coughlin published Khomeini's Ghost (Macmillan, London, and ECCO, New York City) a study of the life of Ayatollah Khomeini and his impact on the radicalisation of the Islamic world during the previous thirty years. Historian Dominic Sandbrook, reviewing Khomeini's Ghost in The Observer, wrote: "Readers already familiar with recent Iranian history will not discover much new information in Coughlin's account, but it nevertheless makes a very readable and entertaining introduction to a nation badly misunderstood in the west. And while Coughlin makes no secret of his deep antipathy to the Iranian government, his treatment of its founder is satisfyingly nuanced". Iranian-American journalist Azadeh Moaveni, in a review for The New York Times, asserted that the book contained factual errors and misrepresentations of facts, the author having documents out of context to bolster his argument.

In January 2014 Thomas Dunne Books published Coughlin's book on Churchill's First War: Young Winston at War with the Afghans.

In addition Coughlin has regularly written for several other publications including The Spectator, The Wall Street Journal and The Atlantic Monthly.

=== Gaddafi legal case ===
Telegraph Newspapers apologised for a libel against Saif al-Islam Gaddafi in April 2002. The Sunday Telegraph had published an article by Coughlin in November 1995, then the newspaper's chief foreign correspondent (and a piece for the newspaper's Mandrake column, published during the following month, which quoted Coughlin) alleging that Saif al-Islam Gaddafi was involved in a massive criminal operation with Iranian officials that involved counterfeit notes and money laundering in Europe based on information received by British intelligence and banking officials. The Sunday Telegraph was served with a libel writ by Saif al-Islam Gaddafi. The original story followed a lunch given by Malcolm Rifkind, then Foreign Secretary, at which editor Charles Moore and colleagues were present, and later briefings given to Coughlin by MI6 agents who had insisted on the preservation of their anonymity.

After a hearing at the Court of Appeal in October 1998, it was established that the journalists had a right to bring the story before the public under the Qualified privilege, under the Reynold's Defence rules established by an earlier case, Reynolds v Times Newspapers Ltd the previous July.

The main court case followed in 2002, which was defended by the Telegraph Group and was eventually settled out of court without any damages being paid, and with both sides agreeing to pay their own costs. In 2002 Geoffrey Robertson QC made a statement on behalf of the Telegraph Group stating "there was no truth in the allegation that Saif al-Islam Gaddafi participated in any currency sting".

=== Habbush letter ===
In late 2003, in a front-page exclusive story, Coughlin revealed a leaked intelligence memorandum, purportedly uncovered by Iraq's interim government, which detailed a meeting between Mohamed Atta, one of the 11 September hijackers, and Iraqi intelligence at the time of Saddam Hussein. The memo was supposedly written by Iraqi security chief General Tahir Jalil Habbush al-Tikriti to the president of Iraq. The report was subsequently challenged with American officials also reiterating that there was no such link.

The Daily Telegraph's report was repeated by several conservative columnists in the United States, including Deroy Murdock and William Safire.

=== Turkey ===
In 2010 Coughlin alleged that the Turkish Prime Minister, Recep Tayyip Erdoğan, had negotiated a deal with Iran for Tehran to make a $25 million contribution to the campaign funds of Turkey's ruling party.

Immediately after the publication of the article, Turkish Government rebutted all allegations and asked the newspaper to remove Coughlin's article from its website. Justice and Development Party also demanded an apology for publishing what it called an article without any sources but with many lies in it.

The Daily Telegraph lost the libel lawsuit Erdoğan filed in UK. As a result, he won "a substantial sum" in libel damages and an apology was published by the newspaper.

== Views ==
=== On civil liberties of terrorist suspects ===
In April 2009, Coughlin wrote an article entitled "My advice to Obama: Don't pick a fight with Dick Cheney", which was published on the Telegraph's website. In the article, which followed claims that US forces had waterboarded an Al Qaeda suspect 183 times, Coughlin argued that: "There are always two sides to a story, even a deeply unpleasant one such as waterboarding an al-Qaeda suspect", before asking "what if, as Mr Cheney is now suggesting, these brutal interrogation methods actually produced information that saved lives by thwarting potential al-Qaeda attacks?". Coughlin suggested that the problem posed "an interesting ethical dilemma", namely: "Are interrogation methods like waterboarding justified if they save lives, or should we respect the detainees' human rights, thereby enabling the terror attacks to take place and claim innocent lives? I know which option I'd go for". Coughlin has continued to write articles supporting the use of torture, for example on 10 February 2010 "When the next bomb goes off in London, blame the judges".

=== On China ===
In March 2020, Coughlin wrote a column in The Daily Telegraph accusing the Chinese Communist Party (CCP) of being a corrupt elite that has no interest in protecting the interests of its citizens, nor those of the world beyond, and that it does to want to be held accountable for its role in handling the COVID-19 pandemic.

In April 2020, he wrote in another column suggesting readers should treat China like a hostile state due to what he referred to as a lack of transparency and cooperation in its response to the COVID-19 pandemic, and accused China of launching a disinformation campaign seeking to portray itself as a victim and clear itself of responsibility for the global health crisis.

== Criticism ==
Coughlin has been criticised by media monitoring organisations for his use of the terms “Islamist” and “Islamism”, with critics arguing that his reporting on figures such as Jamal Khashoggi and Saudi Crown Prince Mohammed bin Salman repeated official Saudi framing without sufficient critical scrutiny.

In 2018, Guardian columnist Owen Jones had criticised Coughlin for producing pro-Saudi and intelligence-aligned reporting, including publishing claims later shown to be false in relation to the Iraq War.

Media offices
Preceded by John Keegan	Defence Editor of The Daily Telegraph; 2006–present	Incumbent
