= Robert Richer =

Robert G Richer was the associate deputy director of operations of the United States Central Intelligence Agency, the number two in clandestine service, responsible for human intelligence operations overseas. He took early retirement in September 2005, after only 10 months on the job, with reports that he "lacked confidence in the agency's leadership" and had "operational issues."

A former enlisted Marine and officer from 1972 to 1983. He served with the CIA for 35 years including assignment as chief of station (COS) in Muscat, Oman and Amman, Jordan from 1999 to 2001. Richer was the former chief of the Near East and South Asia Division from 2002 to 2004 responsible for clandestine operations throughout the Middle East and South Asia. Richer was awarded the Intelligence Commendation Medal in 1993 and 1996, the Director's Award in 2004 and the Distinguished Career Intelligence Medal. After leaving the CIA, Richer worked for Blackwater USA as vice-president for intelligence.

In 2007, Richer created Total Intelligence Solutions with Cofer Black and Matthew G. Devost, co-founder and president of the Terrorism Research Center, which, according to Richer, "is about delivering evolved intelligence and security solutions to the world's most demanding customers."

Richer is featured in the 2008 bestselling book The Way of the World by journalist Ron Suskind, who alleges Richer was involved in fabricating the Habbush letter, which appeared to show a link between Al Qaeda and the government of Saddam Hussein. Richer publicly denies several of the book's claims.

Richer resides in the Washington, D.C. area with his family.
