= Mohammed Abdullah al-Shahwani =

Iraqi general

- محمد عبد الله الشاهواني

Director of the Iraqi National Intelligence Service
- In office April 2004 – August 2009
- Preceded by: Position established
- Succeeded by: Zuheir Fadel Abbas al-Ghirbawi

Personal details
- Born: April 4, 1938 (age 88) Mosul, Kingdom of Iraq

Military service
- Allegiance: (Iraq)
- Branch/service: Iraqi Army
- Years of service: 1955–1989
- Rank: Brig. Gen.
- Unit: Republican Guard
- Battles/wars: Yom Kippur War; Iran–Iraq War

Mohammed Abdullah al-Shahwani is an Iraqi general and the former director of the Iraqi National Intelligence Service.

== Early life and military service ==
Al-Shahwani is a Sunni Turkmen born in either Mosul or Kirkuk and began his career as an international athlete; in 1963 he competed in a decathlon in Jakarta, Indonesia where he won a gold medal. In 1967 he was sent by Iraq to the U.S. Army Ranger School, and in the 1980s he was promoted to head of the Iraqi Special Forces School. During the first half of the Iran–Iraq War (1980–1988) al-Shahwani was a Brigadier General in charge of a Republican Guard helicopter unit. He made a name for himself by retaking Kardamand mountain in Iraqi Kurdistan from an entrenched Iranian force that numbered in the thousands in an air assault; because of this, President Saddam Hussein viewed him as a potential threat and subsequently placed him under the surveillance of the Iraqi Intelligence Service in 1984. He was finally arrested and interrogated in 1989, so in May 1990 al-Shahwani decided to defect to London.

== Hussein opposition ==
Al-Shahwani soon returned to Jordan to collect intelligence on Iraq during the Gulf War.

In fall 1994 al-Shahwani began planning a coup against Saddam Hussein with the support of his three sons then serving in the Republican Guard. Al-Shahwani also brought in Iraqi National Accord leader Iyad Allawi, who in turn informed MI6, and consequently the CIA. The CIA-directed coup was foiled by Iraqi security in June 1996, and while al-Shahwani was able to escape, hundreds of Iraqi officers, including his sons, were arrested. His sons and 82 other operatives were later executed.

Between 1996 and 2003 Al-Shahwani continued building an opposition network in Iraq with the help of the CIA, and although a planned military uprising was vetoed by the Pentagon, al-Shahwani used his influence to try to convince Iraqi security forces not to resist the American-led invasion. He himself participated in covert American missions in western Iraq in the lead-up to the 2003 invasion of Iraq.

== INIS Director ==
After the initial invasion the head of the Coalition Provisional Authority, Paul Bremer, released Order 69, which established the charter for a new Iraqi National Intelligence Service (INIS). Al-Shahwani was appointed as its first director. He resigned in August 2009, which according to the Washington Post was due to disagreements with Prime Minister Nouri al-Maliki over Iranian influence in Iraq, and was replaced by General Zuheir Fadel. According to the Iraqi paper Al-Zaman, Shahwani had presented evidence linking Iran to a series of attacks in Iraq including the 19 August 2009 Baghdad bombings, and left when Iraqi leadership refused to publicly implicate Iran in the bombings. Several days later the Iranian mission to the United Nations sent a letter of protest to the Washington Post over the previous article, claiming that Shahwani's statements about Iranian involvement were baseless.

== Personal life ==
Shawani is married to a Shiite. He had three sons, Major Anmar al-Shahwani, Captain Ayead al-Shahwani, and Lt. Atheer al-Shahwani, who were killed by Saddam Hussein for plotting a coup.
