= Tahir Jalil Habbush =

Iraqi intelligence official (1950–2026)

Major General Tahir Jalil Habbush
- طاهر جليل حبوش
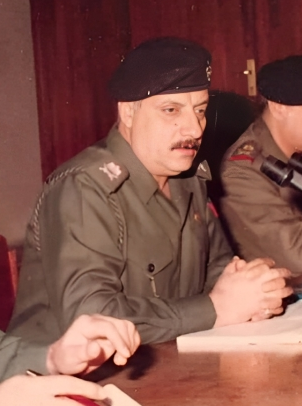
- Habbush as a Major General in 1989

Director of the Iraqi Intelligence Service
- In office 1995–2003
- Preceded by: Sabawi Ibrahim al-Tikriti
- Succeeded by: Office abolished

Director of the Directorate of General Security
- In office 1997–1999
- Preceded by: Taha Abbas al-Ahbabi
- Succeeded by: Rafi Abdul Latif Tulfah

Personal details
- Born: 1950 Tikrit, Iraq
- Died: 2 April 2026 (aged 75–76) Erbil, Iraq
- Occupation: Police officer Intelligence officer
- Awards: Mother of All Battles Medal

Military service
- Allegiance: Iraq
- Branch/service: Ministry of the Interior
- Years of service: 1970–2003
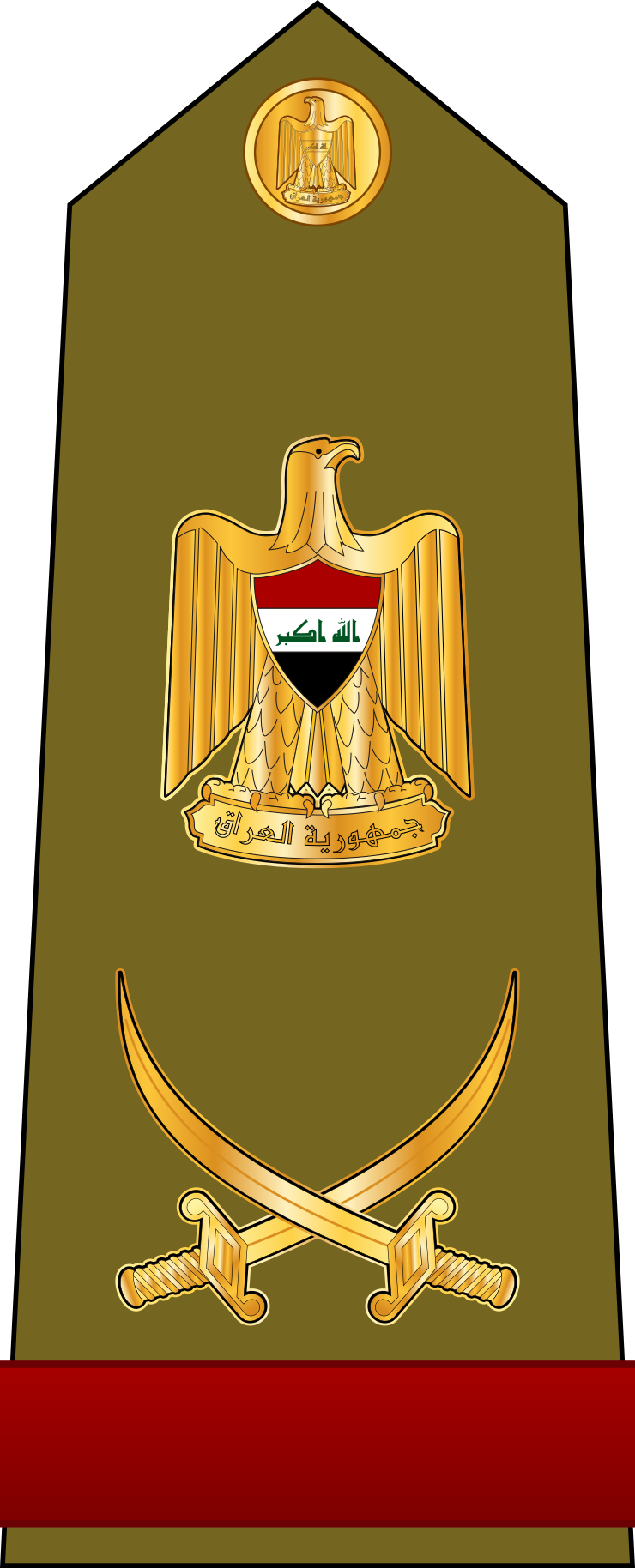
- Rank: Major General
- Unit: Iraqi Police; Iraqi Intelligence Service
- Battles/wars: Iran–Iraq War; Gulf War; 2003 Invasion of Iraq

Tahir Jalil Habbush al-Tikriti (Arabic: طاهر جليل حبوش التكريتي; 1950 – 2 April 2026) was an Iraqi intelligence official who served under the regime of Saddam Hussein. In 2001, he was Iraq's head of intelligence and as such, informed MI6 in January 2003 (shortly before the start of the Iraq War) that Iraq had no weapons of mass destruction.

Habbush was the "Jack of Diamonds" in the US deck of most-wanted Iraqi playing cards and was a fugitive with a reward of up to $1 million for information leading to his capture until his death. It is believed that al-Tikriti at some point operated from Syria and most likely played a direct role in the day-to-day operations of the insurgency against U.S.-led Coalition forces under the command of Izzat Ibrahim al-Douri.

== Forged 2003 Habbush letter ==
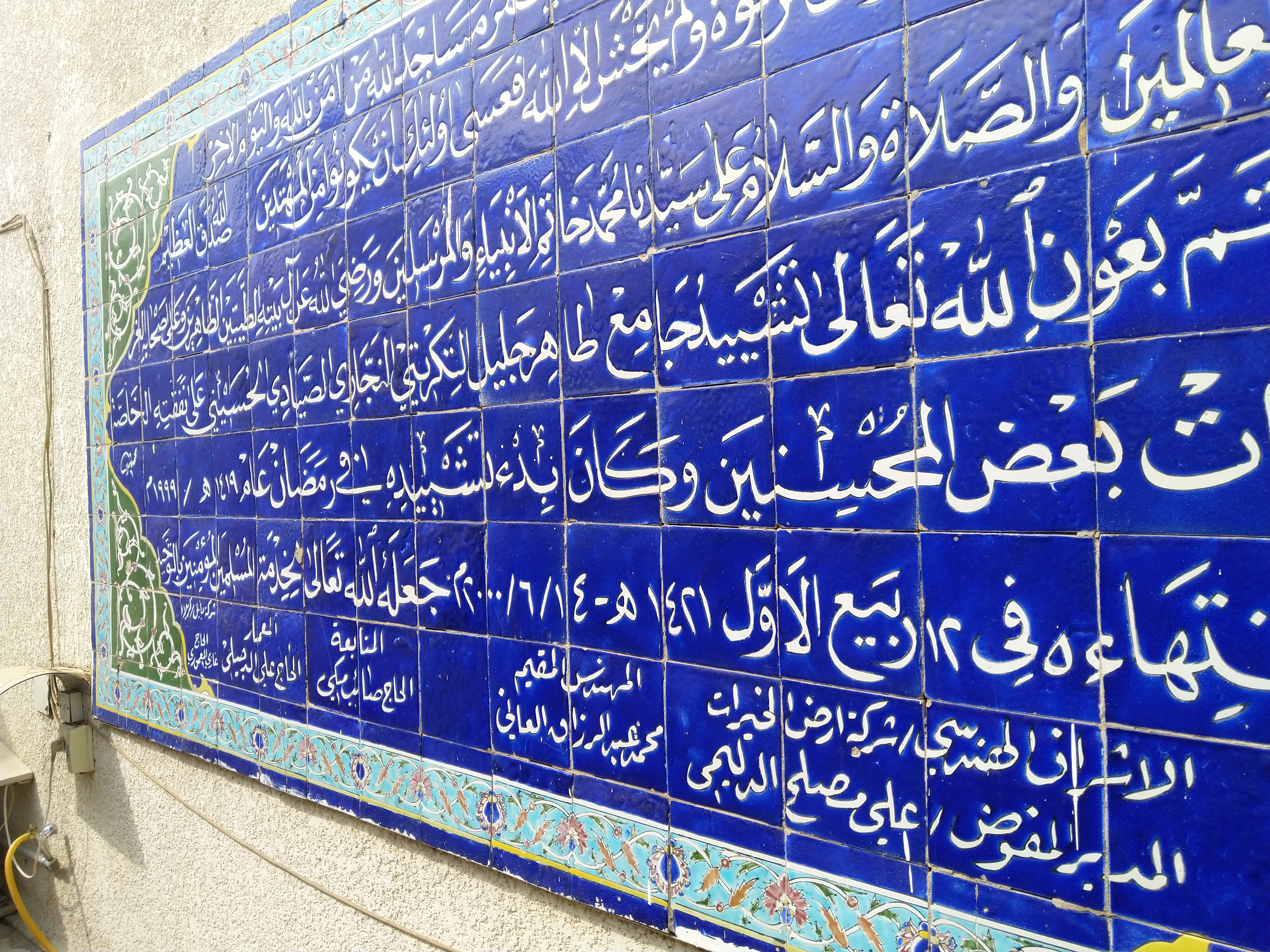
A mural in a mosque in Baghdad mentions his name as a benefactor

Habbush was the putative signatory of an alleged memo to Saddam Hussein, published in December 2003 and dated 1 July 2001, recommending Mohamed Atta to lead an attack team to destroy unspecified targets. The memo if genuine would corroborate allegations of Iraqi involvement in the attacks of September 11, 2001 which were led by Atta. The memo is believed to be a forgery. According to Newsweek, "U.S. officials and a leading Iraqi document expert [say] the document is most likely a forgery, part of a thriving new trade in dubious Iraqi documents that has cropped up in the wake of the collapse of Saddam's regime." In The Way of the World, author Ron Suskind alleges that the Bush administration itself ordered the forgery. Habbush then supposedly signed the letter, having already been resettled in Jordan with $5 million from the US.

== Sanctions ==
Habbush was listed on sanctions registers maintained by the United Nations Security Council, the European Union, and the United States Department of the Treasury.

== Escape from Iraq ==
Following the 2003 invasion of Iraq, Habbush disappeared and his whereabouts became unknown. Contemporary reports indicated that some senior Iraqi officials may have fled to neighbouring Syria during the early stages of the war, although specific details about Habbush's movements were not confirmed.

== Death ==
Habbush died from a sudden illness at a hospital in Erbil, on 2 April 2026.

== See also ==
- List of fugitives from justice who disappeared
- Mohamed Atta's alleged Prague connection
- U.S. list of most-wanted Iraqis
- Most-wanted Iraqi playing cards
