= Deroy Murdock =

American journalist

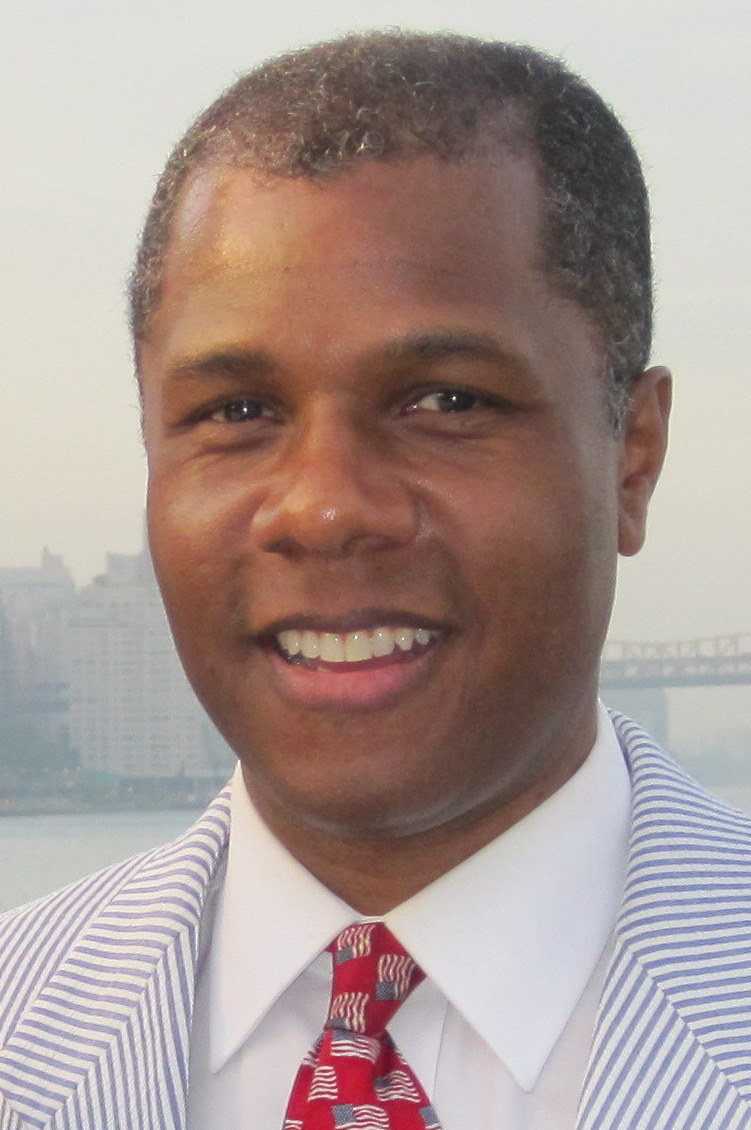
- Murdock in 2010
- Born: 1963 (age 62–63); Los Angeles, California, U.S.
- Education: Georgetown University (BA); New York University (MBA)
- Occupations: Columnist, writer, editor, political commentator
- Writing career
- Genres: Politics, journalism

Deroy Murdock (born 1963) is an American political commentator, a contributing editor with National Review Online, an emeritus media fellow of the Hoover Institution at Stanford University, and member of the Council on Foreign Relations. A native of Los Angeles, Murdock lives in New York City. A first-generation American, his parents were born in Costa Rica.

== Education ==
Deroy Murdock earned his Bachelor's Degree in Government from Georgetown University in 1986 and his Master of Business Administration in Marketing and International Business from New York University in 1989. His MBA program included a semester as an exchange student at the Chinese University of Hong Kong.

== Career ==
Murdock's columns appear in The New York Post, The Boston Herald, The Washington Times, National Review, The Orange County Register and many other newspapers and magazines in the United States and abroad. He is a Fox News Contributor whose political commentary also has aired on ABC's Nightline, NBC Nightly News, CNN, MSNBC, PBS, other television news channels, and numerous radio outlets. He is openly gay.

Murdock is also a senior fellow with the Atlas Network in Washington, D.C., and an emeritus media fellow with the Hoover Institution at Stanford University. He is a member of the Council on Foreign Relations.

Murdock has debated or made presentations in foreign countries and at organizations such as the National Academy of Sciences, the Cato Institute, Harvard Medical School, the Council on Foreign Relations, the Heritage Foundation, and Stanford, Tulane, USC, and Dartmouth universities.

Murdock interned for U.S. senator Orrin Hatch between 1982 and 1985 and then-U.S. senator Pete Wilson in 1984. Murdock is a veteran of the 1980 and 1984 presidential campaigns of Ronald Reagan and was a communications consultant with Steve Forbes' 2000 presidential campaign.

In February 2013, Murdock joined the board of advisors of the Coalition to Reduce Spending.

Murdock was a producer of I'll Say She Is – The Lost Marx Brothers Musical, which was based on the 1924 I'll Say She Is musical comedy. The production opened in 2016, at the Connelly Theater in Manhattan's East Village.

== Views ==
Murdock opposes governmental involvement in issues relating to both gay and heterosexual marriage. He also opposes the war on drugs.

Murdock said on MSNBC's Hardball with Chris Matthews on September 16, 2007, that he believes Saddam Hussein was involved in perpetrating the September 11, 2001, terrorist attack on America. Murdock cited the holding in Smith v. Islamic Emirate of Afghanistan, 262 F. Supp. 2d 217, a federal case heard by U.S. District Judge Harold Baer Jr. who found that Hussein's Baathist government and the Taliban assisted Osama bin Laden and al-Qaeda in the September 11 attacks and ruled that the defendants, including Hussein’s Iraq, were jointly and severally liable for civil damages to the families of two killed in a September 11 attack.

== See also ==
- Black conservatism in the United States
