= 1996 Iraqi coup attempt =

Coup attempt in Iraq, June–July 1996

1996 Iraqi coup d'état attempt
- Part of CIA activities in Iraq and Aftermath of the Gulf War
Date	June–July 1996
Location	Baghdad, Iraq (with broader implications in northern Iraq/Kurdistan)
Result	Coup attempt failed: Mass arrests and executions of conspirators; Saddam Hussein remains in power

Belligerents
Iraqi government	Iraqi National Accord; CIA

Commanders and leaders
Saddam Hussein: Iraqi Mukhabarat (intelligence service)	Ayad Allawi; Mohammed Abdullah al-Shahwani

Strength
Intelligence and security forces highly rated in regime control	INA-backed officers within the Republican Guard and defectors (numbers unspecified)

Casualties and losses
None	Hundreds arrested Dozens (including ~82 operatives and al-Shahwani’s sons) executed
- Operation code-named "DBACHILLES"; compromised by double agents and intercepted communications; marked a severe blow to U.S. covert efforts in Iraq

The 1996 Iraqi coup d'état attempt was a coup d'état attempt against president Saddam Hussein and his regime, as part of a wave of attacks and assassination attempts on the president of Iraq. The attempt occurred in June 1996, when a failed coup plot against the government was planned by the United States according to the Iraqi government.

== See also ==
- Iraq War
