= Iraqi National Intelligence Service =

Government agency

- Arabic: جهاز المخابرات الوطني العراقي
- Official seal of the INIS

Agency overview
- Formed: April 2004
- Preceding agency: Mukhabarat
- Jurisdiction: Prime Minister’s Office
- Headquarters: Green Zone, Baghdad
- Employees: Classified
- Agency executive: Ali al-Zaidi, Director
- Parent agency: Independent
- Website: inis.gov.iq

The Iraqi National Intelligence Service (INIS; Arabic: جهاز المخابرات الوطني العراقي, romanized: Jihāz al-Mukhābarāt al-Waṭanī al-ʻIrāqī) is a civilian intelligence agency whose constitutional duty is to collect intelligence, assess threats to national security, and advise the Iraqi government. The INIS is subject to parliamentary oversight and reports directly to the Prime Minister of Iraq.

The INIS was created with the help of the United States Central Intelligence Agency (CIA) to replace the Mukhabarat, the main intelligence agency of the country.

== Mission ==
According to CPA Order 69, which established the INIS, it is tasked to collect intelligence and perform intelligence activities with regard to:

- Threats to the national security of Iraq.
- Terrorism and Insurgency.
- Proliferation of weapons of mass destruction, narcotics production and trafficking, and serious organized crime.
- Espionage and other acts threatening to Iraqi democracy.

Article 9 of the constitution of Iraq defines the basic duties of the agency.

According to the constitution, a law that regulates the work and defines the duties and authorities of the agency must be passed by the Council of Representatives, but as of 2024, this is yet to be implemented.

== List of Directors ==
Name	Term of office
Mohammed Abdullah al-Shahwani	2004–2009
Zuhair al-Gharbawi	2009–2016
Mustafa al-Kadhimi	2016–July 2022
Raid Jouhi	July–October 2022
Mohammed Shia al-Sudani	October 2022–December 2024
Hamid al-Shattri	December 2024–October 2026
Ali al-Zaidi	October 2026–present

== History ==
After the 2003 U.S. invasion of Iraq, the head of the Coalition Provisional Authority L. Paul Bremer disbanded Iraq's military and security services per CPA Order Number 2. As the security situation within Iraq deteriorated and Iraqi resistance to the occupation became stronger and more violent, the need for a secret service became more pressing. In December 2003, The Washington Post reported that Iyad Allawi and Nouri Badran, members of both the Iraq Interim Governing Council and the Iraqi National Accord political party, flew to the U.S. to discuss details of setting up a new secret service with the help of the CIA. The agency was to be headed by Badran and recruit many agents of Saddam Hussein's Iraqi Intelligence Service. The main objective of the new organisation was to counter the insurgency. The hiring process was aided by CIA polygraph.

In January 2004, The New York Times reported that the creation of the new agency was under way. It was to employ between 500 and 2,000 staff and be financed by the U.S. government. Ibrahim al-Janabi was said to be the main candidate for leading the agency. These efforts drew criticism from Ahmed Chalabi, another formerly exiled Iraqi politician who had good connections with the CIA, who voiced worries that the new agency might be used for the restoration of the old Ba'athist security apparatus and follow the well-established pattern of government repression.

=== Establishment ===
In April 2004, CPA head L. Paul Bremer signed Authority Order Number 69, which laid out a charter for the INIS and authorized the Iraqi Governing Council to create such an agency. Its first director is Mohammed Abdullah al-Shahwani and it has been funded from secret funds set aside within the Iraq appropriation approved by the U.S. Congress. These secret funds, totalling $3 billion over three years, are said to be destined for covert CIA operations within Iraq (as well as, to a small extent, Afghanistan). Al-Shehwani was in the Iraqi military from 1955 until 1984, fled to the UK in 1990 and lost his three sons in the 1996 failed coup organized by INA (Iraqi National Accord) and the CIA.

=== Assassinations ===
In mid-2004, 18 INIS agents were killed—ten by the Badr Organization and eight by Abu Musab al-Zarqawi's Al-Qaeda in Iraq according to al-Shahwani. He also accused the Iranian embassy in Baghdad of organizing the Badr assassinations.

In 2021, a number of members of the agency were subjected to assassination, such as: the assassination of the assistant director of monitoring in the intelligence service, Colonel Nibras Abu Ali, and the assassination of an intelligence officer in the Mansour area, west of Baghdad.

According to Iraqi sources, the assassinations come as a "reaction" from the militias towards the restrictions imposed on them by the government of Mustafa Al-Kadhimi in several areas, including changing military and security leaders, removing members affiliated with Iran-backed militas from sensitive areas such as Karrada area near the Green Zone and the airport, and arresting leaders and people affiliated with them such as Hussam Al-Azerjawi, Qassem Musleh and the leader of the assassination squad in Basra during the 2019-21 protests.
