= Nigel Inkster =

British intelligence director (born 1956)

Nigel Norman Inkster CMG (born April 1956) is the former director of operations and intelligence for the British Secret Intelligence Service (SIS, also known as MI6), and was until June 2017 the Director of Transnational Threats and Political Risk at the International Institute for Strategic Studies (IISS). Inkster remains a Senior Adviser for Cyber Security and China. He assists with IISS research that assesses the geopolitical and technological challenges posed by China.

Inkster was educated at Oxford and joined SIS in 1975, for which he served in posts in Kuala Lumpur, Athens, Buenos Aires, Bangkok, Beijing, and Hong Kong. He rose to become deputy to SIS chief Richard Dearlove, and was widely assumed to be in line for the top spot when Dearlove announced his departure in 2003 . The selection of John Scarlett instead of Inkster was the subject of considerable political controversy. Inkster was a member of the SIS board for seven years before leaving SIS in 2006.

In 2014, Inkster argued that the UK should not take part in direct military action in Syria, although supporting rebel forces was sensible.

In 2017, Inkster was appointed to the Global Commission on the Stability of Cyberspace, and served on the commission until its successful conclusion in 2019, participating in the drafting of its eight norms related to non-aggression in cyberspace. Since August 2017 he has been Director of Geopolitical and Intelligence Analysis at London-based Enodo Economics
