= Allegations of misappropriations related to the Iraq War =

== Official investigations ==
In July 2008, the United States Department of Justice investigated around 900 cases of alleged fraud committed by contractors. Similarly, the Defense Contract Audit Agency uncovered $10 billion in questionable Iraq contracts, and a US audit found that the occupation authority had lost track of reconstruction funds totalling nearly $9 billion.

Henry Waxman, then Chairman of the United States House of Representatives Committee on Oversight and Government Reform, said, "The money that's gone into waste, fraud and abuse under these contracts is just so outrageous, it's egregious. It may well turn out to be the largest war profiteering in history."

== Media investigations ==
$12 billion in U.S. currency was transported from the Federal Reserve to Baghdad in April 2003 and June 2004, where it was dispensed by the Coalition Provisional Authority. A Vanity Fair magazine report concluded that of this sum, "at least $9 billion has gone missing".

Dispatches: Iraq's Missing Billions, produced by Guardian Films (March 20, 2006).

A blog on Huffington Post alleged that there "immunized foreign contractors" were involved. US courts issued gag orders that prevent the prosecution or defense from discussing the allegations. The orders apply to 70 court cases against some top US contractors.

== Missing UN funds ==
At the start of the Iraq war, the United Nations awarded $23 billion of Iraqi money to the US-led coalition to re-develop Iraq.

== See also ==
- White House Iraq-War forgery allegations
