= Iraqi Intelligence Service =

Government intelligence agency under Saddam Hussein

- جهاز المخابرات العراقي; Jihaz Al-Mukhabarat Al-Eiraqii
- IIS logo

Agency overview
- Formed: 1973
- Preceding agency: Jihaz al Khas (Special Apparatus)
- Dissolved: 23 May 2003
- Superseding agency: Iraqi National Intelligence Service
- Jurisdiction: Government of Iraq
- Headquarters: Al-Harthiya Garrison, Baghdad 33°18′35″N 44°21′33″E
- Agency executive: Brg. Gen. Ali Hassan al-Majid (1995–2003), Director
- Parent agency: Independent

The Iraqi Intelligence Service (IIS; Arabic: جهاز المخابرات العامة العراقية, romanized: Jihaz Al-Mukhabarat Al-Eiraqii, lit. 'General Intelligence Directorate of Iraq') also known as the Mukhabarat, General Intelligence Directorate, or Party Intelligence, was an 8,000-man agency that served as the main state civilian intelligence and security agency in Iraq under Saddam Hussein.

The Iraqi Intelligence Service was primarily concerned with advancing national security through collecting and analyzing intelligence from around the world and conducting analysis and development intelligence gathering and counterintelligence systems to create national security, clandestine and covert operations, counterinsurgency, counterintelligence, counter-revolutionary, creation a civilian security network intelligence, executive protection (especially senior IIS officials and visiting dignitaries), psychological warfare operations, political warfare against target countries, support irregular warfare operations, surveillance and suppression those who disagree with the government, and threat assessment to national security. But also performed many activities inside Iraq in conjunction with the Directorate of General Security (DGS) as a secret police organization.

The most important section of the IIS was Directorate 4, the Secret Service. One of the well known directors was Rafi Daham al-Tikriti (Arabic: رافع دحام مجول التكريتي) the former Iraqi Ambassador to Turkey and the last Chief of the Iraqi Intelligence Service. The Secret Service was tasked with infiltrating both foreign and domestic governments, unions, embassies, and opposition groups. IIS often worked closely with the Iraqi Directorate of General Security (the Iraqi equivalent of the U.S. Federal Bureau of Investigation) when conducting domestic activities.

IIS is alleged to be responsible for a number of assassinations and attempted assassinations abroad. These include the assassinations of former Iraqi prime minister Abdul Razzaq an-Naif in London (July 1978), Salih Mahdi Ammash in Helsinki (January 1985), Sheikh Talib al-Suhail al-Tamimi in Beirut (April 1994), Ayatollah Mehdi al-Hakim in Sudan (January 1988) and Dr. Ayad Habashi in Rome (October 1986), as well as the attempted assassinations of President George H. W. Bush, the Emir of Kuwait Jaber Al-Ahmad Al-Sabah and the former Iraqi prime minister Ayad Allawi.

== Structure ==
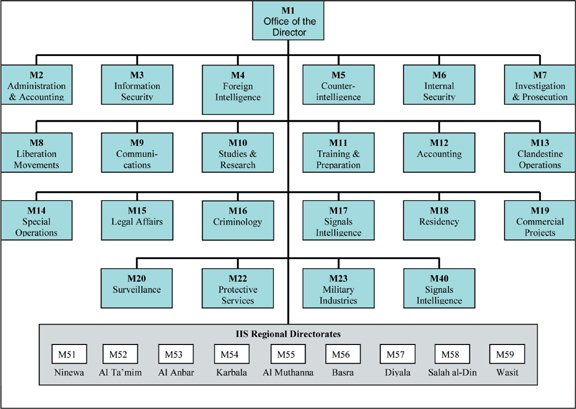

IIS was organized as a number of Bureaus which oversaw the individual directorates. The following list gives the directorates divided by bureau, and a brief description of the directorate:

=== Political Bureau ===
- Directorate 4 – Secret Service

Located inside the headquarters of the IIS, Directorate 4's activities took place in both Iraq and abroad, with agents infiltrated within Iraqi government departments, the Ba'ath Party, associations, unions and organizations, Iraqi embassies and opposition parties. In addition, the Secret Service received information from the Al Hadi Project.

The directorate included a number of offices responsible for the collection of information about a specific country or region. These offices included areas for Africa, America (North and South), Arab world, Europe, Iran, Post-Soviet states, Southeast Asia, and the Turkey. Directorate 4 worked in coordination with Directorates 3, 5, 9, 12, 14 and 18. The last director of Directorate 4 was Brigadier General Mohammed Yasin Al Shammari from Mosul.

- Directorate 8 – Technical Affairs

Located in the headquarters of the ISS, Directorate 8 was responsible for the fingerprinting of all IIS employees and the development of materials needed for covert offensive military operations. These included explosives, poisons, and weapons. Directorate 8 also assembled cameras, telecommunications equipment and employed many engineers and scientists with advanced degrees. The last director of Directorate 8 was Mohammed al-Masri, who was of Egyptian origin.

- Directorate 9 – Black Operations

One of the most important directorates within the IIS. Directorate 9's work was mostly outside Iraq in coordination with Directorates 5, 12, 14 and 18, focusing on black operations of assassination high-value targets and sabotages. The last director of Directorate 9 was Major General Abdul Hameed Khalaf al-Bayati, with Brigadier General Hussain Abdul Khaliq ad-Douri, from Dour as his Assistant Director.

- Directorate 12 – Electronic Surveillance

Responsible for the planting, monitoring, and analyzing video and audio surveillance devices within the IIS. Also partially responsible for the forging of currency.

- Directorate 17 – National Security Institute

Responsible for the training of IIS officers. Located in the Jihad district (possibly at Abu Ghraib in the western suburbs of Baghdad), it contained full living quarters and a supermarket. High-school graduates undertook a three-year course, and college graduates an 18-month course prior to entering the intelligence service as junior officers.

- Planning Office

Responsible for collecting and analyzing information from around the world, including open sources such as newspapers, radio, and satellite TV.

- Propaganda Office

Responsible for conducting political and psychological warfare operations, including the dissemination of false information.

=== Special Bureau ===
- Directorate 5 – Counter-Intelligence

Responsible for the detection and neutralization of foreign intelligence agents, with a particular focus on Syrian infiltrators. Directorate 5 works in conjunction with Directorates 3, 4, 14 and 18. Undated sources name BG Sadoon Ali al-Tikriti, from Auja as director of Directorate 5, and Lieutenant Colonel Ahmed Lahij ad-Dulaimi as Assistant Director.

- Directorate 6 – Mukhabarat Security

Responsible for the conduct of officers and other members of the IIS. Directorate 6 was responsible for the issuing of papers, passports, and marriage sanctions for all ISS employees. The last director of Directorate 6 was MG Abdul Hameed Yasin al-Ghurairi, with Colonel Ibrahim al-`Aani as his Assistant.

- Directorate 7 – Al Haakimiya

The primary interrogation center of the ISS was Al Haakimiya, located opposite the Passport Office on 52nd Street.

- Directorate 19 – Personnel Supervision

Responsible for surveillance of IIS employees.

- Directorate 22 – Protection

Responsible for personal protection of senior IIS officials and visiting dignitaries.

- Office 16

Uncertain designation. Conducted training of agents for the clandestine and covert operations abroad.

- Brigade of Mukhabarat

Rapid intervention force of the IIS, armed with light and semi-heavy weapons.

== History ==
Following an unsuccessful assassination attempt by the Ba'ath Party on Iraq's ruler Abdul Karim Qasim in October 1959, Saddam Hussein was placed in charge of Jihaz al Khas (Special Apparatus), sometime between 1964 and 1966. Codenamed Jihaz al-Haneen (Instrument of Yearning), the organisation concentrated on security and intelligence work.

After the Ba'ath Party seized power on 17 July 1968, Saddam expanded the Special Apparatus and took control of the Amn (State Internal Security Department).

Following the failed Coup d'état attempt led by Director of Internal Security Nadhim Kzar in 1973, Jihaz was transformed into Da'irat al Mukhabarat al Amah (The General Intelligence Department or the GID).

In the early 1970s, the service agents, following a tip-off, arrived at the abandoned synagogues of the Jewish community in Baghdad and confiscated thousands of titles and manuscripts and stored them in the organization's basements, where they were found in 2003 after the American invasion of Iraq by Pentagon employee Harold Rhode and with the assistance of the then opposition leader Ahmed Chalabi. The entire collection of books that later became known as the Iraqi Jewish Archive was flown to the United States, where it was preserved and digitized.

In 1983, under the leadership of Barzan Ibrahim al-Tikriti, the GID organized the massacres of the villagers of Dujail and Jezan Al Chol, the disappearance of the Barzanis from the Qushtapa camp, and the assassination of 18 members of Ayatollah Mohammed Baqir al-Hakim's family.

As a result of the Gulf War (1991), the department dealing with external affairs was reduced to less than half of its pre-1990 size, while the department dealing with internal affairs was enlarged to deal with increasing anti-Saddam activities within Iraq.

On 13 April 1993, the IIS planned and executed an assassination attempt against former US President George H. W. Bush and the Emir of Kuwait through the use of a large car bomb driven by two Iraqis. However the plan was foiled and Kuwaiti officials arrested 16 persons suspected of carrying out the plot after a car bomb was found. Two Iraqi nationals, during the FBI interviews in Kuwait, admitted to attempting to carry out an attack under direction of the IIS. On 26 June of that year, in response to an attempted assassination by IIS on former US President George H. W. Bush, US President Bill Clinton ordered two U.S. warships, namely USS Peterson and USS Chancellorsville, to fire Tomahawk cruise missiles on the IIS principal command and control complex in Baghdad. 16 of the 23 missiles hit their target; three struck a residential area, killing nine civilians and wounding 12. Four of the missiles were unaccounted for.

In June 1995, Saddam Hussein dismissed his stepbrother Sabawi Ibrahim al-Tikriti from his role as head of the IIS, due to his failure to increase domestic security within Iraq. Brigadier General Ali Hasan al-Majid was named as his successor.

The IIS was officially dissolved on 23 May 2003 by the Administrator of the Coalition Provisional Authority of Iraq, L. Paul Bremer, per CPA Order Number 2.

== Directors ==
- Sadun Shakir Mahmud al-Tikriti (1973–1977)
- Barzan Ibrahim Hassan al-Tikriti (1977–1983)
- Hussein Kamel Hassan al-Majid (1983–1984)
- Fadhil al-Barraq Hussein al-Tikriti (1984–1989)
- Sabawi Ibrahim al-Tikriti (1989–1995)
- Tahir Jalil Habbush (1995–2003)

== See also ==
- Barzan al-Tikriti
- Law enforcement in Iraq
- Directorate of General Security – former internal Iraqi security agency
- Directorate of General Military Intelligence – former Iraqi military intelligence agency
- Iraqi Special Security Organization – former security agency responsible for security of VIPs
- Iraqi National Intelligence Service – successor intelligence agency
