= List of The New York Times number-one books of 2004 =

The American daily newspaper The New York Times publishes multiple weekly lists ranking the best selling books in the United States. The lists are split into three genres—fiction, nonfiction and children's books. Both the fiction and nonfiction lists are further split into multiple lists.

== Fiction ==
The following list ranks the number-one best selling fiction books, in the hardcover fiction category. Dan Brown's The Da Vinci Code, released in the spring of 2003, was the best seller for a second straight year, spending a cumulative 28 weeks at the top.

Date	Book	Author
January 4	The Da Vinci Code	Dan Brown
January 11	The Da Vinci Code	Dan Brown
January 18	The Da Vinci Code	Dan Brown
January 25	The Da Vinci Code	Dan Brown
February 1	The Da Vinci Code	Dan Brown
February 8	The Da Vinci Code	Dan Brown
February 15	The Da Vinci Code	Dan Brown
February 22	The Last Juror	John Grisham
February 29	The Last Juror	John Grisham
March 7	The Last Juror	John Grisham
March 14	The Da Vinci Code	Dan Brown
March 21	3rd Degree	James Patterson and Andrew Gross
March 28	The Da Vinci Code	Dan Brown
April 4	The Da Vinci Code	Dan Brown
April 11	The Da Vinci Code	Dan Brown
April 18	Glorious Appearing	Tim LaHaye and Jerry B. Jenkins
April 25	Glorious Appearing	Tim LaHaye and Jerry B. Jenkins
May 2	Glorious Appearing	Tim LaHaye and Jerry B. Jenkins
May 9	The Da Vinci Code	Dan Brown
May 16	The Da Vinci Code	Dan Brown
May 23	The Da Vinci Code	Dan Brown
May 30	The Da Vinci Code	Dan Brown
June 6	The Da Vinci Code	Dan Brown
June 13	The Da Vinci Code	Dan Brown
June 20	The Da Vinci Code	Dan Brown
June 27	Song of Susannah	Stephen King
July 4	The Da Vinci Code	Dan Brown
July 11	Ten Big Ones	Janet Evanovich
July 18	Sam's Letters to Jennifer	James Patterson
July 25	The Da Vinci Code	Dan Brown
August 1	"R" Is for Ricochet	Sue Grafton
August 8	The Da Vinci Code	Dan Brown
August 15	The Da Vinci Code	Dan Brown
August 22	The Da Vinci Code	Dan Brown
August 29	The Da Vinci Code	Dan Brown
September 5	The Da Vinci Code	Dan Brown
September 12	The Da Vinci Code	Dan Brown
September 19	The Da Vinci Code	Dan Brown
September 26	Trace	Patricia Cornwell
October 3	Trace	Patricia Cornwell
October 10	The Dark Tower	Stephen King
October 17	The Dark Tower	Stephen King
October 24	The Dark Tower	Stephen King
October 31	Northern Lights	Nora Roberts
November 7	Northern Lights	Nora Roberts
November 14	Hour Game	David Baldacci
November 21	Metro Girl	Janet Evanovich
November 28	London Bridges	James Patterson
December 5	The Da Vinci Code	Dan Brown
December 12	Night Fall	Nelson DeMille
December 19	The Five People You Meet in Heaven	Mitch Albom
December 26	The Five People You Meet in Heaven	Mitch Albom

== Nonfiction ==
The following list ranks the number-one best selling nonfiction books, in the hardcover nonfiction category.

Date	Book	Author
January 4	Who's Looking Out for You?	Bill O'Reilly
January 11	Who's Looking Out for You?	Bill O'Reilly
January 18	Lies and the Lying Liars Who Tell Them	Al Franken
January 25	My Prison Without Bars	Pete Rose with Rick Hill
February 1	The Price of Loyalty	Ron Suskind
February 8	The Price of Loyalty	Ron Suskind
February 15	The Price of Loyalty	Ron Suskind
February 22	The Price of Loyalty	Ron Suskind
February 29	The Price of Loyalty	Ron Suskind
March 7	Deliver Us from Evil	Sean Hannity
March 14	Deliver Us from Evil	Sean Hannity
March 21	Deliver Us from Evil	Sean Hannity
March 28	Deliver Us from Evil	Sean Hannity
April 4	Deliver Us from Evil	Sean Hannity
April 11	Against All Enemies	Richard Clarke
April 18	Against All Enemies	Richard Clarke
April 25	Against All Enemies	Richard Clarke
May 2	Against All Enemies	Richard Clarke
May 9	Plan of Attack	Bob Woodward
May 16	Plan of Attack	Bob Woodward
May 23	Plan of Attack	Bob Woodward
May 30	Eats, Shoots & Leaves	Lynne Truss
June 6	Eats, Shoots & Leaves	Lynne Truss
June 13	Eats, Shoots & Leaves	Lynne Truss
June 20	Dress Your Family in Corduroy and Denim	David Sedaris
June 27	Dress Your Family in Corduroy and Denim	David Sedaris
July 4	Big Russ and Me	Tim Russert
July 11	My Life	Bill Clinton
July 18	My Life	Bill Clinton
July 25	My Life	Bill Clinton
August 1	My Life	Bill Clinton
August 8	My Life	Bill Clinton
August 15	My Life	Bill Clinton
August 22	American Soldier	Tommy Franks with Malcolm McConnell
August 29	American Soldier	Tommy Franks with Malcolm McConnell
September 5	Unfit for Command	John O'Neill with Jerome Corsi
September 12	Unfit for Command	John O'Neill with Jerome Corsi
September 19	Unfit for Command	John O'Neill with Jerome Corsi
September 26	Unfit for Command	John O'Neill with Jerome Corsi
October 3	The Family	Kitty Kelley
October 10	America: The Book	Jon Stewart and The Daily Show writers
October 17	America: The Book	Jon Stewart and The Daily Show writers
October 24	America: The Book	Jon Stewart and The Daily Show writers
October 31	America: The Book	Jon Stewart and The Daily Show writers
November 7	America: The Book	Jon Stewart and The Daily Show writers
November 14	America: The Book	Jon Stewart and The Daily Show writers
November 21	America: The Book	Jon Stewart and The Daily Show writers
November 28	America: The Book	Jon Stewart and The Daily Show writers
December 5	America: The Book	Jon Stewart and The Daily Show writers
December 12	America: The Book	Jon Stewart and The Daily Show writers
December 19	America: The Book	Jon Stewart and The Daily Show writers
December 26	America: The Book	Jon Stewart and The Daily Show writers

== See also ==
- Publishers Weekly list of bestselling novels in the United States in the 2000s
