= Ballou High School =

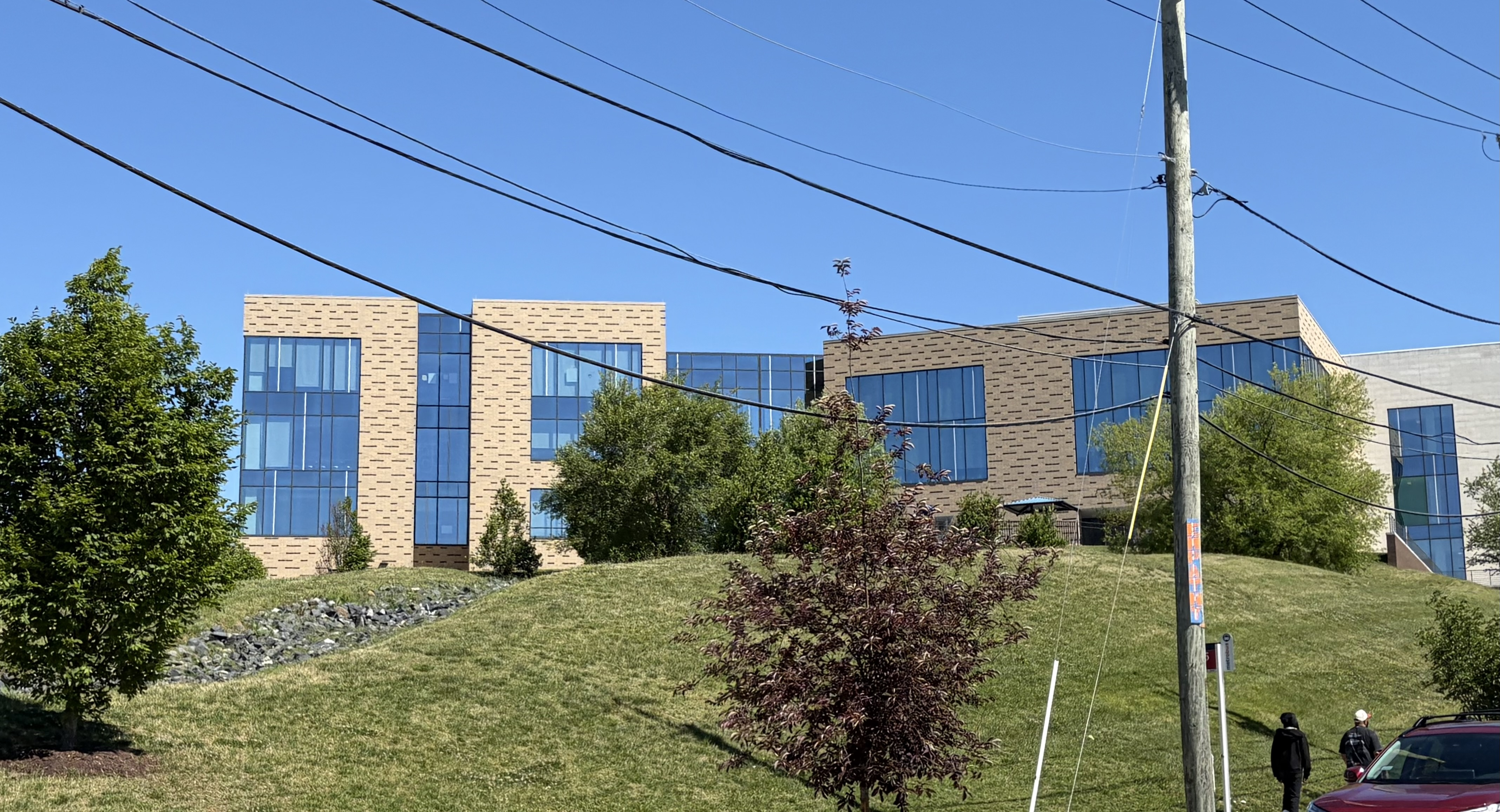
- Ballou High School from Mississippi Avenue

Location
- 3401 Fourth Street SE; Ward 8 Washington, D.C. 20032; United States; 38°50′25″N 77°0′5″W

Information
- Other name: Ballou Senior High School
- School type: Public high school
- Established: 1960 (66 years ago)
- Status: Open
- School board: District of Columbia State Board of Education
- School district: District of Columbia Public Schools
- NCES District ID: 1100030
- School code: DC-001-452
- CEEB code: 090078
- NCES School ID: 110003000084
- Principal: William Haith
- Faculty: 63.00 (on an FTE basis)
- Grades: 9–12
- Gender: Coeducational
- Enrollment: 657 (2022–2023)
  - Grade 9: 316
  - Grade 10: 156
  - Grade 11: 108
  - Grade 12: 77
- Student to teacher ratio: 10.43
- Area: 350,000 square feet (33,000 m^{2})
- Campus type: Urban
- Colors: Blue and gold
- Nickname: Knights
- USNWR ranking: 13,394–17,857
- Website: www.balloudc.org

Frank W. Ballou Senior High School is a public school located in Washington, D.C., United States. Ballou is a part of the District of Columbia Public Schools.

== History ==
Ballou High School was founded in the early 1960s to serve residents in the Southeast part of Washington, DC to include Congress Heights, Washington Highlands, and Bellevue. The school was named after Frank Washington Ballou, the D.C. public schools superintendent from 1920 to 1943.

In 1998, author Ron Suskind published the book "A Hope in the Unseen" about a Ballou High School student named Cedric Jennings. The book was based on a series of Pulitzer-prize winning articles written in The Wall Street Journal by Suskind. The story follows Jennings's efforts to attend an Ivy League university despite his troubled upbringing.

In 2003, mercury spread throughout the school, causing its closure for several weeks and the redirection of students and staff to nearby educational facilities.

On February 2, 2004, 19-year-old Thomas J. Boykin fatally shot 17-year-old James Richardson. Boykin was later acquitted on the charge of murder.

NBC4 News reported another shooting on August 26, 2008, of a 16-year-old just off the campus grounds resulting in a lock-down of the campus.

In 2008, director Michael Patrei, released a documentary Ballou about the Ballou High School Marching Band that aired on BET. during Fall 2009.

From August 2016 to May 2017 about 25% of the staff left the school; this occurred as almost 200 DCPS teachers left their jobs.

=== Controversy ===
In February 1977, six employees from the Central Intelligence Agency (CIA) began tutoring Ballou students in computer technology, photogrammetry, and photo science. Parents, teachers, and lawmakers expressed concerns about privacy and student recruitment after learning of the program months after it had already begun. The CIA denied that they were recruiting or violating privacy within the school.

== Admissions ==
Joint Base Anacostia-Bolling is within Ballou's attendance boundary.

The following elementary schools feed into Ballou: Garfield, Hendley, M. L. King, Leckie, Malcolm X, Patterson, Simon, and Turner.

The following middle schools feed into Ballou: Charles Hart Middle School and John Hayden Johnson Middle School.

=== Demographics ===
View source data.

Enrollment by Race/Ethnicity 2020–2021
Black	Hispanic	American Indian/Alaska Native
645	18	1

== Curriculum ==
In 2016, only three percent of Ballou HS students had proficiency in D.C. reading standards according to D.C. tests.

In 2017, all 189 students in Ballou High School's senior class applied to college. It was the first time the high school's entire senior class had applied to college. The high school credited its college-prep classes and a school-wide campaign to apply to college. As of the summer of 2017, all 170 members of the graduating class of 2017 were accepted to universities; an additional 20 students had August graduations scheduled. In November 2017, it came to light that Ballou's administration had graduated dozens of students despite high rates of unexcused absences. Half of the graduates missed more than three months of school in their senior year, unexcused; one in five students were absent more than they were present, and when many of these students did attend school, they struggled academically. Two months before graduation, only 57 students were on track to graduate. Brian Butcher, a history teacher at Ballou, said the claim of all students graduating was "smoke and mirrors. That is what it was."

=== School of Mathematics, Science and Technology ===
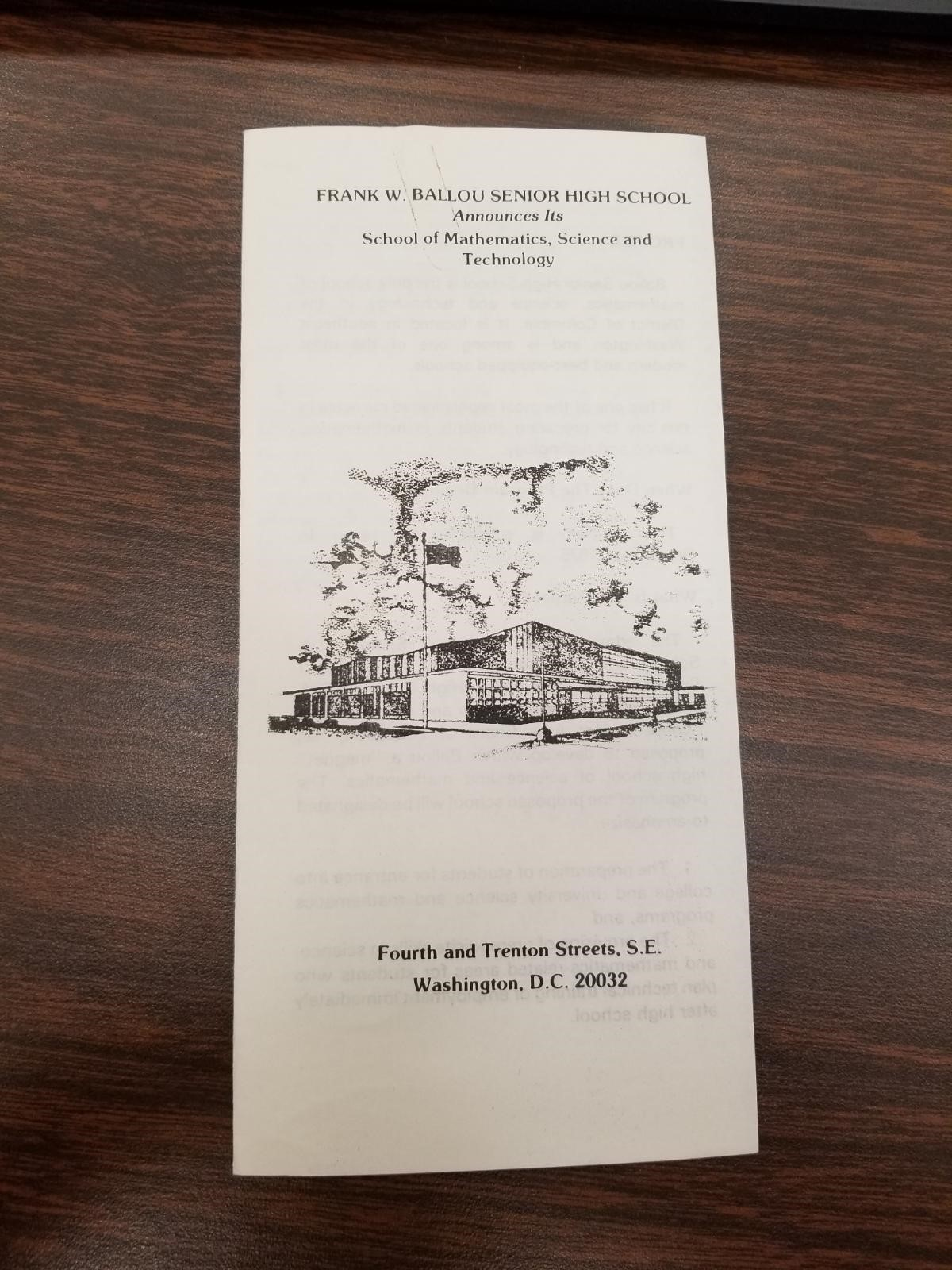
Ballou SHS Announcement Math-Science Program in 1975

In September 1975, Ballou SHS opened their School of Mathematics, Science and Technology. At that time, the program was considered one of the most sophisticated curricula in the city. One intention was to develop within Ballou a "Magnet" High School of Science and Mathematics to emphasize:

- The preparation of students for entrance into Colleges and Universities
- The provision of prerequisite skills for students who planned technical training or employment immediately after high school.

== Extracurricular activities ==
Ballou SHS is known for having one of the best choirs and bands in the District. The Ballou SHS band has traveled to California and Alabama and placed in the top three in both national competitions. The Ballou SHS band is directed by Mr. Darrell Watson. and his all-volunteer Ballou alumni staff. Ballou has produced several DCIAA City Champions and many NCAA Scholarship Athletes.

The marching band traveled to the 2009 Tournament of Roses Parade in Pasadena, California and the 2009 Macy's Thanksgiving Day Parade.

== Notable alumni ==
- Marvin Austin (2007), college football defensive tackle at UNC Chapel Hill, taken by the New York Giants in the 2nd round of the 2011 NFL draft.
- Michael Fanone, police officer
- Wayne Ford (1969), Iowa State Representative
- Danny Gatton, one of Rolling Stone magazine's top guitarists of all time, attended but did not graduate. Named album 88 Elmira Street after Congress Heights street where he grew up.
- Benny Anthony Harley (1981), trumpet player in go-go band Rare Essence
- Essex Hemphill (1975), poet and activist, known for his activism in the African American and LGBT communities.
- Earthquake, radio personality and comedian.
- Mike Locksley (1987), in 2018 he was named head football coach of the University of Maryland, he was previously head football coach at the University of New Mexico and Offensive Coordinator of University of Alabama football program
- Duane A. Moody (1988), tenor artist, member of the trio Three Mo' Tenors
- Larry Pinkard (2010), played college football for Old Dominion University, and in the National Football League for multiple teams since 2015.
- Trayon White (2002), community activist and former member of the District of Columbia State Board of Education and Ward 8 Representative on the Council of the District of Columbia.
