= Confidence Men =

2011 book by Ron Suskind

Confidence Men: Wall Street, Washington, and the Education of a President
- First edition of HarperCollins, 2011
- Author: Ron Suskind
- Language: English
- Subject: Politics
- Publisher: Harper
- Publication date: September 20, 2011
- Publication place: United States
- Pages: 528
- ISBN: 978-0-06-142925-5

Confidence Men: Wall Street, Washington and the Education of a President is a book by journalist Ron Suskind, published by HarperCollins on September 20, 2011.

It details members of the White House during the Obama administration, as well as interactions between figures such as economic advisor Lawrence Summers, Treasury secretary Timothy F. Geithner, former chief of staff Rahm Emanuel, and budget director Peter R. Orszag.

== Content ==
Having obtained an advance copy of the book, The New York Times published a review on September 15, 2011, writing that it "offers a portrait of a White House operating under intense pressure as it dealt with a cascade of crises, from insolvent banks to collapsing carmakers. And it details the rivalries among figures around the president," including economic advisor Lawrence Summers; Treasury secretary Timothy F. Geithner; former chief of staff Rahm Emanuel; and budget director Peter R. Orszag."

The following day, The Washington Post elaborated on the content of the book, citing the allegation that Treasury Secretary Timothy Geithner ignored a directive from the president to draw up plans for restructuring Citibank in the spring of 2009. The article also notes that in an interview in the book, Geithner denies the account saying "I don't slow-walk the president on anything". The White House pushed back against the book in spite of having granted Ron Suskind an interview with the president, with communications director Dan Pfeiffer saying that books like these "tend to take the normal day-to-day activities of governing and infuse them with drama, palace intrigue and salacious details".

While some faulted Suskind for giving greater credence to the views of sources who gave him more journalistic access others praised him for doing the opposite. In his review for The New York Times, Joe Nocera wrote "to his everlasting credit, Suskind savages several people he clearly spent time interviewing, starting with Obama's former chief economic adviser, Larry Summers, and Timothy Geithner, his Treasury secretary. And he's more than willing to step outside his re-created scenes to conduct interviews, in which Obama aides and allies tell truths that are genuinely painful to hear."

According to the book President Obama supported a financial transaction tax on trades of stocks, derivatives, and other financial instruments, but he was blocked by Summers.

== Release and reception ==
Confidence Men was released on September 20, 2011. In his first television appearance, on the Today Show, Suskind was interviewed by anchor Ann Curry who cited the White House pushback in her questioning, with Suskind maintaining that the book represented an accurate depiction of what he had found in his reporting. Hendrik Hertzberg wrote in his review of the book for The New Yorker that the book would offer "support for some of today's standard progressive gripes about the President" being stymied by his conservative, Wall Street-attentive advisers, "and for a few of the conservative ones," namely assertions that Obama arrived in office unprepared to lead. In his review of the book for The New York Times, Joe Nocera noted that the book had "an omniscient quality" of fly-on-the-wall scenes from inside the White House, much like the books of Bob Woodward, but "doesn't really go for phony omniscience" where the sources who are most cooperative are rendered most favorably. In a New Republic review, John B. Judis wrote, "Suskind's book is being widely portrayed as critical of the Obama administration, but if you read the entire book, its message is that during Obama's first two years he was foiled by his own inexperience as a manager and by a staff that didn't do good by him, but that after the Democratic defeat in 2010 he learned from his failure."

Both Summers and Geithner, who offered extensive responses to key disclosures in the book's pages, pushed back hard against their characterizations after publication.

A week after publication, the book debuted at #2 on The New York Times Bestseller list for Nonfiction.
