= Paul H. O'Neill =

American politician and businessman (1935–2020)

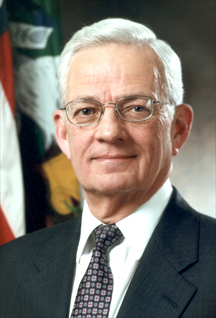
- Official portrait, 2001

72nd United States Secretary of the Treasury
- In office January 20, 2001 – December 31, 2002
- President: George W. Bush
- Deputy: Kenneth W. Dam
- Preceded by: Lawrence Summers
- Succeeded by: John W. Snow

Deputy Director of the Office of Management and Budget
- In office 1974–1977
- President: Gerald Ford

Personal details
- Born: Paul Henry O'Neill; December 4, 1935 St. Louis, Missouri, U.S.
- Died: April 18, 2020 (aged 84) Pittsburgh, Pennsylvania, U.S.
- Party: Republican
- Spouse: Nancy Jo O'Neill (née Wolfe)
- Children: 4
- Education: California State University, Fresno (BA); Indiana University Bloomington (MPA)
- Paul H. O'Neill's voice O'Neill testifies on U.S. contributions to international programs at a Senate Appropriations subcommittee hearing Recorded March 19, 2002

Paul Henry O'Neill (December 4, 1935 – April 18, 2020) was an American businessman and government official who served as the 72nd United States secretary of the treasury for part of President George W. Bush's first term, from January 2001 until his resignation in December 2002. Prior to his term as Secretary, O'Neill was chairman and CEO of industrial giant Alcoa and chairman of the RAND Corporation.

== Early life and education ==
O'Neill was born in St. Louis, Missouri, the son of Gaynald Elsie (née Irvin) and John Paul O'Neill, an army sergeant. His father claimed that he was from Scotland and that he did not know where his family was anymore. A long time after his death, however, Paul discovered that he was actually from the Netherlands and was originally named Piet Kalfsterman; it is not known why his father lied to his family about his background.

Due to his father's transfers, the family had to change residences often. They lived in Illinois, Hawaii, New Mexico and Alaska. As a teenager, Paul worked part-time jobs including as a paperboy and as a clerk at a convenience store. He graduated from Anchorage High School in Anchorage, Alaska in 1954. While in Alaska, he lived with his parents on Fort Richardson, a military base in Anchorage. He received a Bachelor of Arts degree in economics from California State University, Fresno, studied economics at Claremont Graduate University in 1961, and received a Master of Public Administration from Indiana University Bloomington, from a school renamed in his honor, the Paul H. O'Neill School of Public and Environmental Affairs.

== Career ==
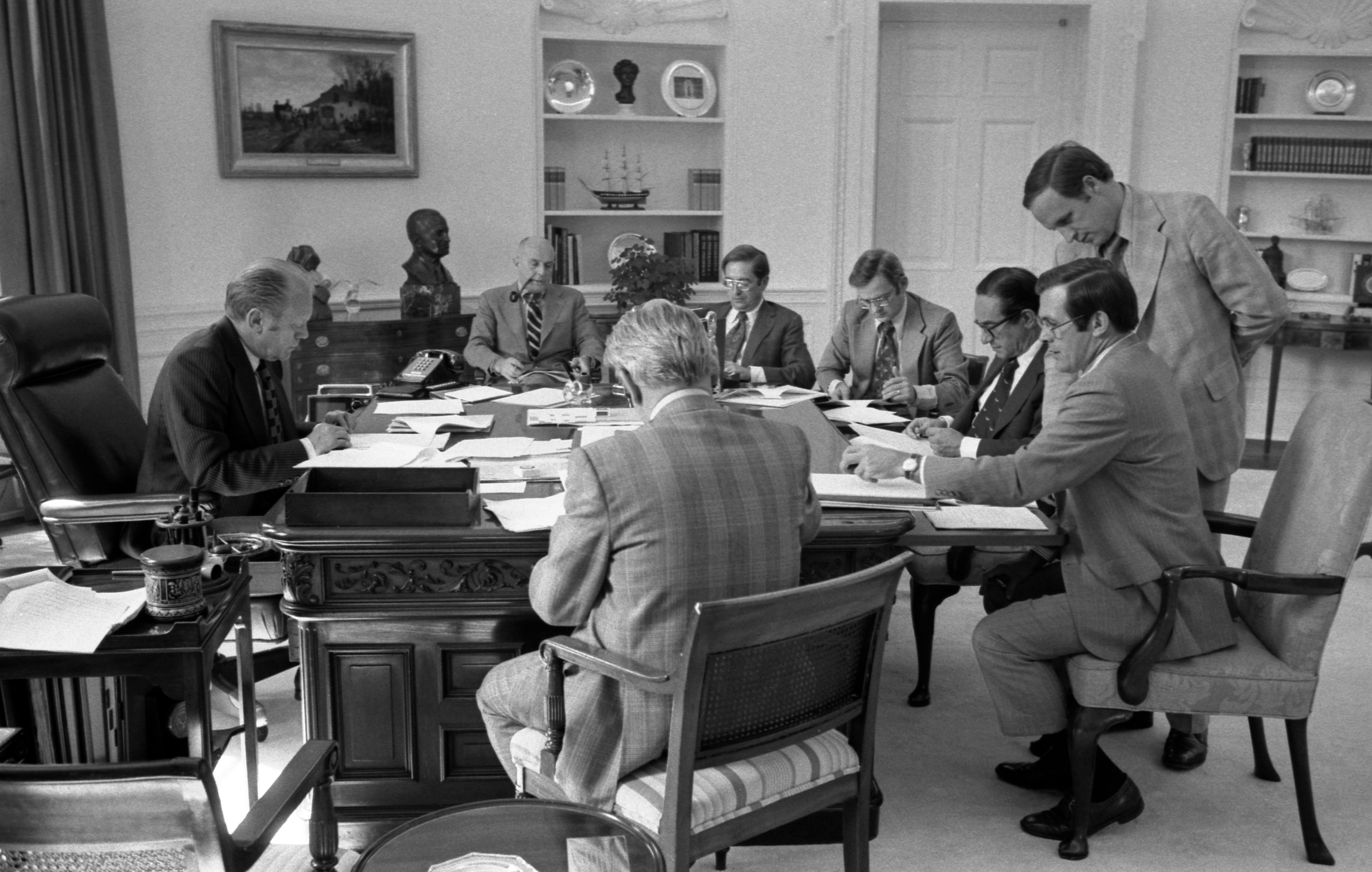
President Gerald Ford and staff review a draft of his address to the Nation on recommendations for tax reduction and spending, to be delivered that evening. Clockwise: President Ford, Economic Affairs Assistant L. William Seidman, OMB Director James Thomas Lynn, OMB Deputy Director Paul H. O'Neill, Council of Economic Advisers (CEA) Chairman Alan Greenspan, Deputy Assistant to the President for White House Operations Dick Cheney, Assistant to the President for White House Operations Don Rumsfeld, Assistant Secretary of the Treasury for Tax Policy Charles M. Walker.

O'Neill began his public service as a computer systems analyst with the United States Department of Veterans Affairs, where he served from 1961 to 1966. He joined the United States Office of Management and Budget in 1967 and served as its deputy director from 1974 to 1977.

O'Neill along with Kenneth W. Dam and William A. Morrill resisted President Richard Nixon in 1973 when he tried cutting off federal funding to the Massachusetts Institute of Technology in retaliation for it allowing anti-war protests over the Vietnam War. The three threatened to resign and reminded Nixon that the executive office could not rescind the federal grants, forcing him to back down. According to Frank Zarb, he, O'Neill, Roy Ash and Fred Malek mostly ran the government in 1974 as Nixon's authority was eroded with the Watergate scandal.

=== Private sector ===
After President Gerald Ford lost the 1976 election, O'Neill took an executive job at International Paper in New York City. He was vice president of the company from 1977 to 1985 and president from 1985 to 1987.

O'Neill was chairman and CEO of the Pittsburgh industrial giant Alcoa from 1987 to 1999 and retired as chairman at the end of 2000. At the beginning of his tenure O'Neill encountered significant resistance from the Board of Directors due to his stance on prioritizing worker safety. One argued reason that he could remain in office was his level of CEO power. The company's market value increased from $3 billion in 1986 to $27.53 billion in 2000, while net income increased from $200 million to $1.484 billion.

In 1988, O'Neill joined the RAND Corporation as a member of its board of trustees and in 1997 was elected as its chairperson. He resigned after being appointed as the treasury secretary, but was appointed to RAND's board of trustees again in 2003 after losing his job. He also served on RAND Health's advisory board.

After being dismissed as Treasury Secretary, he became a special advisor for The Blackstone Group. In addition he also acted as an angel investor with his son Paul Jr. for Qcept Technologies Inc. in 2004, and joined it as a board director. In 2005, he established a consulting firm named Value Capture that advises health care institutions on reducing expenses as well as increasing safety of patients.

=== Community service ===
In 1989, he was approached by George H. W. Bush to serve as Secretary of Defense. O'Neill declined but recommended Dick Cheney for the position instead. Bush then pursued and convinced O'Neill to chair an advisory group on education that included Lamar Alexander, Bill Brock, and Richard Riley.

In December 1997, O'Neill together with Karen Wolk Feinstein, President of the Jewish Healthcare Foundation, founded the Pittsburgh Regional Health Initiative (PRHI). They assembled a wide-ranging coalition of healthcare interests to begin addressing the problems of healthcare as a region. PRHI adapted the principles of the Toyota Production System into the "Perfecting Patient Care" system. O'Neill became a leader locally and nationally in addressing issues of patient safety and quality in healthcare.

O'Neill was a co-founder of Pittsburgh's Riverlife Task Force, established in 1999. He served on its very first task force with Jim Rohr, Teresa Heinz, the CEO of Richard King Mellon Foundation Mike Watson, the President of the Heinz Endowments Mark King and the editor of the Pittsburgh Post-Gazette John G. Craig Jr. among others.

O'Neill was also a member of the Dean's Advisory Council of Carnegie Mellon University's Heinz College. In addition, he served on the board of directors of the Committee for a Responsible Federal Budget.

In 2006, he published the results of a study conducted from 2003 to 2005 at Allegheny General Hospital along with a team of doctors led by Richard Shannon, in the Joint Commission Journal on Quality and Patient Safety. It showed reduction in infections through a team coordinating to prevent infections in the bloodstream. He also rejoined PRHI as its CEO in October 2003. O'Neill became a trustee of the University of Pittsburgh Medical Center in February 2003, but left in September 2004 due to it not joining a programme to make hospitals eliminate medical errors. During his tenure he often disagreed with UPMC's CEO Jeffrey Romoff and also opposed its plans to shut Highmark-insured patients out of receiving treatment at affiliated hospitals in 2019.

In June 2019, he was awarded the Gerald R. Ford Medal for Distinguished Public Service by the Gerald R. Ford Presidential Foundation.

=== Bush administration ===
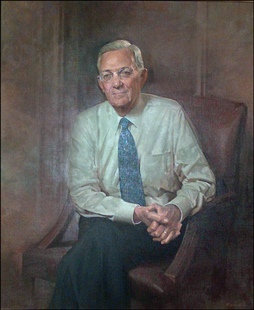
Official portrait as Secretary of the Treasury

O'Neill was appointed as the Secretary of the Treasury by the newly elected president George W. Bush in January 2001. He believed in fiscal prudence, increasing productivity and also encouraging workers with safeguards for their jobs. As the secretary he strongly disagreed with the strong dollar policy, ceremonial speeches and large bailouts, while favoring personally touring American factories and reducing the length of written statements by the finance ministers belonging to the Group of Seven. O'Neill saw the United States through the 2001 recession and 9/11 attacks. He initially helped pass the first tax cuts under the Bush administration but stringently opposed the second. He also clashed with Bush on his steel tariffs as well as actions against Cuba.

O'Neill also helped Turkey, Argentina and Brazil in receiving loans from the International Monetary Fund but opposed more financial assistance. His cavalcade was once attacked with eggs during a visit to Argentina because of his stating the country had “no industry to speak of.” He however also encouraged governments to increase grants by the World Bank and cracking down on monetary support of terrorism. In this regard, he encouraged governments to further regulate non-traditional lending systems such as hawala, and was a strong proponent of integrating largely non-participatory governments, organizations, and individuals into more formal financial institutions. In May 2002, he visited Africa with Bono to draw attention to the continent's poor. During his tenure, he was known for his outspokenness which would eventually cost him his job in December 2002.

Ron Suskind interviewed O'Neill extensively about his tenure in the Bush administration. He was also given access to a large amount of documentation. In 2004 he authored the book The Price of Loyalty, detailing O'Neill's tenure in the Bush administration. The book describes many of the conflicts that O'Neill had with the Bush administration. It also details his criticisms of some of Bush's economic policies. O'Neill claims that Bush appeared somewhat unquestioning and incurious, and that the Iraq War was planned from the first National Security Council meeting, soon after the administration took office. At the first cabinet meeting of the new Bush administration, O'Neill observed that the debate was not "should we attack Iraq?" but rather "how do we go about attacking Iraq?"

== Personal life ==
O'Neill's siblings included two brothers and a sister. He married Nancy Jo Wolfe, whom he had met while studying at Anchorage High School. He fathered four children including three daughters named Patricia, Margaret, Julie and a son named Paul Jr.

=== Death ===
O'Neill died at his home in Pittsburgh on April 18, 2020, aged 84, from lung cancer. He is survived by a sister, a brother, his four children, twelve grandchildren and fifteen great-grandchildren.

=== Comments and views ===
In an October 16, 2007, opinion piece published in The New York Times, he wrote of the reluctance among politicians to address comprehensive reform in the U.S. health care system. In the opinion, he suggested that doctors and hospitals should be required to report medical errors within 24 hours, as well as moving malpractice suits out of the civil courts and into a new, independent body. He also felt that health care reform had to acknowledge all aspects of the problem, such as insurance coverage, medical costs, quality of care, and information technology.

In April 2016, he was one of eight former Treasury secretaries who called on the United Kingdom to remain a member of the European Union ahead of the June 2016 Referendum.

Political offices
Preceded by Lawrence Summers	United States Secretary of the Treasury; 2001–2002	Succeeded by John W. Snow
