= Marvin Austin =

American football player (born 1989)

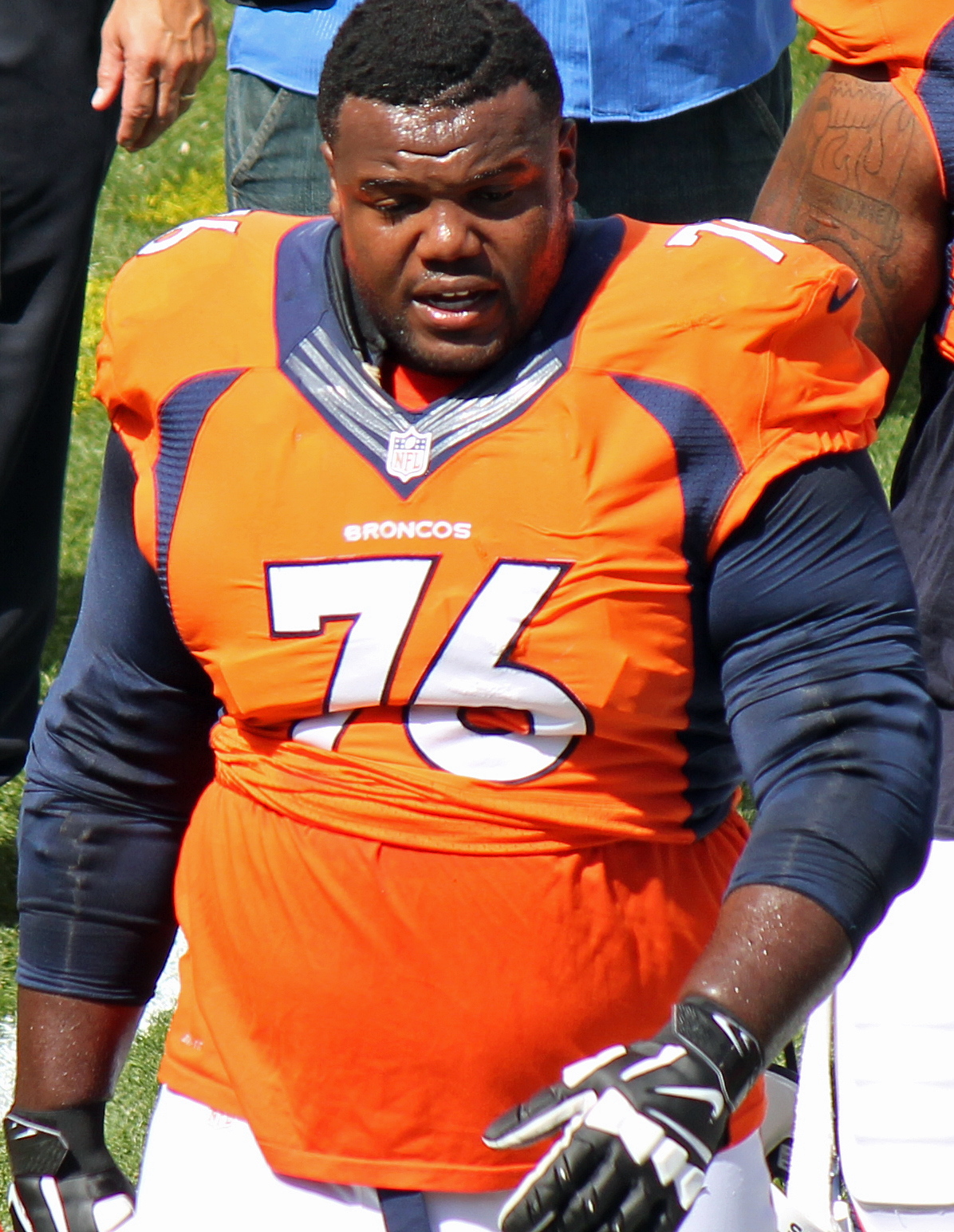
- Austin with the Denver Broncos in 2014

No. 96, 90, 58, 76
- Position: Defensive tackle

Personal information
- Born: January 1, 1989 (age 37); Washington, D.C., U.S.
- Listed height: 6 ft 2 in (1.88 m)
- Listed weight: 312 lb (142 kg)

Career information
- High school: Ballou (Washington, D.C.)
- College: North Carolina
- NFL draft: 2011: 2nd round, 52nd overall pick

Career history
- New York Giants (2011–2012); Miami Dolphins (2013); Dallas Cowboys (2013); Denver Broncos (2014–2015)

Awards and highlights
- Freshman All-American (2007); Second-team All-ACC (2009); All-ACC Freshman (2007)

Career NFL statistics
- Total tackles: 22
- Stats at Pro Football Reference

Marvin Austin Jr. (born January 1, 1989) is an American former professional football player who was a nose tackle in the National Football League (NFL). He played college football for the North Carolina Tar Heels and was selected by the New York Giants in the second round of the 2011 NFL draft. Austin also played for the Miami Dolphins, Dallas Cowboys and Denver Broncos.

== Early life ==
A native of Washington, D.C., Austin chose to attend Coolidge High School in the Manor Park neighborhood, despite being courted by notable D.C. area athletic programs like DeMatha coming out of middle school. As a junior in 2005, he helped Coolidge to the D.C. Interscholastic Athletic Association title game for the first time since 1986, where they lost 43–14 to a Dunbar team that was led by Arrelious Benn, Nate Bussey, and Vontae Davis. In the spring of 2006, Coolidge assistant Moses Ware was hired as the head coach at his alma mater Ballou High School in Congress Heights, and persuaded a number of rising seniors—including Austin—to leave Coolidge and play for him across town. He led Ballou to their first DCIAA title in 2006, beating Dunbar 34–33. Austin contributed 85 tackles and 17 sacks, and was named High School All-Metro First-team by Washington Post for consecutive times (2005 and 2006). Following his high school career, Austin played in the 2007 U.S. Army All-American Bowl. USA Today named him to their All-American first-team, and also National Defensive Player of the Year.

Regarded as a five-star recruit by Rivals.com, Austin was ranked as the No. 1 defensive tackle in the class of 2007, which also included Brian Price, Drake Nevis, and Star Lotulelei. Austin was ranked third overall in the country in Scout.com's final rankings, behind only Everson Griffen and Joe McKnight. He was recruited by numerous top programs around the country including Florida State, Southern California, and Tennessee. On National Signing Day 2007, Austin committed to play his collegiate ball at the North Carolina.

== College career ==
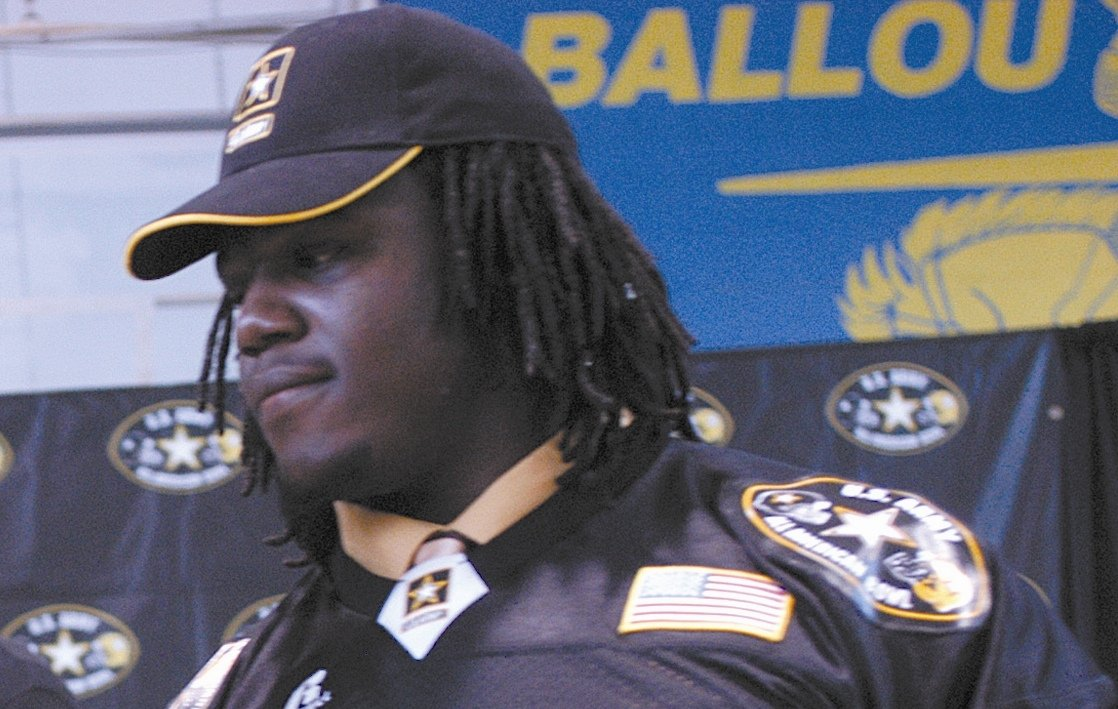
Austin receiving his nomination for the 2007 U.S. Army All-American Bowl in September 2006.

In his true freshman year at North Carolina, Austin played in all 12 season games and started in three. He finished the season with 26 tackles, 6.0 tackles for losses, and 4.0 sacks.

In 2008, Austin played in 13 games and started 11. He tied with E.J. Wilson for most tackles by a Carolina defensive lineman with 38, had 1.5 tackles for loss, 1 sack, 1 interception (returned for touchdown), and 1 blocked kick. He had three tackles, assisted on a tackle for loss and had one quarterback pressure in the win over Notre Dame, and earned coaches "player of the game" honors for his performance.

In his junior season, Austin was selected second-team All-ACC. For the season, Austin finished with 42 tackles, 6.0 tackles for losses, four sacks, three pass breakups, six quarterback pressures, one forced fumble and a fumble recovery.

After an excellent junior season, Austin was viewed as a potential top-10 draft pick. However, before he could build on his draft stock, he was suspended along with 13 other North Carolina players for receiving improper benefits. Austin along with Tar Heels pass rusher Robert Quinn, receiver Greg Little and three others were suspended the entire 2010 season. North Carolina still had enough talent to finish 8-5 and beat Tennessee in the Music City Bowl.

Even though he was dismissed from the UNC football team, Austin represented the school in the 2011 East-West Shrine Game on January 22, 2011. He scored a touchdown by recovering a fumble by Texas A&M Aggies' starting quarterback Jerrod Johnson 3 yards out of the endzone.

Austin came under heavy fire in the NFL draft process. Despite having a good East-West Shrine game, his character and judgment came under question to scouts. Reports of his skipping the Wonderlic test and finger-pointing in interviews reportedly disappointed some NFL personnel.

On November 19, 2013, the University of North Carolina sent a disassociation letter to Austin, Greg Little, and Robert Quinn for the improper benefits taken during their time at the university. The three athletes are prohibited from contacting current North Carolina athletes and are not allowed inside the Kenan Football Center or other athletic facilities on campus.

== Professional career ==
Pre-draft measurables
Height	Weight	Arm length	Hand span	Wingspan	40-yard dash	10-yard split	20-yard split	20-yard shuttle	Three-cone drill	Vertical jump	Broad jump	Bench press
6 ft 1 5/8 in (1.87 m)	309 lb (140 kg)	32 5/8 in (0.83 m)	10 1/4 in (0.26 m)	6 ft 6 5/8 in (2.00 m)	4.85 s	1.73 s	2.81 s	4.40 s	7.33 s	30.5 in (0.77 m)	9 ft 4 in (2.84 m)	38 reps
All values from NFL Combine

=== New York Giants ===
In the 2011 NFL draft Austin was selected 52nd overall by the New York Giants. Giants general manager Jerry Reese stated he consulted Austin's teammate at UNC Hakeem Nicks prior to the selection. Austin said Nicks was the first person to call him after he was selected. Prior to the draft Austin was heavily scouted by the Chicago Bears. Bears coach Lovie Smith and defensive coordinator Rod Marinelli visited Austin and "spent a goodly amount of time with him".

On August 22, Austin's season was cut short as he tore his pectoral muscle during a preseason game against the Bears. He was placed on injured reserve on August 30.

On August 24, 2013, Austin sacked Jets quarterback Mark Sanchez in the 4th quarter of a pre-season game, which effectively ended Sanchez's Jets career.

Austin saw his first appearance come in the Giants' second game of the 2012 NFL season, when the Giants played the Tampa Bay Buccaneers.

=== Miami Dolphins ===
He was signed to the Miami Dolphins' roster on September 24, 2013. He was released on October 15, 2013.

=== Dallas Cowboys ===
On October 21, 2013, he was signed by the Dallas Cowboys. He made his Cowboys debut in the 30–31 loss to the Detroit Lions in week 8, registering one tackle. Due to a back injury suffered during practice, Austin missed the Cowboys' next game against the Minnesota Vikings, and was cut two days later, on November 5, 2013.

=== Denver Broncos ===
Austin signed with the Denver Broncos on May 5, 2014.
