= Larry Pinkard =

American football player (born 1992)

Profile
- Position: Wide receiver

Personal information
- Born: February 25, 1992 (age 34); Washington, D.C., U.S.
- Listed height: 6 ft 0 in (1.83 m)
- Listed weight: 196 lb (89 kg)

Career information
- High school: Ballou (Washington, D.C.)
- College: Old Dominion
- NFL draft: 2015: undrafted

Career history
- Green Bay Packers (2015)*; Oakland Raiders (2015)*; Jacksonville Jaguars (2017); Cleveland Browns (2018)*
- * Offseason or practice squad member only

Career NFL statistics
- Receptions: 1
- Receiving yards: 5
- Stats at Pro Football Reference

Larry Pinkard (born February 25, 1992) is an American former professional football player who was a wide receiver in the National Football League (NFL). He played college football for the Old Dominion Monarchs. He was originally signed as an undrafted free agent by the Green Bay Packers. He was also a member of the Oakland Raiders, Jacksonville Jaguars, and Cleveland Browns.

== Professional career ==
=== Green Bay Packers ===
Pinkard was signed by the Green Bay Packers as an undrafted free agent on May 8, 2015. He was waived/injured on September 5, 2015 and placed on injured reserve. He was released on September 14, 2015.

=== Oakland Raiders ===
On December 15, 2015, Pinkard was signed to the Oakland Raiders' practice squad.

=== Jacksonville Jaguars ===
On April 17, 2017, Pinkard was signed by the Jacksonville Jaguars. He was waived on September 1, 2017. He was signed to the practice squad on September 12, 2017. He was promoted to the active roster on November 18, 2017. He was waived/injured on December 23, 2017 and was placed on injured reserve. On February 23, 2018, he was waived by the Jaguars.

=== Cleveland Browns ===
On February 26, 2018, Pinkard was claimed off waivers by the Cleveland Browns. He was waived by the Browns less than two months later, on April 12.

== Personal life ==
His parents are Larry Green and Michele Pinkard-Green. He has four siblings, two sisters, Lashelle and LaTonya, and two brothers, Jacqua and Ayinde. He majored in sports management.
