= A Hope in the Unseen =

1998 book by Ron Suskind

- Author: Ron Suskind
- Language: English
- Genre: Biographical novel
- Publisher: Broadway Books
- Publication date: June 1998
- Publication place: United States
- Media type: Print (hardback & paperback)
- Pages: 384 pp (first edition, hardback)
- ISBN: 978-0-7679-0125-3 (first edition, hardback)
- OCLC: 38258356
- Dewey Decimal: 371.8/092 B 21
- LC Class: LC2803.W3 S87 1998

A Hope in the Unseen (Full Title "A Hope in the Unseen: An American Odyssey from the Inner City to the Ivy League") is the first book by author and journalist Ron Suskind, published in 1998. The book is a biographical novel about the life of Cedric Jennings through his last years in high school and first years in college. It details his life in Ballou High School, an inner city school in Washington, D.C., and onto Brown University, which Cedric attends after high school. The book portrays the problems of inner-city education systems and how the students from these systems are affected throughout their lives. In 2008, the book was selected as part of the "One Maryland, One Book" program.

== Plot ==
Cedric Jennings is an anomaly at Ballou High School in the Southeast neighborhood of Washington, D.C.: in a poorly performing school where academic achievement is scorned, Cedric proudly strives for high grades with a desire to attend a top university. The sub-par standards at Ballou place him at a distinct disadvantage academically, while frequent taunts and physical threats from other students have alienated him socially. Cedric lives with his mother, Barbara Jennings, who works for the Department of Agriculture; his father Cedric Gilliam is a drug dealer currently in jail.

In his junior year, Cedric is admitted to the Minority Introduction to Engineering and Science (MITES) summer program at the Massachusetts Institute of Technology. He believes this is the start of a new life for him, but when summer arrives he finds the classes much more difficult than his fellow MITES students who attended better schools and were better versed in math and science. Although he makes friends at MIT, he also sees that his ghetto background sets him apart from them. At the end of the program, Cedric is told by faculty director Leon Trilling that he would not be welcome in MIT as a college student.

== Synopsis ==
At Ballou Senior High, a school besieged by violence in Washington, D.C., honor students have learned to keep their heads down. Like most inner-city kids, they know that any special attention in a place this dangerous can make you a target of violence. But Cedric Jennings will not swallow his pride, and with unwavering support from his mother, he studies and strives as if his life depends on it—and it does. The summer after his junior year, at a program for minorities at MIT, he gets a fleeting glimpse of life outside, a glimpse that turns into a face-on challenge one year later: acceptance into Brown University, an Ivy League school. At Brown, finding himself far behind most of the other freshmen, Cedric must manage a bewildering array of intellectual and social challenges. Cedric had hoped that at college he would finally find a place to fit in, but he discovers he has little in common with either the white students, many of whom come from privileged backgrounds, or the middle-class blacks. Having traveled too far to turn back, Cedric is left to rely on his faith, his intelligence, and his determination to keep alive his hope in the unseen—a future of acceptance and reward that he struggles, each day, to envision.

== Critical Response and Reaction ==
The book was met with overwhelming critical and commercial success. It was chosen by the New York Times, Chicago Tribune, Washington Monthly and Booklist as one of the best books of the year. The New York Times Book Review called it “An extraordinary, formula-shattering book”. David Halberstam called it "A beautiful book of a heroic American struggle." The book has been a regular selection in college courses on American culture, education, sociology and creative writing, and has been a required reading for incoming freshmen at many universities. In 2008, the book was selected as part of the “One Maryland, One Book” program.

The book was especially noted for its influence on the debate over affirmative action. Upon its release in 1998, affirmative action had become one of the preeminent domestic social issues facing the country. In their review of the book, CNN declared "As more voters, politicos and talk-show hosts write off affirmative action as a well-intentioned anachronism, "A Hope in the Unseen" should be required reading for would-be opinion-mongers." In his review for Newsday, Bill Reel stated "I changed my thinking about affirmative action. I was against it, now I am for it. The agent of change was a mind-opening book - "A Hope in the Unseen" by Ron Suskind."

The book also drew high praise for its innovations to writing style - using exhaustive reporting to place readers inside the heads of characters. The Chicago Tribune called the book, "the new, new nonfiction."

On March 25, 2009, All Things Considered ran a segment about A Hope in the Unseen on NPR. During the segment, Susan Jane Gilman, the author of Undress Me in the Temple of Heaven, described her affinity for Suskind's work. "Suskind's literary talent is double barreled. He's a Pulitzer Prize–winning journalist who lived with the Jennings at close range for several years. But he's also a master storyteller with the lyricism of a poet."
