= Reality-based community =

Derisive term for certain people

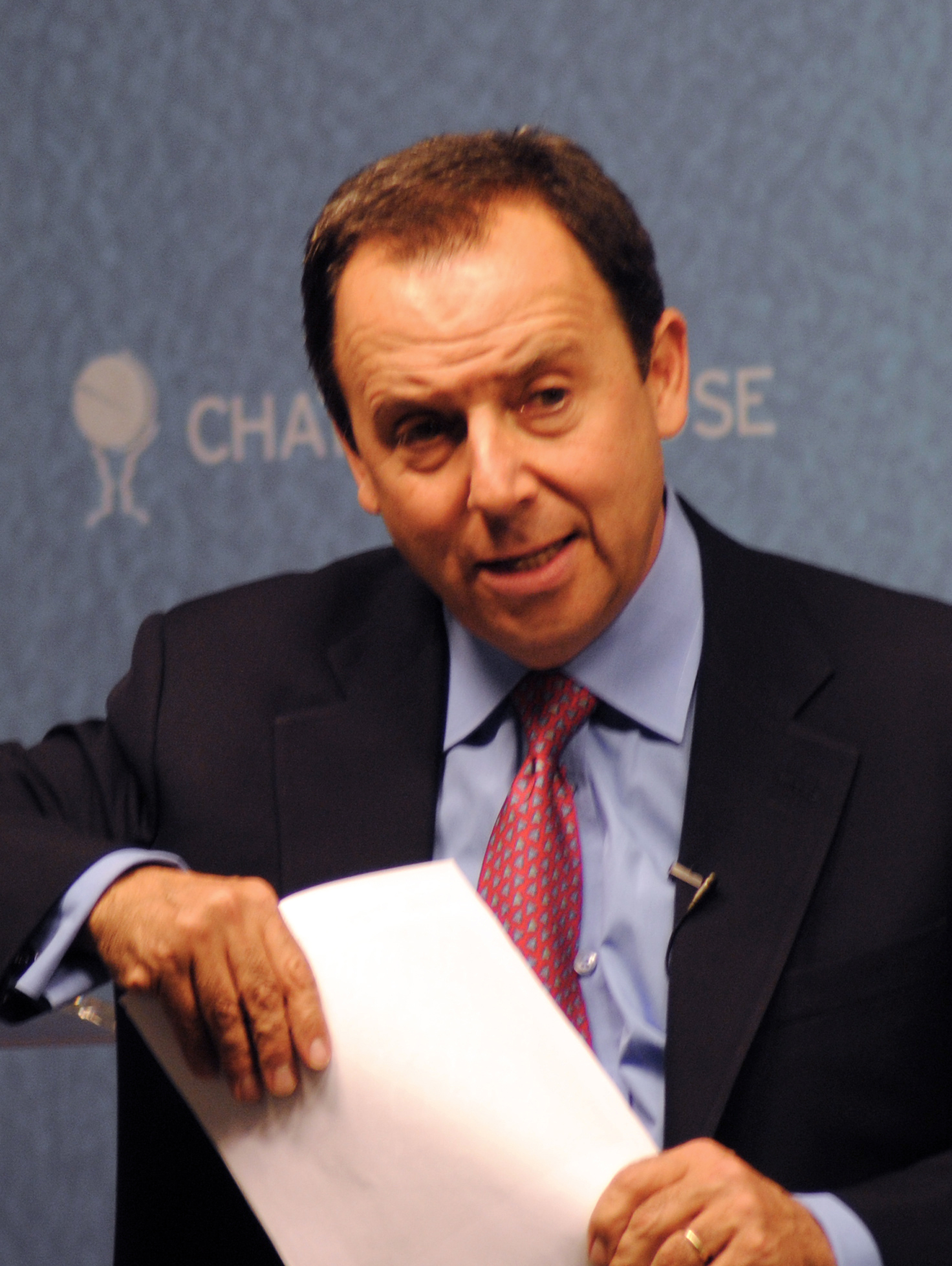
Ron Suskind, the journalist who attributed the phrase to a White House official

Reality-based community is a derisive term for people who base judgments on facts. It was first attributed to a senior official working for U.S. president George W. Bush by the reporter Ron Suskind in 2004. Many American liberals adopted the label for themselves, using it to portray themselves as adhering to facts in contrast to conservatives presumed to be disregarding professional and scientific expertise.

== Origin ==
The phrase was attributed by journalist Ron Suskind to an unnamed official in the George W. Bush administration who used it to denigrate a critic of the administration's policies as someone who based their judgments on facts. In a 2004 article appearing in the New York Times Magazine, Suskind wrote:

The aide said that guys like me were 'in what we call the reality-based community,' which he defined as people who 'believe that solutions emerge from your judicious study of discernible reality.' [...] 'That's not the way the world really works anymore,' he continued. 'We're an empire now, and when we act, we create our own reality. And while you're studying that reality—judiciously, as you will—we'll act again, creating other new realities, which you can study too, and that's how things will sort out. We're history's actors...and you, all of you, will be left to just study what we do'.

International relations scholar Fred Halliday writes that the phrase reality-based community (in contrast to faith-based community) was used "for those who did not share [the Bush administration's] international goals and aspirations". Suskind has maintained his refusal to name the speaker, but the source of the quotation was widely speculated to be Bush's senior advisor Karl Rove.

== Reactions ==
Political scientist and former U.S. National Security Advisor Zbigniew Brzezinski characterized the encounter with the senior White House aide, as reported by Suskind, as exemplary of the "arrogance that swept the Bush White House". Journalist Steven Poole compared the phrase to Hannah Arendt's definition of totalitarian thinking, which she described as having "extreme contempt for facts".

Historian David Greenberg writes that many American liberals adopted the term as a badge of honor. The words "[Proud to be a Member of the] Reality-Based Community" appeared on blogs and T-shirts. The term was used to mock the Bush administration's funding of faith-based social programmes, as well as a perceived hostility to professional and scientific expertise among American conservatives.

The quote in its entirety was prominently featured in the song "Walk It Back" from The National's 2017 album Sleep Well Beast, and Newsweek asked Rove and Suskind to comment on its inclusion. Rove denied being the speaker, stating that the quote itself was fictitious, and Suskind maintained both the veracity of the quote and his refusal to identify the source. Commentators have also drawn parallels between the 2004 quote and the rise of post-truth politics in the late 2010s.

== See also ==
- Alternative facts
- Consensus reality
- Fake news
- Truthiness
