= Ron Suskind =

American journalist

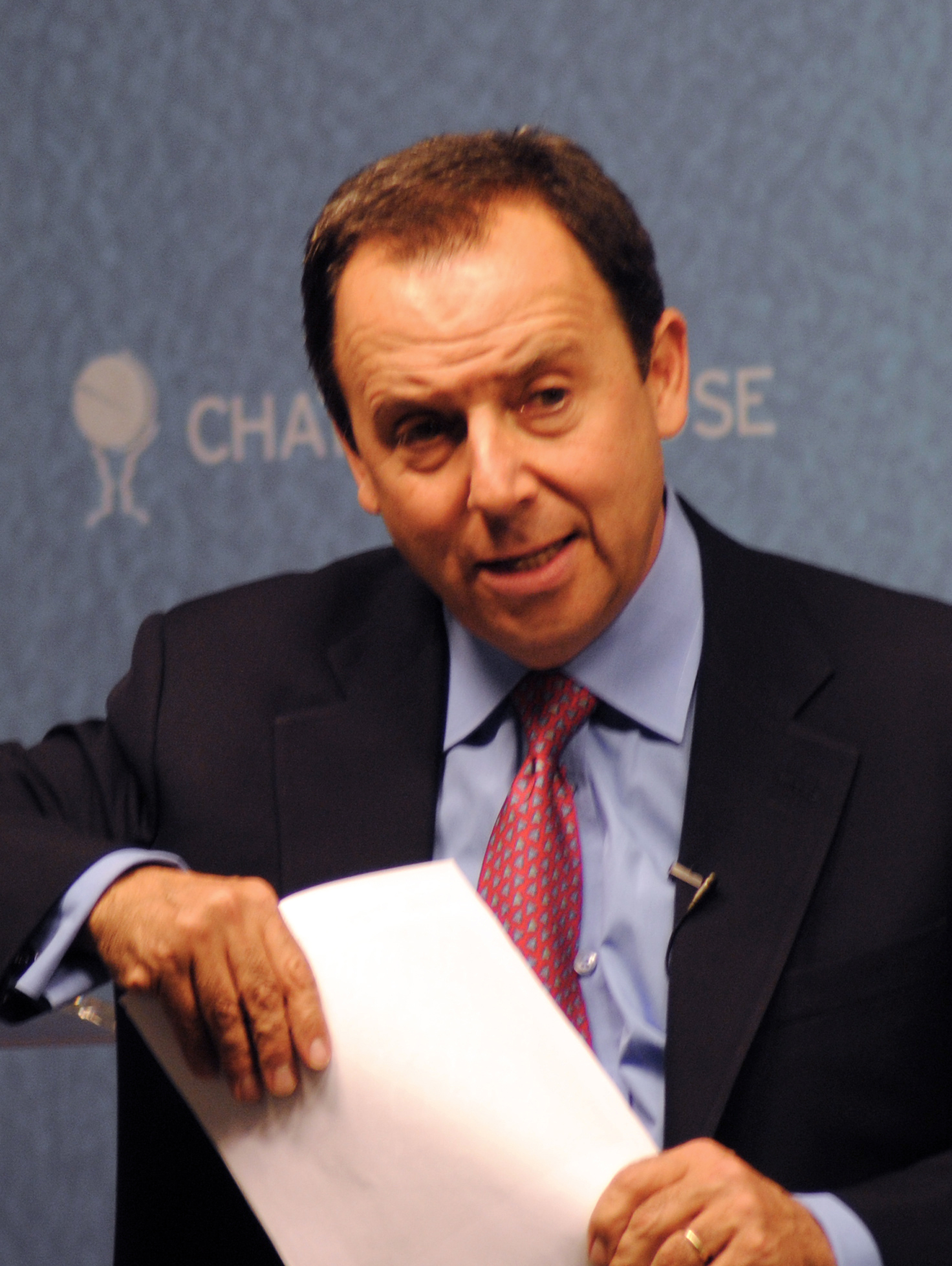
- Suskind in 2012
- Born: Ronald Steven Suskind; November 20, 1959 (age 66); Kingston, New York, U.S.
- Education: University of Virginia; Columbia University
- Occupations: Journalist, author, filmmaker
- Agent: The Wylie Agency
- Notable credit(s): The New York Times, The Wall Street Journal, Esquire
- Spouse: Cornelia Anne Kennedy (m. 1986)
- Children: Walter, Owen

Ronald Steven Suskind (born November 20, 1959) is an American journalist, author, and filmmaker. He was the senior national affairs writer for The Wall Street Journal from 1993 to 2000, where he won the 1995 Pulitzer Prize for Feature Writing for articles that became the starting point for his first book, A Hope in the Unseen. His other books include The Price of Loyalty, The One Percent Doctrine, The Way of the World, Confidence Men, and his memoir Life, Animated: A Story of Sidekicks, Heroes, and Autism, from which he made an Emmy Award-winning, Academy Award-nominated feature documentary. Suskind has written about the George W. Bush administration, the Barack Obama administration, and related issues of the United States' use of power.

== Life and career ==
Suskind was born in Kingston, New York, to a Jewish family. He is the son of Shirley Berney and Walter B. Suskind, and a second cousin of producer David Susskind. He grew up in Wilmington, Delaware, and graduated from Concord High School, after which he attended the University of Virginia. In 1983 he received a master's degree from Columbia University's Graduate School of Journalism.

In 1990, Suskind went to The Wall Street Journal, and became senior national affairs reporter in 1993. In 1995, he won the Pulitzer Prize for Feature Writing for two articles on Cedric Jennings, a student at inner-city Ballou High School in Washington, D.C., who wanted to attend MIT. Suskind left the Journal in 2000.

Suskind has written six books, and he has published in such periodicals as Esquire and The New York Times Magazine. In 2004, he discussed his book The Price of Loyalty on CBS's 60 Minutes. In 2006 he discussed The One Percent Doctrine on The Colbert Report, and in 2008 he discussed The Way of the World on The Daily Show with Jon Stewart, and again appeared on the show when his 2011 book, Confidence Men, was published. He has also appeared on NBC's Today Show, ABC's Nightline and PBS's Charlie Rose. In 2001 and 2002, he was a contributor to "Life 360," a joint production of ABC and PBS. Between 2004 and 2008, he made appearances on Frontline, the PBS series. On May 13, 2014, he appeared on The Daily Show to discuss his book Life, Animated, the real-life story of his autistic son, Owen Suskind, and "his irrepressible wife," Cornelia.

In the spring of 2012, Suskind was the A.M. Rosenthal Writer-in-Residence at the Harvard Kennedy School's Shorenstein Center on Media, Politics and Public Policy. At the Shorenstein Center he conducted four workshops for students about the process of reporting and writing titled, "Truth and Consequences: Crafting Powerful Narratives in the Age of Message."

Suskind has two sons with his wife, Cornelia Anne Kennedy Suskind. The couple married in 1988. Cornelia is the granddaughter of Democratic Representative Martin J. Kennedy.

== Articles ==
In 2002, Suskind wrote two articles in Esquire on the workings of the George W. Bush White House. The first article, in June 2002, focused on presidential adviser Karen Hughes. White House Chief of Staff Andrew Card said that the pragmatic Hughes was "the beauty to Karl's beast", referring to Bush's advisor Karl Rove. According to Card, her resignation signified a political shift in the administration further to the right. Suskind's second Esquire story about Rove, in December 2002, carried the comments and a long memo from Bush's former head of the White House Office of Faith-based and Community initiatives John DiIulio, an official who left the White House and spoke about his experiences. DiIulio criticized the Bush administration for having "no policy apparatus" and fixating on political calculation, and was quoted as saying "it's the reign of the Mayberry Machiavellis," a comment he then explained in a 3,000-word, on-the-record memo to Suskind about his time in the administration. DiIulio later attempted to recant some of his characterizations.

An October 2004 cover story by Suskind in the New York Times Magazine stated that the president was planning to partially privatize Social Security as his first initiative if re-elected—a disclosure that prompted controversy in the final two weeks of the campaign. In the article, Suskind quoted an unnamed advisor to Bush (later identified as someone who "seems to have been" Rove) as saying that

guys like me were 'in what we call the reality-based community,' which he defined as people who 'believe that solutions emerge from your judicious study of discernible reality.' I nodded and murmured something about enlightenment principles and empiricism. He cut me off. 'That's not the way the world really works anymore,' he continued. 'We're an empire now, and when we act, we create our own reality. And while you're studying that reality— judiciously, as you will—we'll act again, creating other new realities, which you can study too, and that's how things will sort out. We're history's actors ... and you, all of you, will be left to just study what we do.'

== Books ==
=== A Hope in the Unseen ===
In 1995 Suskind wrote a series of articles on the struggles of inner-city honors students in Washington, D.C, for which he won the Pulitzer Prize. Parts of these articles were used in his first book, A Hope in the Unseen (Doubleday/Broadway, 1998). The story chronicles the two-year journey of Cedric L. Jennings, an honor student who aspires to escape his blighted D.C. upbringing by going to an Ivy League university.

The book was chosen by The New York Times, Chicago Tribune, Washington Monthly and Booklist as one of the best books of the year. The New York Times Book Review called it an "extraordinary, formula-shattering book". David Halberstam called it a "beautiful book of a heroic American struggle." The book has been a selection in college courses on American culture, education, sociology and creative writing, and has been a required reading for incoming freshmen at some universities. In 2008, the book was selected as part of the "One Maryland, One Book" program.

In a review of the book, CNN declared: "As more voters, politicos and talk-show hosts write off affirmative action as a well-intentioned anachronism, A Hope in the Unseen should be required reading for would-be opinion-mongers." In his review for Newsday, Bill Reel stated "I changed my thinking about affirmative action. I was against it, now I am for it. The agent of change was a mind-opening book—A Hope in the Unseen by Ron Suskind."

The book has been a favorite of Bill Clinton and school reformer Michelle Rhee, and Barack Obama.

Suskind says his writing style for this book was to use exhaustive reporting to place readers inside the heads of characters. Suskind stated that this "writing style" was a delving into motive and intent in an effort to understand the "good enough reasons" that underlie actions, which allowed for a fuller, more accurate—and often emotionally powerful—rendering of characters. The Chicago Tribune called the book "the new, new nonfiction."

=== The Price of Loyalty ===
The Price of Loyalty was published on January 13, 2004. The book, which chronicled the two-year tenure of United States Treasury Secretary Paul O'Neill, was about the conduct and character of the Bush presidency. While the book covered a number of foreign and domestic issues, it is focussed on events that culminated in the Iraq War.

Among the disclosures in the book, which drew from numerous sources and more than 19,000 internal government documents, one was that the overthrow of Saddam Hussein and the U.S. occupation of Iraq was planned from Bush's first U.S. National Security Council meeting in January 2001, soon after Bush took office. This lay in contrast to the perception that concerns over Iraq came to the forefront after the September 11 attacks in 2001. Administration officials have contended that O'Neill confused contingency plans with actual plans for invasion.

Rather than denying his allegations, Bush officials attacked O'Neill's credibility, while answering that regime change in Iraq had been official U.S. policy since 1998, three years before Bush took office. However, O'Neill's claims called into question the relationship of the Iraq occupation to the post-9/11 war on terrorism. After the cover sheet of a packet containing classified information was shown during a 60 Minutes interview of O'Neill and Suskind, the United States Department of Treasury investigated whether both men had improperly received classified materials. It concluded in March 2004 that no laws were violated, but that inadequate document handling policies at the Treasury had allowed 140 documents which should have been marked classified to be entered into a computer system for unclassified documents. The documents were among those subsequently released to O'Neill in response to a legal document request and then given to Suskind.

In domestic affairs, the statements by O'Neill about the administration's allegedly chaotic and politically driven policy-making process supported the claims of John DiIulio. O'Neill stated that Vice President Cheney had become part of "a co-presidency" with George W. Bush. One of the book's disclosures involved the conflict between O'Neill and Cheney over what would become the 2003 tax cut. O'Neill, in a November 2002 meeting with Cheney and other senior officials, said that it was unprecedented to cut taxes at a time of war and that the cuts—which included the wealthiest Americans—would eventually push the government toward "fiscal crisis." Cheney's response was, "Reagan proved deficits don't matter. We won the midterms. This is our due." O'Neill opposed this policy.

=== The One Percent Doctrine ===
The One Percent Doctrine is Suskind's third book, published in 2006. The book is about the evolution of the foreign policy of the younger Bush's administration especially in the wake of the September 11 attacks. Excerpts of book were published in the June 18, 2006, issue of Time. Based on interviews with more than a hundred sources, including several cabinet officials, the book concluded that U.S. foreign policy since 9/11 was driven by the Bush Doctrine, which is described by a quote from Vice President Dick Cheney saying that it was important for the U.S. to think of "low probability, high impact events"—like terrorists or rogue states getting their hands on WMD—"in a new way."

If there's a 1% chance that Pakistani scientists are helping al-Qaeda build or develop a nuclear weapon, we have to treat it as a certainty in terms of our response. It's not about our analysis. ... It's about our response.

The doctrine, Suskind asserts, freed the administration from the dictates of evidence and allowed suspicion to be a guide for action in both its battles against terrorists and against rogue states, like Iraq under Saddam Hussein.

One of Suskind's assertions—that a suspect in the London subway bombings was on a US "no fly" list and attempted to enter the US—has been challenged by the US government. The FBI described Suskind's reporting on this single matter as "inaccurate", and issued a statement saying "the author has intertwined facts ... causing some confusion."

Despite being vetted by the CIA prior to publication, the book contained enough information to identify Aimen Dean, a mole within al Qaeda who had spent seven and a half years working for MI6 and had proven one of their most valuable assets. He was forced to quit his role and go into hiding, after extremists issued a Fatwa calling for his death. This act has been called ill advised and selfish by many in the intelligence community and the media.

The book was a New York Times Bestseller. Frank Rich called it a "must-read bestseller" while Michael Hill stated: "If Bob Woodward is the chronicler of the Bush administration, Ron Suskind is the analyst ... Historians will be grateful for it as they write the many final drafts in the decades to come."

=== The Way of the World ===
The Way of the World: A Story of Truth and Hope in an Age of Extremism was published on August 5, 2008. The book tells of people engaged in the challenges of national security and cultural connection. Among these stories are the tales of an intelligence official working to combat nuclear terrorism, a detainee lawyer fighting for rights at the Guantanamo Bay detention camp, a young Pakistani man interrogated under the White House, an Afghan teenager who spends a year in American high school, and former Pakistani prime minister Benazir Bhutto as she returns to Pakistan to challenge President Pervez Musharraf.

In his assessment for the Literary Review, Michael Burleigh said: "Using a series of interwoven stories, some hopeful, others disturbing, Suskind explores whether the United States and the Muslim world will ever be able to find mutual respect and understanding. ... This is a hugely important field that has never been so well examined." The Sunday Times declared "Suskind is never unsympathetic to his characters, who he appears to have debriefed intensively. He is a romantic, a writer who clearly believes that his country has betrayed its past, its values and its moral compass by failing to tell the truth about the war." The New York Observer said: "Moving. ... Mr. Suskind is a prodigiously talented craftsman. ... It's all here: a cast of characters that sprawls across class and circumstance to represent the totality of a historical moment. ... These hard times, Mr. Suskind's book suggests, call for a nonfiction Dickens."

Mark Danner, reviewing the book for The New York Times, writes that "these narratives and others perform, in Mr. Suskind's hands, an intricate arabesque and manage, to a rather remarkable degree, to show us, in this age of terror, 'the true way of the world.'" It is around the stories of these characters that the book frames the debate about how America lost much of its moral authority in recent years and how it is struggling, often through the actions and initiative of individuals, to restore it.

The Way of the World made a series of disclosures centered on Tahir Jalil Habbush al-Tikriti, the head of Iraqi intelligence under Saddam Hussein. The book said that British and American intelligence entered into a dialogue with Habbush before the invasion of Iraq, in which Habbush revealed that Saddam possessed no weapons of mass destruction and did not take an American invasion seriously. The book also contends that the Central Intelligence Agency resettled Habbush, paid him $5 million, and forged a document in his name alleging that 9/11 hijacker Mohammad Atta trained in Iraq.

The White House, former CIA director George Tenet, and former CIA officer Robert Richer, a figure in the book, denied involvement in the illegal act of fabricating the Habbush letter, denials that were echoed in an official CIA statement, saying of Suskind's claim that the White House ordered the agency to forge a letter from Habbush: "It did not happen."

Suskind responded to the Rob Richer's denial, circulated by the White House, by posting on his website a partial transcript of a taped conversation with Richer in which the two discuss the Habbush forgery. In response to the official CIA statement, Suskind told The Washington Post that the disclosures and details in his book are backed up by hours of interviews and that there is "not a shred of doubt about any of it." On August 11, House Judiciary Committee chairman John Conyers announced that his committee would look into the matter of the Habbush letter and a variety of other disclosures in the book.

The Way of the World debuted at number 3 on The New York Times Best Seller list, but some remarked that its revelations did not produce the outrage or scandal that would seem to attend a White House-run disinformation campaign aimed at U.S. public opinion. The layers of the controversy have nonetheless deepened with the revelation that Ayad Allawi, the initial source of the Habbush letter, was at CIA headquarters the week before the letter emerged, and a piece in The American Conservative by Philip Giraldi that claims an "extremely reliable and well placed source in the intelligence community" confirmed that the Vice President's Office was behind the Habbush letter, but that "Doug Feith's Office of Special Plans", not the CIA, carried out the forgery.

Some disclosures in The Way of the World received less attention than the Habbush controversy, but the story the book tells about Pervez Musharraf's actions toward Benazir Bhutto during the last months of her life was picked up in the Pakistani press and dovetailed with a movement calling for the impeachment of the (now former) Pakistani president. Speaking to another aspect of the book, Mark Danner, in his review for The New York Times, writes that "the revelation of an effort to steal and sell fissile material in Georgia's now celebrated 'breakaway region' of South Ossetia ... is only the most terrifying of a dozen or more newsworthy disclosures in this book." Suskind cites the battle against nuclear terrorism as the most pressing crisis the United States needs to combat in order to restore its moral authority, and details an ambitious attempt to infiltrate the worldwide nuclear black market, called the "Armageddon Test."

=== Confidence Men ===
Confidence Men: Wall Street, Washington and the Education of a President was published on September 20, 2011, by HarperCollins. It describes the 2008 financial crisis, which began in the U.S., and the attempts by President Barack Obama's White House to combat it.

On September 15, 2011, news of the book began to leak to the press. The New York Times, having obtained an advanced copy, wrote: "The book offers a portrait of a White House operating under intense pressure as it dealt with a cascade of crises, from insolvent banks to collapsing carmakers. And it details the rivalries among figures around the president, including Mr. Summers; Mr. Geithner; the former chief of staff, Rahm Emanuel; and the budget director, Peter R. Orszag."

An article in The Washington Post on September 16 elaborated on the content of the book, citing the allegation that Treasury Secretary Timothy F. Geithner ignored a directive from the president to draw up plans for restructuring Citibank in the spring of 2009. The article also notes that in an interview in the book, Geithner denies the account saying "I don't slow-walk the president on anything". The White House pushed back against the book in spite of having granted Ron Suskind an interview with the president. Communications director Dan Pfeiffer said that books like these "tend to take the normal day-to-day activities of governing and infuse them with drama, palace intrigue and salacious details".

While some faulted Suskind for giving greater credence to the views of sources who gave him more journalistic access others praised him for doing the opposite. In his review for The New York Times Book Review, Joe Nocera wrote "to his everlasting credit, Suskind savages several people he clearly spent time interviewing, starting with Obama's former chief economic adviser, Larry Summers, and Timothy Geithner, his Treasury secretary. And he's more than willing to step outside his re-created scenes to conduct interviews, in which Obama aides and allies tell truths that are genuinely painful to hear."

In his first television appearance, on the Today Show, Suskind was interviewed by anchor Ann Curry, who cited the White House pushback in her questioning. Suskind maintained that the book represented an accurate depiction of what he had found in his reporting. Hendrik Hertzberg wrote in his review of the book for The New Yorker that it would offer "support for some of today's standard progressive gripes about the President" being stymied by his conservative, Wall Street-attentive advisers, "and for a few of the conservative ones," namely assertions that Obama arrived in office unprepared to lead. In his review of the book for The New York Times, Joe Nocera noted that the book had "an omniscient quality" of fly-on-the-wall scenes from inside the White House, much like the books of Bob Woodward, but "doesn't really go for phony omniscience" where the sources who are most cooperative are rendered most favorably. In a New Republic review, John B. Judis wrote, "Suskind's book is being widely portrayed as critical of the Obama administration, but if you read the entire book, its message is that during Obama's first two years he was foiled by his own inexperience as a manager and by a staff that didn't do good by him, but that after the Democratic defeat in 2010 he learned from his failure."

Both Summers and Geithner, who responded to disclosures in the book's pages, pushed back against their characterizations after publication.

A week after publication, the book debuted at No. 2 on The New York Times Best Seller list for Nonfiction.

According to the book President Obama supported a financial transaction tax on trades of stocks, derivatives, and other financial instruments, but he was blocked by Summers.

Confidence Men was cited on various "best book" lists, and named an Esquire 2011 Best Book of the Year, with David Granger commenting: "Journalism like this is all too rare." In the March 2012 issue of The Atlantic, James Fallows cited Confidence Men in his article "Obama, Explained," writing that the Obama administration's "early failure of accountability" in its "apparent coddling of Wall Street in 2009 ... is the main theme of Ron Suskind's Confidence Men ... it created a substantive and symbolic problem the administration has never fully recovered from. Substantive, because of the moral hazard created by using public money to guarantee the bonuses and repay the losses of people who had been so recklessly destructive. Symbolic, for all the reasons that eventually came to a head with last year's Occupy movement. An official familiar with the administration's economic policy told me: 'The recapitalization of the banks was a good idea, and necessary. But we did not put enough conditions on [their] getting the money. Ultimately not being tougher with the guys that got the money is the thing that overthrows the government twice—in 2008 [in a reaction against Bush's TARP plan] and again in 2010.'"

=== Life, Animated ===
Life, Animated: A Story of Sidekicks, Heroes, and Autism was published on April 1, 2014, by Kingswell (an imprint of Disney Publishing Worldwide). It is the number 1 best seller under the category of "Special Needs Biographies" on Amazon, and also made The New York Times Best Seller list under Science Books. The memoir describes the Suskind family's two-decade journey in connecting with their youngest son Owen, who was diagnosed at age 3 with regressive autism, lost his ability to speak, and then developed an obsessive interest in Disney movies. Once the family discovered this, they began to play the roles of animated characters and conversing in Disney dialogue – a method that over years helped their son regain speech. Suskind chose to publish the book through a Disney imprint because of his son's frequent quotation of Disney movies in the book; otherwise, he would have had to pay licensing fees for each line of dialogue used. However, Disney agreed to exert no influence over any of the contents of the book. In the memoir, Suskind explains how the family and therapists helped Owen use the Disney stories to relate to real situations, develop "inner speech" capacities, and gradually connect to others. He calls this intense interest in Disney an example of an autism "affinity," referring to the propensity for individuals with autism to develop sustained, self-directed passions in one or a few subject areas. The Suskinds found that these deep interests – long viewed as unproductive obsessions that should be curtailed – are more "pathway than prison" for individuals with autism or other untraditional learners, insofar they use them "like an enigma machine to crack the codes of the wider world and find their way forward."

The New York Times book review of Life, Animated wrote that Suskind "charts Owen's remarkable journey back to connection through the unlikely vehicle of the Disney cartoons that are his only passion." USA Today called Owen "every reader's son," writing that "For Owen and his family, Disney evolved into his translator of reality. He memorized every line of dialogue in the films and learned, in his own way, how to re-enact each scene, fully loaded with the emotions and the moral lessons embedded in them. And his family, despite the misgivings of their doctors, learned to connect with Owen through Disney as well." The St. Louis Post-Dispatch called it a "wonderful book, whether or not you know a person with autism," and asserted that, "without delving into too much statistical and informational overload, Suskind explains in a straightforward way many of the differences in how people with autism perceive and process information." A chapter that was excerpted in the March 9th issue of the New York Times Magazine became the most emailed piece of the month.

Suskind describes the positive response as a "giant warm wave" that differentiates this "personal" narrative from his others. He has since spoken to audiences at the United Nations and the NIH; testified in front of the United States Congress; and appeared on numerous TV and radio shows, including ABC's Good Morning America, NBC's Nightly News with Brian Williams, CBS's Sunday Morning, NPR and The Daily Show with Jon Stewart.

On April 2, 2014, for World Autism Awareness Day, Ron spoke to the UN about his family's experience, stressing the need for government-funded research and support around the world. On April 7, The New York Times reported the methodology the family created, which they called "Affinity Therapy," will be studied by researchers from MIT, Yale, and Cambridge University to try to understand the neural mechanisms at work and develop a manualized, therapeutic model harnessing affinities for those with autism.

On October 17, 2014, in a feature column for The New York Times about her own autistic son's relationship with Siri, Apple's personal assistant software for iPhone, Judith Newman stated that Suskind "is talking to SRI (Stanford Research Institute) about having assistants for those with autism that can be programmed to speak in the voice of the character that reaches them."

== Films ==
=== Life, Animated ===
A&E Indie Films announced in August 2014 that it was producing a documentary, directed by Academy Award-winning director Roger Ross Williams, on Owen and the Suskinds' story.

The documentary, Life, Animated, based on Suskind's book of the same name, was co-produced by Williams with Julie Goldman, Carolyn Hepburn and Christopher Clements. Suskind was executive producer of the film.

The film won two Emmy awards, and was nominated for an Academy Award for best documentary feature.
