= Duane A. Moody =

American opera singer (born 1970)

- Born: December 3, 1970 (age 54); Washington, DC, U.S.
- Occupation(s): Tenor and Pianist
- Website: www.duaneamoody.com

Duane Adolph Moody (born December 3, 1970) is an American tenor solo artist and also a member of the African-American trio Three Mo' Tenors. In addition to performing, he is a former associate professor teaching voice at Berklee College of Music and former instructor and coach with the Levine School of Music in Washington DC.

== Life and career ==
Moody was born in Washington, D.C. He studied vocal performance and operatic studies at The Peabody Institute, from which he graduated in 1994. In addition, he went to Boston University and obtained his Master of Music in Vocal Performance in 1997. After his M.M. in music, he went back to The Peabody Institute in 2001 and graduated with a diploma in opera performance.

After finishing his musical studies, he went on an international tour as Sportin' Life in Gershwin's Porgy and Bess from 1999 to 2005. He has been involved with the Three Mo' Tenors group since 2007. Moody has made multiple debuts as a tenor at The Royal Festival Hall (London), Tel Aviv Opera (Israel), Hamburg Staatsoper (Hamburg, Germany), Alte Oper (Frankfurt, Germany), Des Moines Opera, Dayton Opera, New York City Opera (touring company) and has been presented in a premiere solo recital at The Terrace Theatre of The John F. Kennedy Center for the Performing Arts (Washington, DC). He has also done orchestral appearances with The Fayetteville Symphony Orchestra, The Indianapolis Symphony Orchestra (Pop Series), The Spokane Symphony (Pop Series), The Reading Symphony and The Frederick Symphony in their presentation of Beethoven’s 9th symphony. In 2014 he sang in the world premiere of Lawrence Reis's cantata, Sea Surface Full of Clouds with the Washington Metropolitan Philharmonic, and in 2015 released his latest album Sur Mon Voyage which includes works by Wolfgang Amadeus Mozart, Franz Liszt, Richard Strauss and Elliot Carter.

== Awards ==
- 2002 DC Commission on the Arts and Humanities, Outstanding Emerging Artist
- 1995 Regional Semi-Finalist, Metropolitan Opera National Council Auditions

== Performances ==
=== Opera ===
- Leoncavallo, Tonio in I Pagliacci, MD L. Opera
- Principal Artist, Three Mo’ Tenors, Little Schubert
- Proto/Chenault, Young Joe in Shadowboxer, MD Opera Studio
- Gershwin, Sportin’ Life in Porgy and Bess, International Tours
- Weiser, Phillip Herriton in Where Angels Fear To Tread, Peabody Opera (world premiere)
- Massanet, Des Grieux in Manon Peabody Opera
- Mozart, 2nd Priest in Die Zauberflöte Peabody Opera

=== Oratorio ===
- G. F. Handel Messiah Reading Symphony
- Dubois The Seven Last Words St. Luke’s Episcopal
- Saint-Saens Christmas Oratorio St. Luke’s Episcopal
- L. V. Beethoven 9th Symphony Reading Symphony

== Discography ==
- 2001 Three Mo’ Tenors, Three Mo’ Tenors: Live in Chicago Recorded at The Oriental Theater
- 2010 INSPIRATA, Sacred Sounds. Recorded at A1A Studios, Jacksonville, FL
- 2013 A Christmas Recital: Live
- 2016 Sur Mon Voyage
