= George W. Bush shoe-throwing incident =

2008 incident in Baghdad, Iraq

- Part of the Iraq War
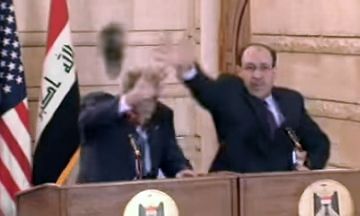
- Bush ducks under one of al-Zaidi's shoes as Iraqi prime minister Nouri al-Maliki attempts to parry it.
- Location: Republican Palace; Baghdad, Iraq
- Date: 14 December 2008; 17 years ago
- Target: George W. Bush, the 43rd President of the United States
- Attack type: Shoe-throwing
- Weapon: Pair of shoes
- Deaths: 0
- Injuries: 2 (Dana Perino and Muntadhar al-Zaidi, neither of the injuries were caused by the shoes)
- Perpetrator: Muntadhar al-Zaidi
- Motive: Retaliation for casualties of the Iraq War
- Convictions: Assaulting a foreign head of state during an official visit
- Sentence: 1 year imprisonment (released after 9 months)

On 14 December 2008, Iraqi journalist Muntadhar al-Zaidi removed his shoes and threw them at then United States president George W. Bush during a joint press conference with Iraqi prime minister Nouri al-Maliki in Baghdad, Iraq. Bush quickly ducked, avoiding being hit by either shoe. The second shoe collided with a U.S. flag positioned behind Bush. Al-Zaidi was subsequently grabbed, and removed from the room by security.

Al-Zaidi received a three-year prison sentence, which was reduced by two years. On 15 September 2009, after nine months of imprisonment, he was released early as he had no prior criminal record.

There have since been many other shoe-throwing incidents on an international scale.

== Event ==
Video of the incident

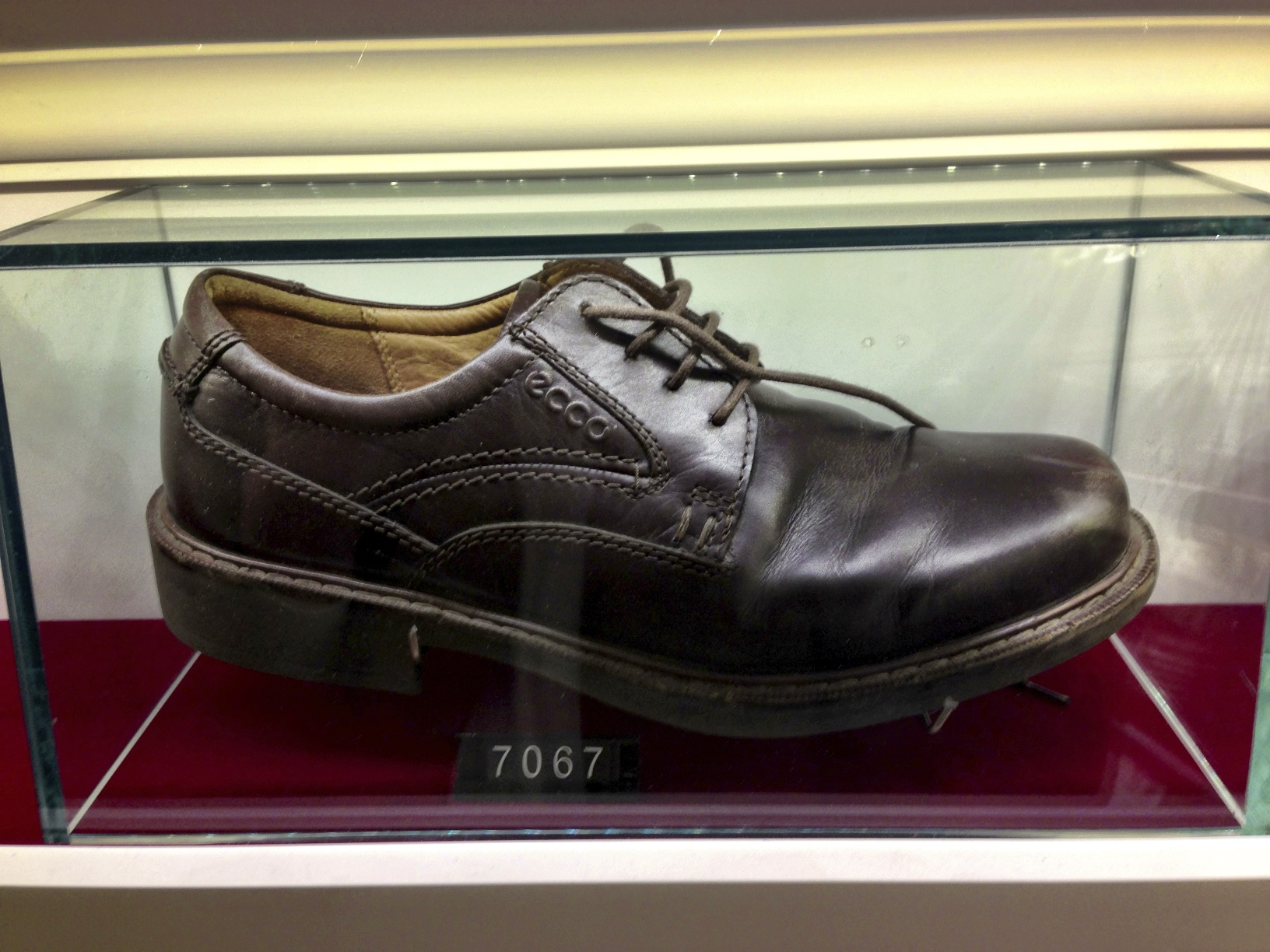
Replica of the shoe thrown at George W. Bush appears in a display at the Mmuseumm in New York City.

During a 14 December 2008 press conference at the prime minister's palace in Baghdad, Iraq, Iraqi journalist Muntadhar al-Zaidi threw both of his shoes at United States president George W. Bush. Bush was scheduled to leave office roughly five weeks later, following the inauguration of his successor Barack Obama. As he threw his first shoe, al-Zaidi yelled "This is a farewell kiss from the Iraqi people, dog", in Arabic. As he threw the second, he yelled "This is for the widows and the orphans and all those murdered in Iraq". Bush ducked twice, successfully avoiding both shoes, and Prime Minister Nouri al-Maliki attempted to catch one of the shoes to protect him. Al-Zaidi was pulled to the floor by Blackwater security guards before being grabbed by Maliki's guards, kicked, and rushed out of the room. White House Press Secretary Dana Perino was hit in the face by a microphone boom knocked over by a presidential bodyguard, resulting in a black eye.

Bush said that some Iraqi reporters had apologized to him. "Thanks for apologizing on behalf of the Iraqi people. It doesn't bother me", he said. "If you want the facts, it's a size 10 shoe that he threw." When asked about the incident by another reporter, Bush said, "It's a way for people to draw attention. I don't know what the guy's cause was. I didn't feel the least bit threatened by it." When later asked to reflect on the incident, Bush said, "I didn't have much time to reflect on anything, I was ducking and dodging. I'm not angry with the system. I believe that a free society is emerging, and a free society is necessary for our own security and peace." Perino said: "I don't think that you can take one guy throwing his shoe as representative of the people of Iraq."

Al-Zaidi was initially held by the prime minister's guards and was later turned over to the Iraqi army's Baghdad command. The command handed him over to the Iraqi judiciary. Hundreds of Iraqis took to the streets to demand his release. Al-Zaidi could have faced charges of insulting a foreign leader and the Iraqi prime minister. A conviction of these charges could have carried a sentence of up to two years in prison or a small fine, although he would have been unlikely to face the maximum penalty given his newfound "cult status" in the Arab world, according to a Middle-East observer. An Iraqi lawyer stated that al-Zaidi was likely to get at least two years in prison if he was prosecuted. On 16 December 2008, al-Zaidi appeared privately before a judge from within the Green Zone. He declined to be represented by Khalil al-Duleimi, who defended the late Iraqi leader Saddam Hussein before his execution, and also said that he wanted to be represented by an Iraqi lawyer. "I will introduce myself as his lawyer and demand the case be closed, and Muntader be released because he did not commit a crime," said Dheyaa al-Saadi, al-Zaidi's lawyer and head of the Iraqi Bar Association. "He only freely expressed himself to the occupier, and he has such a right according to international law."

== Context ==
Shoes are considered unclean in the Arab world. Effigies of many United States presidents had long appeared with shoes on them all over the Middle East. Matthew Cassel of The Electronic Intifada in the context of the "Bush shoeing" incident expressed the opinion that the Western media overplayed the phenomenon as being "Arab" in particular.

== Reaction ==
Following the incident, The New York Times reported that al-Zaidi was embraced around the Arab world. Al-Zaidi found support from his employer, Awn Hussain Al Khashlok, thousands of protesters in Iraq, some Iraqi politicians, people in Syria, a charity in Libya, and from "around 200 lawyers" including some U.S. citizens. Al-Zaidi's action was criticised by the government of Nouri al-Maliki. After the incident the office of Nouri al-Maliki criticised al-Zaidi's action and "demanded" an on-air apology from Al-Baghdadia TV. Al-Baghdadia TV issued a statement demanding al-Zaidi's release:

Al-Baghdadia television demands that the Iraqi authorities immediately release their stringer Muntadhar al-Zaidi, in line with the democracy and freedom of expression that the American authorities promised the Iraqi people on the ousting of former Iraqi leader Saddam Hussein.... Any measures against Muntadar will be considered the acts of a dictatorial regime.

In Tikrit, a 3-metre (10-foot) copper statue was dedicated to his action as a monument. It had his shoe's shape and an honouring poem as an inscription. It was designed by Laith al-Amari. The statue was taken down according to police order shortly after erection. Al-Zaidi was named as the world's third most powerful Arab, in the Arabian Business Power 100 list 2009.

A joke that was made amongst Iraqis stated that then Prime Minister, Nouri al-Maliki, should be "called up" to the national football team as a goalkeeper as his attempt of blocking the shoe was made "masterfully".

In September 2009, London-based artist Pawel Waniewski created "Proud Shoes" in tribute to Muntazer al-Zaidi's "shoe flying" incident. Waniewski's tribute to Mr. al-Zaidi's was a 21 kg bronze piece of art depicting the thrown shoes, completely gilded in 24 carat gold.

On 3 March 2010, Blancox, a Colombian detergent manufacturer made an advertisement out of the shoe-throwing incident, by replacing the shoes with beautiful bouquets of flowers to signify "fabric freshness and softness treasured in it".

Malcolm Smart of Amnesty International said "the Iraqi authorities have a duty to investigate all allegations of torture or other ill-treatment of Muntadhar al-Zaidi and to prosecute any persons alleged to be responsible for such abuses. The Iraqi authorities should also disclose his whereabouts, ensure that he is permitted prompt and regular access to legal counsel, his family and to any medical attention he requires, and safeguard him from torture or other ill-treatment," he added.

Reporters Without Borders expressed its "regret that [al-Zaidi] used this method of protest against the politics of the American president". It said that "[al-Zaidi] was clearly injured during his arrest" and called for him to be released from custody. It referred to Bush's "relaxed way" of speaking about the incident as a reason for "leniency".

The International Federation of Journalists said al-Zaidi should be released for humanitarian reasons. "Given the controversy surrounding this incident, we urge the Iraqi security services to guarantee the physical well-being of this journalist, who was clearly injured during his arrest," the statement said. The IFJ said the incident "reflected deep anger at the treatment of Iraqi civilians during US occupation over the past four years of which journalists have been major victims" and that "the journalist might be under threat while in detention given the record of mistreatment of journalists in custody by US forces."

The Arab Lawyers Union called for a fair trial for the journalist, with the support of both the Arab League and the Egyptian government. "We urge all human rights organizations and the international society to help save the life of the Iraqi journalist and prevent any physical assault that may target him," union head Sameh Ashour said.

The Lebanese television channel NTV offered a job to al-Zaidi. NTV said that if al-Zaidi accepted the job offer, that he would be paid "from the moment the first shoe was thrown".

Al-Zaidi's family turned down an invitation by the Venezuelan president to come and live in the Latin American country. "We are grateful to President Hugo Chávez. However we are Iraqis, we live in Iraq," Oudai al-Zaidi said speaking on the behalf of his family.

On 15 December 2008, the Libyan charity group Wa Attasimou headed by Libyan leader Muammar Gaddafi's daughter Aicha gave al-Zaidi a bravery award. The group urged for al-Zaidi's release.

In Syria, al-Zaidi was "hailed as a hero". The Malaysian Foreign Minister Rais Yatim praised the incident, calling it the "best show of retaliation so far". A commentary in the North Korean newspaper Minju Chosun said Bush "deserved" the shoe throwing incident as a result of "failed policy in Iraq".

A businessman offered his six-door Mercedes to Al-Zaidi for doing what "every single one of us has been wanting to do for a long time". The singer Shaaban Abdel Rahim wrote a song about Al-Zaidi, and an Egyptian man offered Al-Zaidi his 20-year-old daughter's hand in marriage. Comedic adaptions of the shoe throwing incident were featured on Afghan television, and in online shoe-throwing games such as "Sock and Awe".

On 29 December 2008, activists at the Iraqi consulate in Washington, D.C. delivered a petition calling for the release of al-Zaidi. "If he had wanted to hurt George Bush, he would have chosen a different weapon," a member of Code Pink said. "We want the Iraqi government and the world to know that there is a very good sentiment for him to be set free," said Nick Mottern, director of Consumers for Peace.

The Late Show with David Letterman "Great Moments in Presidential Speeches" segment included flying shoes aimed at other presidents (via digitally altered stock footage).

The Turkish company believed to have made the shoes thrown at Bush, Ramazan Baydan, experienced a surge in sales. Orders for 300,000 pairs were received in one week. A Saudi businessman offered US$10 million to buy the shoes thrown by al-Zaidi. There were also calls from throughout the Middle East to place the shoes in an Iraqi museum. The shoe, Ducati Model 271, first renamed "The Bush Shoe" and later "The Bye-Bye Bush Shoe", is manufactured by the Baydan Shoe Company in Istanbul. However, a producer in Lebanon suggested that it might have made them instead. Many shoes in Iraq are also made in China. Even so, al-Zaidi's brother insisted that the shoes were made in Baghdad by a highly reputable firm named Alaa Haddad. On 18 December 2008, Iraqi and American security agents looking for explosives examined and then destroyed the shoes.

A book called The Last Salute to President Bush was written about the event.

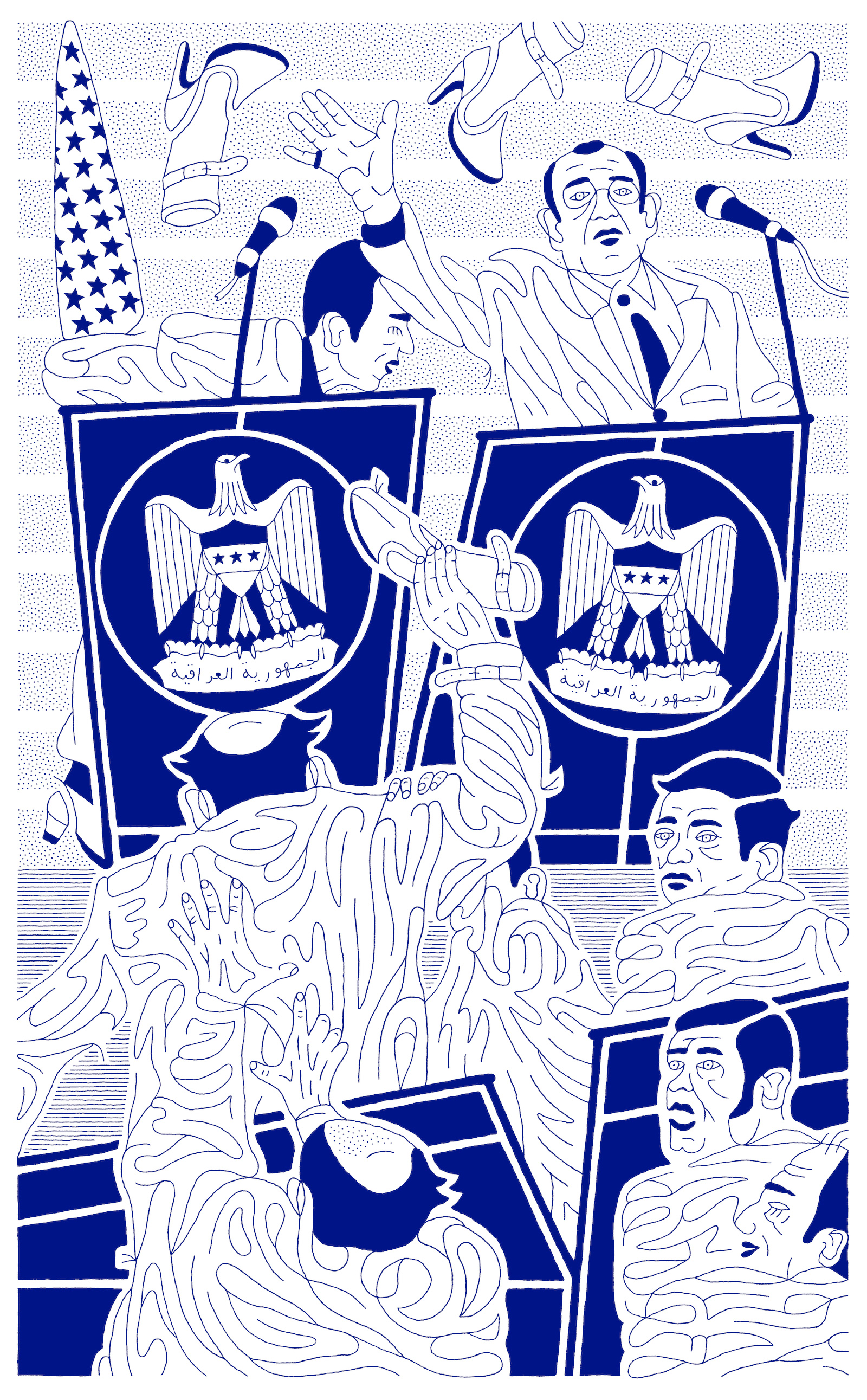
"Bush-Maliki News Conference. Baghdad, December 2008" 2009 by Dmitry Borshch

Mahesh Bhatt produced a play entitled The Last Salute, directed by Indian director Arvind Gaur and starring Imran Zahid. It was written by Rajesh Kumar and based on Muntadhar al-Zaidi's book. Pooja Bhatt and Mahesh Bhatt announced the making of a film based on the play. "Bush-Maliki News Conference. Baghdad, December 2008", a drawing by Dmitry Borshch, has been exhibited at the Institute of Oriental Studies of the Russian Academy of Sciences, DePaul University, Brecht Forum and is included in the Catalog of American Portraits, maintained by the Smithsonian's National Portrait Gallery.

=== Al-Zaidi ===
According to witnesses, al-Zaidi was "severely beaten" by security officers after he had been dragged out of the room following the shoe-throwing incident. As the man's screaming could be heard outside, Bush said "That's what people do in a free society, draw attention to themselves." A "large blood trail" could be seen on the carpet where al-Zaidi had been dragged by security agents. Dawa-owned Afaq TV reported that security forces kicked al-Zaidi and beat him. His family reports that they have received many threatening phone calls. The United States Secret Service and the Iraqi Police took custody of al-Zaidi. Al-Zaidi was tested for alcohol and drugs, and his shoes were confiscated as evidence. Al-Zaidi was interrogated by Iraqi and U.S. agents to ascertain whether anyone paid him to throw his shoes at Bush. In an interview with BBC News, al-Zaidi's brother, Durgham al-Zaidi, reported that Muntadhar al-Zaidi suffered a broken hand, broken ribs, internal bleeding, and an eye injury. Durgham al-Zaidi told Al Jazeera that his brother was tortured. Al-Baghdadia TV said that al-Zaidi was "seriously injured" during his detention. Al Sharqiya also points to signs of injury on his thighs and an immobile right arm. However, a different brother, Maitham al-Zaidi, spoke with Muntadhar on the phone and was told: "Thank God I am in good health." On Friday, 19 December, Dhia al-Kinani, the judge investigating the case, said there were signs al-Zaidi had been beaten; al-Zaidi had bruises on his face and around his eyes. The judge also said al-Zaidi had not yet raised a formal charge relating to his injuries. His lawyer, Dhiya'a al-Sa'adi, also confirmed that al-Zaidi had been beaten, stating that "there are visible signs of torture on his body".

== Timeline ==
- On 14 December 2008, the shoe-throwing incident took place, culminating in al-Zaidi's arrest.
- On 15 December 2008, hundreds of Iraqis marched in Baghdad to demand his release. Crowds gathered in Sadr City district of Baghdad and called for "hero" Muntadhar al-Zaidi to be freed from custody. There were similar scenes in Najaf. The demonstrators in Sadr City and Najaf alluded to the shoes. Participants in Sadr City "waved shoes attached to long poles," and those in Najaf threw their shoes at a passing United States military convoy. The "vast majority" of viewers of al-Baghdadia who telephoned to the station in order to express their opinions said that they approved al-Zaidi's actions.
- On 17 December 2008, a group of Iraqi lawmakers demanded that the legislature take up the issue of the detained journalist. Aqeel Abdul Hussain, head of the Sadrist bloc, said that lawmakers had a duty to stand up for the detained journalist. "Some of the members support the government, but we have to admit that there was a mistake in the procedures under which he was arrested," said a spokesman for Parliament Speaker Mashhadani. "And we also must condemn the fact that he was beaten," he added. The session of Parliament ended without a consensus on what action to take regarding the reporter.
- On 18 December 2008, a spokesman for Prime Minister Nouri al-Maliki said that al-Zaidi wrote a letter to Maliki expressing regret for his actions and asking for a pardon. Dhargham al-Zaidi claims that his brother was severely beaten after being taken into Iraqi custody. On 17 December, Amnesty International called on Iraqi authorities to disclose the whereabouts of al-Zaidi and investigate all allegations of torture or other ill-treatment. Judge Dhia al-Kinani, the magistrate investigating the incident, said the court has opened a probe into al-Zaidi's alleged beating. Dhiaa al-Saadi, head of the Iraqi Bar Association, said that, according to court documents, the reporter's face and body were bruised. "The investigation process is now under way in mysterious circumstances," al-Zaidi's brother Uday said.
- On 19 December 2008, thirty of al-Zaidi's family members staged a rally outside the "Green Zone," which houses the Iraqi government and the prison where al-Zaidi was being held. In response to an apology letter that al-Zaidi was said to have written, al-Zaidi's brother Uday stated that the apology was "not a real one. If they [the government] want an apology, they must first release him so he can do it freely and not under pressure." Um Saad, al-Zaidi's sister, said that al-Zaidi "would never apologize for insulting the man who occupied our country". She also said that "nothing is known about... his condition, but he did nothing wrong. On the contrary, he pleased everyone. Bush is an occupier, and he is the source of all the orphans and all the widows in Iraq." Bahaa al-Araji, a Sadrist MP, said journalist Muntathir al-Zaidi plans to press charges against the people who he says beat him. "We know that the judges themselves feel for him... tomorrow we will submit a formal request that Zaidi should be allowed visits by his family," he also said. "We should call him Muntathar al Iraqi — not Muntathar al-Zaidi; all of Iraq is his tribe now," a leader in the Sons of Iraq movement said of al-Zaidi.
- On 20 December 2008, it was reported that the letter that al-Zaidi is said to have written to Nouri al-Maliki apologizes only to Maliki and not to George W. Bush. Al-Zaidi said he had no remorse for throwing his shoes at Bush and "added that he would repeat his actions if he sees him again, because Bush's forces have killed many of Iraq's children". In a written statement to the judge, al-Zaidi said that he expected to be killed by Bush's bodyguards after hurling his first shoe. "It seemed that his bodyguards were not on full alert at the time[;] that was how I managed to throw the second shoe," al-Zaidi explained. Hundreds of protesters gathered in a park opposite the Green Zone to protest the treatment of al-Zaidi. Heavily armed Iraqi soldiers surrounded the small park and Iraqi Army helicopters circled overhead as the demonstrators were ordered to leave. "I have told them I won’t move anywhere unless it is to my grave," said al-Zaidi's brother, Uday. Sunnis and Shiites held signs describing al-Zaidi as "the son of Iraq" and "the humiliator of the occupiers". A few Iraqi soldiers ate food offered to them.
- On 21 December 2008, al-Zaidi claimed he was physically coerced and that he would never apologize to President Bush no matter what the consequences. "Muntadhar said that he was forced to apologize to Al-Maliki and he will never, never apologize to Bush, even if they cut him into small pieces," al-Zaidi's brother Uday told the Los Angeles Times. Al-Zaidi's brother claimed his journalist brother had lost a tooth and his nose had required stitches because of the beatings he had suffered while in custody. "There were multiple bruises all over his body," he said. "There were cigarette burns behind his ears. He was beaten with metal rods. His eyes were swollen. They have assigned two medical doctors ... to provide him with treatment in order to hide the evidence of torture." Al-Zaidi's brother said his jailers periodically demanded he "confess" that he had been ordered to commit the act by enemies of the prime minister, but that a letter to the prime minister written by him from jail expressing regret for the attack was not said to have been ordered. Maliki reiterated that Zaidi's television station should renounce the act of al-Zaidi, and also suggested, without providing any names, that "a person urged him to commit this act, and this person is known to us as a person who beheads people". U.S. Secretary of State Condoleezza Rice argued that Iraq is a democracy and that "history always shows these things differently than today’s news." An Iranian deputy minister called for al-Zaidi's release.
- On 22 December 2008, al-Zaidi's lawyer Dhiya'a al-Sa'adi also confirmed that al-Zaidi had been beaten and that al-Zaidi said he would never apologize to President Bush. Abdulsattar al-Berikdar, a spokesman of the Iraqi Supreme Judicial Council, said the court was not investigating allegations of torture because al-Zaidi did not ask to be "submitted to a medical committee and did not tell the judge that he was tortured or register a complaint against anyone." Hajar Smouni, a spokesperson for Doha Center for Media Freedom in Qatar, argued that al-Zaidi should be given access to medical care and a fair trial. Smouni said it was positive he met a lawyer, but said it is worrying "that he is to be tried at the Central Criminal Court of Iraq, because that is a court used to try terrorism suspects".
- On 23 December 2008, the Iraqi Parliament accepted the resignation of its speaker, Mahmoud al-Mashhadani. Part of the controversy for his resignation began with his refusing to allow discussion of the fate of Muntadhar al-Zaidi. The speaker described al-Zaidi as "the pride" of Iraq and said that his "best friends" were currently being detained by the United States military for ties to the insurgency. "I weep for the state of Iraq," he told the Iraqi Parliament in his resignation.
- On 16 January 2009, al-Zaidi's brother visited him for 2 hours and Iraqi prison guards threw him a surprise birthday party.
- On 19 January 2009, the Swiss newspaper Tribune de Geneve reported that al-Zaidi was seeking political asylum in Switzerland, where his lawyer said he might work as a journalist at the United Nations.
- On 28 January 2009, Muntadhar al-Zaidi cast his vote from prison.
- On 29 January 2009, A monument of a shoe was erected in honor of Muntadhar al-Zaidi in an orphanage in Tikrit. The orphans helped to build the structure.
- On 30 January 2009, the monument that was erected in honor of Muntadhar al-Zaidi was taken down after requests from the central government. Iraqi police visited the location to make sure that the shoe monument was removed. "We will not allow anyone to use the government facilities and buildings for political motives," Abdullah Jabara, deputy governor of Salaheddin argued. Faten Abdulqader al-Naseri, the orphanage director, said "Those orphans who helped the sculptor in building this monument were the victims of Bush's war. The shoe monument is a gift to the next generation to remember the heroic action by the journalist."
- On 19 February 2009, al-Zaidi told the Baghdad Central Criminal Court that he acted spontaneously after listening to Bush praise the "achievements" made in Iraq: "While he was talking, I was looking at all his achievements in my mind. More than a million killed, the destruction and humiliation of mosques, violations against Iraqi women, attacking Iraqis every day and every hour. A whole people are saddened because of his policy, and he was talking with a smile on his face – and he was joking with the prime minister and saying he was going to have dinner with him after the press conference. Believe me, I didn't see anything around me except Bush. I was blind to anything else. I felt the blood of the innocent people bleeding from beneath his feet and he was smiling in that way. And then he was going to have a dinner, after he destroyed one million martyrs, after he destroyed the country. So I reacted to this feeling by throwing my shoes. I couldn't stop the reaction inside me. It was spontaneous."
- On 20 February 2009, al-Zaidi received a 90-minute trial by the Central Criminal Court of Iraq.
- On 12 March 2009, he was sentenced to three years in prison for assaulting a foreign head of state during an official visit.
- On 7 April, the sentence was reduced to one year from three years.
- On 15 September 2009, he was released for good behavior, after serving nine months of the sentence.

== Trial and sentence ==
Al-Zaidi appeared before a judge on 16 December 2008, and admitted "aggression against a president". The court decided to keep him in custody. A spokesman for the Iraqi court said that al-Zaidi would face charges of attacking a head of state. Dheyaa al-Saadi, the head of the Iraqi Bar Association and one of its most high-profile attorneys, said that he had volunteered to defend al-Zaidi. Judge Dhiya al-Kenani said the court had refused the journalist's request for bail "for the sake of the investigation and for his own security". According to Abdul Satar Birqadr, spokesman for Iraq's High Judicial Council, al-Zaidi is charged with "assaulting a foreign head of state visiting Iraq."

On 30 December 2008, an Iraqi court said al-Zaidi's trial had been postponed pending an appeal over whether the incident amounted to assault or only insulting a foreign leader. A charge of assault would carry a maximum sentence of 15 years, while charges of insulting a foreign leader carry a maximum sentence of only 3 years. One of al-Zaidi's lawyers said he expected a lengthy trial and a sentence of no less than three years if al-Zaidi is convicted. Dhargham al-Zaidi, said his family would turn to an international court if they found the Iraqi jurisdiction system "biased and unfair." In January 2009, al-Zaidi's lawyers petitioned Swiss authorities for political asylum, arguing that his life is at risk in Iraq.

The trial began before the Central Criminal Court of Iraq on 20 February 2009, which only lasted 90 minutes before being recessed. In testimony before the court, al-Zaidi described his growing frustration as Bush spoke about his victories and achievement at the press conference where the shoe was thrown. As Bush listed the gains made in Iraq during the mid-December news conference, al-Zaidi said he was thinking about the sanctity of mosques being violated, the rape of women, and daily humiliations. Al-Zaidi said Bush's "bloodless and soulless smile" and his joking banter provoked him. "I don't know what accomplishments he was talking about. The accomplishments I could see were the more than 1 million martyrs and a sea of blood. There are more than 5 million Iraqi orphans because of the occupation.... More than a million widows and more than 3 million displaced because of the occupation." al-Zaidi said. "I wanted to restore the pride of the Iraqis in any way possible, apart from using weapons." al-Zaidi said he was tortured, beaten and given electric shocks during his interrogation. Supporters who rallied in front of the court said al-Zaidi should be praised for standing up to Bush rather than punished for his actions. The trial resumed briefly on 12 March 2009, after which sentence was imposed.

=== Sentencing ===
On 12 March 2009, al-Zaidi was sentenced to three years of prison for assaulting a foreign leader. The law under which he was charged carried a maximum sentence of 15 years in prison for assaulting a visiting head of state during an official visit. His lawyers indicated they expect to appeal the sentence. Dhia Al Saadi, the head of Zaidi's defense team and the Iraqi Lawyers Syndicate, argued that "the court sessions should be made public according to the Iraqi penalties law". "This sentence is harsh and is not in harmony with the law, and eventually the defense team will contest this in the appeals court," Dhia Al Saadi further said. Court spokesman Abdul-Sattar Bayrkdar said al-Zaidi received the minimum prison sentence possible, given the Saddam Hussein-era law he was charged under, and that al-Zaidi could appeal the court's decision.

Upon reading of the sentence, al-Zaidi shouted "long live Iraq." "This judiciary is not just," al-Zaidi's brother Dargham said. Zaidi's sister shouted "Down with Maliki, the agent of the Americans." Zaidi's brother Uday said he scorns "those who say Iraqi justice is independent" and that the "court was set up according to Paul Bremer decisions." Several family members screamed: "It's an American court... sons of dogs." The family said they would not only appeal but also press ahead with plans to bring torture charges against Bush, Maliki and his bodyguards at a human rights court abroad.

A poll of Iraqis suggested 62 percent of Iraqis regarded al-Zaidi as a "hero". Maha al-Dori, an Iraqi parliament member, said he felt the ruling showed the judges may have been motivated by political concerns. Iraq's Journalistic Freedoms Observatory said "it is now left to wait for a presidential or prime ministerial pardon, because we cannot accept an Iraqi journalist behind bars."

On 7 April 2009, the sentence was reduced to one year from three years. Judge Abdul Sattar al-Beeraqdar, spokesman for Iraq's Higher Judicial Council, said the court reduced al-Zaidi's sentence because he is young and had no previous criminal record. Iraqi Prime Minister Nouri al-Maliki argued al-Zaidi could have faced 15 years in jail or even execution for insulting a visiting head of state.

== Release ==
Defense attorney Karim al-Shujairi said al-Zaidi would be released on 14 September 2009, after spending nine months in jail, he would be freed early for good behavior. He was released on 15 September 2009, claiming that he had been systematically tortured during his time in jail and one of his front teeth was seen missing. Al-Zaidi said that he had been beaten with electric cables and iron bars and immersed in cold water. On 19 October 2009, while in Switzerland where he expected to have medical treatment for his injuries, he stated, "I suffered a great deal. I still have problems with my teeth, back and other parts of my body where I was tortured." Al-Zaidi also declared, "I am free again, but my homeland is still a prison." On 15 September 2009, al-Zaidi stated "I am not a hero, and I admit that ... I am a person with a stance. I saw my country burning."

=== Statements following his release ===
In an interview which aired on Egypt's Dream 2 TV on 12 June 2010, Al-Zaidi stated that it was because of "Bush's bloodthirsty nature" that the former president visited Haiti following a massive earthquake. Al-Zaidi claimed that "Bush did not go there for the sake of human rights or for the victims. He went there because he missed the smell of blood, and the stench of destruction that he wreaked on Iraq. So he went there to get a whiff of that smell, because he is a sick man."

Regarding the election of Barack Obama as President of the United States, Al-Zaidi stated in the same interview that:

We have a saying in Iraqi Arabic – and I'm sure the Egyptian brothers living in Iraq know it. "Away goes a white dog, and along comes a black dog." They are the same, except for the color. Away goes a white US president, and along comes a black president. They are no different.

Following his release, al-Zaidi went to Geneva and announced that he had started creating a humanitarian agency/foundation. The aim of the agency would be to "build orphanages, a children's hospital, and medical and orthopaedic centres offering free treatment and manned by Iraqi doctors and medical staff." His lawyer said that al-Zaidi "hopes to surf on the wave of support he has gained to do some good."

== Parodies ==
After the attacks, the incident was parodied numerous times on the internet. These included online games such as "Sock and Awe" and "Flying Babush", as well as GIFs. Videos of the event went viral on YouTube, with CBS's video of the incident accruing about 12 million views as of October 2026.

The incident is parodied in the music video for Dizzy DROS's "M3a L3echrane", and in the 2012 science fiction comedy film Iron Sky.

== See also ==
- Outline of the Iraq War
- Paul Bremer shoe-throwing incident
- Security incidents involving George W. Bush
