= Put Him in Bucca =

Iraqi prank television program

Put Him in Bucca was an Iraqi television program airing on the network Al-Baghdadia TV. It was hosted by Ali al-Khalidi. The show's name is a reference to Camp Bucca, an American-built detention facility near Umm Qasr that was in operation from 2003 until 2009.

The program, which has been compared to Punk'd and Candid Camera, featured celebrities such as actress Asia Kamal and comedian Jassim Sharaf, who were ostensibly invited to the headquarters of al-Baghdadia for an interview. While the celebrities were en route, fake bombs were placed in their cars, without their knowledge. They were then stopped at an apparent military checkpoint, by soldiers in on the prank, who "discovered" the fake bomb and accused the celebrity of being a terrorist or suicide bomber. The soldiers then threatened the celebrity with detention and execution unless he or she told what he or she knew, while a hidden camera filmed the celebrity's reaction.

The show was produced with the permission of Baghdad Operations Command, the authority in charge of the capital's security, who was approached with the concept by al-Baghdadia. After becoming aware of the ruse, all celebrities who appeared on the show gave their consent for the footage of them to be broadcast.

Many complaints about the show were published in Iraqi newspapers. More than 1,600 people joined a Facebook group called "No to put him in Bucca". As part of a regularly recurring segment on his program Countdown with Keith Olbermann, Keith Olbermann named the producers of Put Him in Bucca as the "Worst People in the World" in one day's broadcast. Producer Najim al-Rubai defended the show, saying, "It's all genuine. That's comedy... We want viewers to laugh about al-Qaida." By laughing at the tactics of the terrorists, he believes, audiences lessen the visceral impact of those tactics.
