= Shoe incident =

- Shoe-banging incident, Nikita Khrushchev at the UN General Assembly held in New York
- Mike Milbury, a Boston Bruin, entered the Madison Square Garden stands on December 23, 1979, disciplining an unruly fan with the fan's own shoe.
- Muntadhar al-Zaidi, George W. Bush shoe throwing incident
- Sheila Dixon, in 1991 Dixon waved her shoe at colleagues on the Baltimore City Council
- Jarnail Singh (born 1973) threw shoe at P. Chidarbram
