= Mutaib =

Mutaib (Arabic: متعب) is a masculine given name of Arabic origin. Notable people with the name are as follows:

- Mutaib Alsaqar (1959–2021), Jordanian singer
- Mutaib bin Abdullah Al Rashid (died 1869), ruler of the Emirate of Jabal Shammar
- Mutaib bin Abdulaziz Al Saud (1931–2019), Saudi royal and politician
- Mutaib bin Abdullah Al Saud (born 1952), Saudi royal, military official and politician
