= U.S.–Iraq Status of Forces Agreement =

Pact signed in 2008

Agreement Between the United States of America and the Republic of Iraq On the Withdrawal of United States Forces from Iraq and the Organization of Their Activities during Their Temporary Presence in Iraq
- Type: Status of Forces Agreement
- Drafted: 16 October 2008
- Signed: 17 November 2008
- Sealed: 14 December 2008
- Expiration: 31 December 2011
- Signatories: Hoshiyar Zebari and Nuri al-Maliki; Ryan Crocker and George W. Bush
- Parties: United States; Iraq
- Ratifiers: Iraqi parliament and Presidency Council of Iraq
- Languages: English; Arabic

The U.S.–Iraq Status of Forces Agreement (official name: Agreement Between the United States of America and the Republic of Iraq On the Withdrawal of United States Forces from Iraq and the Organization of Their Activities during Their Temporary Presence in Iraq) was a status of forces agreement (SOFA) between Iraq and the United States, signed by President George W. Bush in 2008. It established that U.S. combat forces would withdraw from Iraqi cities by June 30, 2009, and all U.S. combat forces will be completely out of Iraq by December 31, 2011. The pact required criminal charges for holding prisoners over 24 hours, and required a warrant for searches of homes and buildings that were not related to combat. U.S. contractors working for U.S. forces would have been subject to Iraqi criminal law, while contractors working for the State Department and other U.S. agencies would retain their immunity. If U.S. forces committed still undecided "major premeditated felonies" while off-duty and off-base, they would have been subjected to an undecided procedures laid out by a joint U.S.-Iraq committee if the U.S. certified the forces were off-duty.

The agreement expired at midnight on December 31, 2011, even though the United States completed its final withdrawal of troops from Iraq on December 16, 2011. The symbolic ceremony in Baghdad officially "cased" (retired) the flag of U.S. forces in Iraq, according to army tradition.

The Iraqi government also approved a Strategic Framework Agreement with the United States, aimed at ensuring international cooperation including minority ethnicity, gender, and belief interests and other constitutional rights; threat deterrence; exchange students; education; and cooperation in the areas of energy development, environmental hygiene, health care, information technology, communications, and law enforcement.

Several groups of Iraqis protested the passing of the SOFA accord as prolonging and legitimizing the occupation, and Grand Ayatollah Ali Husseini al-Sistani expressed concerns with the ratified version. Some other Iraqis expressed skepticism that the U.S. would completely end its presence by 2011. U.S. Secretary of Defense Robert Gates had predicted that after 2011 he would have expected to see "perhaps several tens of thousands of American troops" as part of a residual force in Iraq. Some Americans had discussed "loopholes" and some Iraqis had said they believed parts of the pact remained a "mystery".

== Negotiations ==
American-led Coalition forces participating in the 2003 invasion of Iraq were initially subject to the exclusive jurisdiction of their parent states. After the handover of sovereign power to an Iraqi administration, Coalition forces in Iraq were nominally subject to Iraqi jurisdiction, and operated without any Status of Forces Agreement. In theory, Iraqi Courts had the right to try Coalition forces for any alleged offenses, though this right was never exercised.

In an interview January 24, 2008, US Defense Secretary Robert Gates indicated that work on a SOFA had barely been started. On June 13, 2008, Iraqi Prime Minister Nuri al-Maliki said that negotiations with the United States on a long-term security pact were deadlocked because of concern the deal infringes Iraqi sovereignty. "We have reached an impasse because when we opened these negotiations we did not realize that the U.S. demands would so deeply affect Iraqi sovereignty and this is something we can never accept", he said in Amman, Jordan. "We cannot allow U.S. forces to have the right to jail Iraqis or assume, alone, the responsibility of fighting against terrorism", Maliki told Jordanian newspaper editors, according to a journalist present at the meeting.

On July 1, 2008, Zebari said he briefed members of the Iraqi Parliament that U.S. contractors would no longer have immunity from Iraqi prosecution under negotiated terms of the long-term security pact. U.S. State Department officials could not be immediately reached for comment, but Iraqi member of parliament Mahmoud Othman said he attended the meeting and that Iraqi representatives were very pleased with the immunity agreement.

On July 8, 2008, Grand Ayatollah Ali al-Sistani rejected the proposed agreement on the basis that it violates Iraqi sovereignty, following a meeting with Iraq National Security Advisor Mowaffak al-Rubaie. Rubaie, clarifying remarks by Maliki on July 7 that Iraq would accept a memorandum of understanding in lieu of a SOFA, stated "We will not accept any memorandum of understanding if it does not give a specific date for a complete withdrawal of foreign troops". Deputy speaker Khaled al-Attiyah also said on July 8 that the Iraqi parliament would insist on vetting any agreement with the United States and would likely veto the agreement if American troops were immune from Iraqi law: "Without doubt, if the two sides reach an agreement, this is between two countries, and according to the Iraqi constitution a national agreement must be agreed by parliament by a majority of two thirds".

On October 16, 2008, after several more months of negotiations, U.S. Secretary of Defense Robert Gates and Secretary of State Condoleezza Rice briefed senior U.S. lawmakers on the draft SOFA, and Iraqi Prime Minister Maliki prepared to circulate it with Iraq's Political National Security Council before going on to the Council of Ministers and the Iraqi parliament. Despite a compromise on the issue of jurisdiction over off-duty U.S. troops who commit crimes under Iraqi law, issues related to the timeline for U.S. withdrawal and Iraqi insistence on "absolute sovereignty" remained.

== Approval process ==
On 16 November 2008, Iraq's Cabinet approved the agreements; on 27 November, the Iraqi Parliament ratified them; on December 4, Iraq's presidential council approved the security pacts.

=== Approval by Iraqi Cabinet ===
On November 16, 2008, Iraq's Cabinet approved the agreement, which cited the end of 2009 for the pull out of U.S. troops from Iraqi cities, and 2011 as the fixed deadline for removal of U.S. military presence in country. U.S. concessions involved a ban on U.S. forces searching and raiding homes without Iraqi approval, the right of Iraqis to search shipments of weapons and packages entering the country for U.S. recipients, and the right of Iraq's justice system to prosecute American troops for serious crimes under some circumstances. The vote was passed by 27 of the 37-member cabinet, of which nine members were absent and one opposing. The agreement then went before Parliament. However, on November 19 the Iraqi Parliament was adjourned for a day after lawmakers loyal to Shiite cleric Moqtada al-Sadr shouted down the second reading of the agreement's text. Speaker Mahmoud al-Mashhadani adjourned the session after Sadrist MP Ahmed al-Massoudi aggressively approached a lawmaker from the ruling coalition, who was reading aloud the text of the agreement.

The Aswat al-Iraq news agency reported a mixed reaction among the Iraqi population at large to news of cabinet approval of the agreement. Residents of Sadr City in Baghdad, a stronghold of Muqtada al-Sadr, said they believed the agreement was signed too quickly, while a broader 'vox pop' of Iraqis around the country said they thought the agreement would become a point of contention.

The same day, Secretaries Gates and Rice held classified briefings for U.S. lawmakers behind closed doors, and neither official commented to reporters. Democratic Representative William Delahunt said: "There has been no meaningful consultation with Congress during the negotiations of this agreement and the American people for all intents and purposes have been completely left out". And Oona Hathaway, Professor Law at the University of California at Berkeley called the lack of consultation with United States Congress unprecedented, asserting that aspects of the accord exceed the independent constitutional powers of the president of the United States.

Iraqi Prime Minister Nuri al-Maliki warned Iraq would not seek to extend the UN mandate of U.S. troops and they would pull out immediately if the Iraqi parliament failed to approve a pact. Tariq al Hashimi, the country's Sunni Muslim vice president, complained the U.S. would cease providing many "wide-scale services" if Iraq did not approve the pact. Hashimi said many Iraqis looked "to this attitude as a matter of blackmailing".

=== First signing of the agreement ===
On November 17, 2008, the Iraqi Foreign Minister Hoshiyar Zebari and U.S. ambassador Ryan Crocker signed the agreement in an official ceremony.

=== Ratification by Iraqi Parliament ===
On November 27, 2008, the Iraqi Parliament ratified a Status of Forces Agreement with the United States, establishing that U.S. combat forces will withdraw from Iraqi cities by June 30, 2009, and all U.S. forces will be completely out of Iraq by December 31, 2011, but allowing for further negotiation if the Iraqi Prime Minister believes Iraq is not stable enough. The pact requires criminal charges for holding prisoners over 24 hours, and requires a warrant for searches of homes and buildings that are not related to combat. U.S. contractors will be subject to Iraqi criminal law. If U.S. forces commit still undecided "major premeditated felonies" while off-duty and off-base, they will be subject to the still undecided procedures laid out by a joint U.S.-Iraq committee if the U.S. certifies the forces were off-duty. A referendum of Iraqis will be held in mid-2009 on the pact, which may require Coalition forces to leave by the middle of 2010. Parliament also passed another U.S.-Iraqi bilateral pact called the Strategic Framework Agreement, aimed at ensuring minority Sunni interests and constitutional rights.

In Iraq's Parliament, the pact was supported by 149 of 275 members (~54%) from SCIRI, Dawa, the two Kurdish parties and members of the Sunni-based Iraqi Accord Front. The pact was opposed by 35 members, mostly from the Sadrist bloc. 91 members did not vote, fearing for their future if they said yes, others fearing the same if they said no.

=== Approval by Presidency Council ===
The Presidency Council of Iraq consists of one President and two deputies, or Vice-Presidents. The Council currently consists of Kurdish President Jalal Talabani, Shi'a Vice President Adel Abdul Mahdi, and Sunni Vice President Tariq Al-Hashimi. The Council must agree to all decisions unanimously.

On December 4, 2008, Iraq's presidential council approved the security pact. "Nothing has been changed (in the accord)", presidency secretary Nasir al-Ani said after it was reviewed by the body. The council decision marks the final hurdle for the pact in terms of Iraqi government or legislative approval.

== Reaction to approval ==
=== United States ===
Some anonymous U.S. officials and specialists who follow the war have argued they believe that parts of the agreement may be circumvented and that other parts may be open to interpretation, including: the parts giving Iraqi legal jurisdiction over United States soldiers who commit crimes off base and off duty, the part requiring for US troops to obtain Iraqi permission for all military operations, and the part banning the United States from staging attacks on other countries from Iraq. For example, administration officials have argued that Iraqi prosecution of U.S. soldiers could take three years, by which time the U.S. will have withdrawn from Iraq under the terms of the agreement. In the interim, U.S. troops will remain under the jurisdiction of America's Uniform Code of Military Justice. Michael E. O'Hanlon, of the Brookings Institution research group, said there are "these areas that are not as clear cut as the Iraqis would like to think."

U.S. President George W. Bush hailed the passing of the agreement between the two countries. "The Security Agreement addresses our presence, activities, and withdrawal from Iraq", Bush said. He continued that "two years ago, this day seemed unlikely—but the success of the surge and the courage of the Iraqi people set the conditions for these two agreements to be negotiated and approved by the Iraqi parliament". NOTE: this link takes you to a link that no longer links to the actual documents.

Army planners have privately acknowledged they are examining projections that could see the number of Americans hovering between 30,000 and 50,000, but may be as high as 70,000, for a substantial time beyond 2011. Pentagon planners say those currently counted as combat troops could be "re-missioned" and that their efforts could be redefined as training and support for the Iraqis. Joint Chiefs Chairman Adm. Mike Mullen has also said "three years is a long time. Conditions could change in that period of time".

In a letter to U.S. military personnel about new rules of engagement, Gen. Ray Odierno said that U.S. forces would reduce their visibility but that this does not mean "any reduction in our fundamental ability to protect ourselves". Odierno wrote that U.S. forces would coordinate "operations with the approval of the GoI (Government of Iraq), and we will conduct all operations by, with, and through the Iraqi Security Forces. ... Despite some adjustments to the way we conduct operations, the agreement simply reinforces transitions that are already underway, and I want to emphasize that our overarching principles remain the same", he further wrote.

General Raymond Odierno said that some U.S. forces would remain at local security stations as training and mentoring teams past the June 2009 deadline specified in the status of forces agreement. In contrast, Robert Gates estimated U.S. troops will be "out of cities and populated areas" by June 30. "That's the point at which we will have turned over all 18 provinces to provincial Iraqi control", he predicted. A spokesman for Odierno, Lt. Col. James Hutton, reiterated that the soldiers staying in cities would not be combat forces but rather "enablers," who would provide services such as medical care, air-traffic control and helicopter support that the Iraqis cannot perform themselves. Odierno's comments sparked outrage among some Iraqi lawmakers who say the United States is paving the way for breaching the interim agreement.

When asked by Charlie Rose in a PBS interview how big the American "residual" force would be in Iraq after 2011, Secretary of Defense Gates replied that although the mission would change, "my guess is that you're looking at perhaps several tens of thousands of American troops".

=== Iraq ===
To protest an agreement they saw as prolonging a "humiliating" occupation, tens of thousands of Iraqis burned an effigy of George W. Bush in a central Baghdad square where U.S. troops and Iraqi citizens five years previously tore down of a statue of Saddam Hussein. The Iraqi parliament was the scene of many protests before and during the vote.

After the deal passed, over 9,000 Iraqis gathered to protest in Baghdad's eastern suburb of Sadr City. Protesters burned a U.S. flag and held banners reading: "No, no to the agreement". "We condemn the agreement and we reject it, just as we condemn all injustice", Sheikh Hassan al-Husseini told worshippers right after the vote at the weekly Friday prayers in Baghdad. Iraqi theologian, political, and militia leader Muqtada al-Sadr called for three days of peaceful protests and mourning after the passing of the agreement. Grand Ayatollah Ali Husseini al-Sistani's expressed concerns with the ratified version of the pact and noted that the government of Iraq has no authority to control the transfer of US forces into and out of Iraq, no control of shipments, and that the pact grants US troops immunity from prosecution in Iraqi courts. He said that Iraqi rule in the country is not complete while the US troops are present, but that ultimately the Iraqi people would judge the pact in a referendum. Sistani considers parts of the agreement "a mystery" and said that the pact provides "no guarantee" that Iraq would regain sovereignty.

On December 3, 2008, about 2,000 Iraqi refugees in Syria staged a protest against the Iraq–U.S. military pact saying that the agreement would place Iraq under US domination. "We denounce the security agreement, a shameful and dishonorable agreement of American occupation", read one banner outside a shop in the mostly Shiite neighborhood where the protest occurred. The Association of Muslim Scholars, a group of Sunni religious leaders in Iraq, accused the Iraqi Accord Front, a party which supported the pact, of "selling Iraq" and also denounced the deal as "legitimising the occupation".

Some other Iraqis expressed skeptical optimism that the United States would completely withdraw troops in three years.

=== International ===
Most foreign troops which were part of the force in Iraq were scheduled to leave by December 31, 2008, with forces from Azerbaijan, Poland, Macedonia, Japan, Bosnia, South Korea, and Georgia leaving. The Iraqi and British governments were negotiating a security agreement reportedly similar to the Iraq-U.S. status of forces agreement. The possibly-informal pact expected the role of British troops to be minimal by the end of 2009. With the British and American military, a small force from two or three other countries was expected to remain.

Iranian judiciary chief Mahmoud Hashemi Shahroudi said, "The Iraqi government has done very well regarding this (security pact)".

According to Syrian officials and academics, the pact posed a risk to Syria's security. "The American presence in Iraq, whether permanent or temporary, threatens Syrian security", said Syrian vice-president Farouq al-Shara. President Bashar al-Assad said that the deal would turn "Iraq into a launch pad for attacking its neighbours instead of supporting them". "The continued US presence in the region, with what Newsweek magazine says is the largest embassy in the world [in Baghdad], means ... it will interfere in all of the region's affairs", said Syrian political analyst Jasim Zakariya. Syria alleged that the United States carried out an air strike in September 2008 on a Syrian village, killing eight civilians.

== Role of Contractors under SOFA ==
U.S. contractors working for U.S. forces will be subject to Iraqi criminal law, while contractors working for the State Department and other U.S. agencies may retain their immunity. "The immunity question, the largest question being talked about, is not addressed in the ... agreement", said Alan Chvotkin, who works on behalf of contractors, including Moyock, N.C.-based Blackwater Worldwide. Chvotkin said he believed Blackwater's guards still have immunity under Decree 17 issued by L. Paul Bremer. Blackwater currently has no license to work in Iraq.

== December 14, 2008 press conference ==
On December 14, 2008, U.S. President George W. Bush signed the security pact with Iraq. In his fourth and final trip to Iraq, the president appeared with Iraq's prime minister and said more work is to be done. During the press conference discussing the signing of the pact with Prime Minister Nuri al-Maliki in his palace in the heavily fortified Green Zone, President Bush dodged two shoes thrown at him from the audience. The man who threw his shoes, Muntadhar al-Zaidi, an Iraqi journalist with Egypt-based al-Baghdadia television network, could be heard yelling in Arabic: "This is a farewell ... you dog!" as he threw his first shoe, and when throwing his second shoe al-Zaidi could be heard yelling: "This is for the widows, the orphans and those who were killed in Iraq!" While pinned on the ground by security personnel, he screamed: "You killed the Iraqis!" As the man's screaming could be heard outside, Bush said "That's what people do in a free society, draw attention to themselves."

Two New York Times reporters described al-Zaidi as having been "embraced around the Arab world". Al-Zaidi found support from thousands of protesters in Iraq and his employer. A statement released by Al-Baghdadia television said, "Al-Baghdadia television demands that the Iraqi authorities immediately release their stringer Muntadhar al-Zaidi, in line with the democracy and freedom of expression that the American authorities promised the Iraqi people". The "vast majority" of viewers of al-Baghdadia TV who telephoned to the station in order to express their opinions said that they approved al-Zaidi's actions.

The government of Prime Minister Nuri Kamal al-Maliki called the shoe throwing "a shameful savage act" and demanded a public apology from Al Baghdadia. "The act damaged the reputation of the Iraqi journalists and journalism in general," a statement said.

== SOFA negotiations ==
Negotiations between the U.S. and Iraq for a new SOFA began in fall 2010. There were late-night meetings at the fortified compound of then Iraqi president, Jalal Talabani, and in video conferences between Baghdad and Washington. In June 2011, diplomats and Iraqi officials said that President Obama had told Prime Minister Maliki that he was prepared to leave up to 10,000 soldiers to continue training and equipping the Iraqi Security Forces (ISF). Mr. Maliki agreed, but said he needed time to line up political allies. Eventually, he gained authorization to continue talks with the U.S. on keeping troops in Iraq. The Iraqi parliament returned from a recess in late November 2011 (shortly before the year-end withdrawal date) because of a concern that remaining U.S. troops would not be granted immunity by Iraqi courts. American field commanders were concerned about the Sadrist response if the troops remained and about Iraqi readiness for a transfer of power.

In August 2011, after debates between the Pentagon, the State Department and the White House, the U.S. settled on the 3,000 to 5,000 troop number. An American official said intelligence assessments stated that Iraq was not at great risk of slipping into chaos in the absence of American forces, which was a factor in the decision.

In October 2011, American officials pressed Iraqi leadership to meet again at President Talabani's compound to discuss the issue. This time the U.S. asked Iraq to take a stand on the question of immunity for troops, hoping to remove what had always been the biggest challenge. However, they misread Iraqi politics and the Iraqi public. The Iraqis were unwilling to accept anything that infringed on their sovereignty.

Iraqi leadership picked up on that sentiment quickly. As a result, they publicly said they would not support legal immunity for any American troops. Some American officials have privately said that pushing for that meeting—in essence forcing the Iraqis to take a public stand on such a controversial matter before working out the politics of presenting it to their constituents and to Parliament—was a severe tactical mistake that ended any possibility of keeping American troops past December 2011.

After the pull out was announced, White House aides said the U.S. would keep its embassy in Baghdad and two consulates. They also said there will be about 4,000–5,000 defense contractors.

== After 2011 ==
U.S. officials said in May 2017, when the defeat of ISIL seemed imminent, that negotiations on a deal with Prime Minister Haider al-Abadi had started "in earnest".

In December 2019, in an official statement about a call with United States Secretary of Defense Mark Esper, caretaker Prime Minister Adil Abd Al-Mahdi referred to "supporting Companied Collation Forces" in the context of a continuation of collaboration against Daesh, to "persuade Daesh's remnant and Iraq stability."

== See also ==
- Council of Representatives of Iraq
- Iraq War
- Iraq-United States relations
- Multinational force in Iraq
- Status of forces agreement
- Withdrawal of U.S. troops from Iraq
- List of United States military installations in Iraq
