= Iraqi Bar Association =

Lawyers association in Iraq

- Type: Bar association
- Region served: Iraq

The Iraqi Bar Association (Arabic: نقابة المحامين العراقيين, also translated in English as Union of Lawyers in Iraq or Iraq's lawyers' union), created in 1933, is the biggest lawyers' association in Iraq, with tens of thousands of members as of 2007. It is a member of the International Bar Association.

== Organisational structure ==
The Iraqi Bar Association is headquartered in Almansour, Baghdad.

Under the "modified practicing law code Number 173 for the year 1965", Iraqi lawyers are not technically obliged to be members of the Iraqi Bar Association, but in practice, obtaining an obligatory lawyer's license is infeasible without membership. Saddam Hussein was a member of the Iraqi Bar Association after taking an examination that was never graded. All members are obliged to subscribe to the Bar Association's newsletter. Members of the Kurdistan Bar Association are allowed to be members of the Iraqi Bar Association and vice versa.

About 38,000 lawyers were members of the Iraqi Bar Association in August 2007, with a men to women ratio of about 70:30. New members status can pass through three "authorisation" levels, A, B and C, requiring coursework and a time delay to progress through the levels.

In principle, every three years, eleven "Bar Association Board Council" members are elected in a one-day election by all members. The President of the association is elected separately from the Board Council. The Bar Association Board consists of the President, his/her Deputy, the Board Council Secretary, the Treasurer and six members of the Board Council.

== Leadership and relations with the Iraqi government ==
In early 2005, Malik Dohan al-Hasan, aged 84 at the time, was president of the Iraqi Bar Association. In June 2005, he became Minister of Justice. He chaired a special commission dealing with compensation for victims of human rights violations during the government of Saddam Hussein and protested against human rights violations in United States prisons in Iraq.

In late 2005 (October), Khamal Hamdoon Mulla Allawi was president of the association when Saadoun Sughaiyer al-Janabi, a lawyer participating in the defence of one of Saddam Hussein's co-accused, was assassinated. The association called for a boycott of the Saddam Hussein legal trials in protest. Khamal Hamdoon stated, "Protecting lawyers will be possible only if the killers are caught and put behind bars".

In March 2006, the Iraqi government dismissed the association's council. The "chairman" of the Iraqi Bar Association, Dheyaa al-Saadi, criticised this, arguing that the council had been created as the result of "free and fair elections". He said that the association included members of "divergent political factions and groups" and should "remain a symbol of Iraq's unity" rather than being "politicized". He claimed that the association was one of the "few" organisations in Iraq that was defending "civil and political rights and [guaranteeing] the rule of law".

In June 2006, as "head" of the Iraqi Bar Association, Khamal Hamdoon stated that Iraqi lawyers were "living in terror" and claimed that in its occupation of Iraq, the United States "adopted the law of power and not the power of law. The lawyer's job is that of civilization."

On November 16, 2006, al-Saadi was elected as president of the association with about 70% of the votes. The De-Ba'athification Commission annulled his election on the grounds that he had previously been a member of the Baath Party.

Dheya al-Saadi was apparently still president of the Iraqi Bar Association when in December 2008 he led a team of lawyers to defend Muntadhar al-Zaidi, an Iraqi broadcast journalist working for al-Baghdadia TV who threw his shoes at U.S. president George W. Bush, stating that he did it on behalf of "the widows and orphans and all those killed in Iraq".
