= Mutaib Alsaqar =

Jordanian singer (1959–2021)

- Also known as: Voice of Jordan
- Born: 22 January 1959; Ar-Ramtha, Irbid, Jordan
- Origin: Ar-Ramtha, Irbid, Jordan
- Died: 24 April 2021 (aged 62) Irbid
- Occupations: Singer, Songwriter
- Years active: 1999–2019

Mutaib Al-Saqqar (22 January 1959 – 24 April 2021) was a Jordanian singer. He was famous for performing traditional and patriotic songs.

== Biography and career ==
Alsaqar's career started in the late 1990s when he gained great acclaim after releasing the song “Hala Ya Wasit Albait”, written by poet Habib Al-Zeyoudi, at the beginning of His Majesty King Abdullah II's reign.

Alsaqar released many songs about the Jordan national football team, as well as songs in the Jordanian musical tradition. He participated in many national operettas and festivals, including Jerash Festival, Fuheis Festival, and Amman Festival. Alsaqar performed a number of concerts for Jordanian communities in the Gulf Arab states. He collaborated with Jordanian artists Amal Shibli, Nahawand, and Diana Karazon.

His most famous song was "Qundarat al-Malayeen," a tribute to Muntadhar al-Zaidi, who threw his shoes at former US President George W. Bush in 2008.

== Songs ==
- "Hala Ya Wasit Ahl al-Bait"
- "'Ala al-Minasa"
- "Amrana ya Hathi al-Balad"
- "Ya Malakuna al-Ghali"
- "Tibruq wa Tir'ud"
- "Muhannad wa Lamis"
- "Ya Linashama"
- "Ibshir"
- "Rawb al-Najah"
- "Kuluna Muath" (about Jordanian pilot Muath al-Kasasbeh)
- "Um al-Shaheed"
- "Sheikh al-Fursan"
- "Nawayna ala al-Farah"
- "Egal al Izz"
- "Wain ya Hilo"
- "Ya Huma Lally"
- "Lahon wa Bas" (produced by Fahad Fayiz al-Alma)

== Death ==
Mutaib Al-Saqqar died in Amman on 24 April 2021, during at the "King Abdullah University Hospital" in Ramtha District. His foot was amputated due to the effects of diabetes. A video clip was published in February of him on a hospital bed. He said in press statements that he had suffered greatly due to the COVID-19 pandemic in Jordan crisis that affected his livelihood, and as a result of the message Crown Prince Hussein bore the cost of treatment at the expense of the royal court. He was also suffering from kidney failure and was undergoing hemodialysis operations. He was buried in the Jazura cemetery in Ar-Ramtha.

There was speculation that the cause of death was suicide after he fell from the second floor in Al-Hussein Medical City in Amman. Or that he fell our the window because he lost his balance due to the effects of his treatments and the fact that his bed was near the window.
