= Dheyaa al-Saadi =

Iraqi lawyer

Dheyaa al-Saadi (transliterations include also Dhiyaa) is an Iraqi lawyer. As leader of the Iraqi Bar Association, he protested against the Iraqi government's dissolution of the association's elected council in March 2006. In December 2008, he became the head of the legal team chosen by al-Baghdadia TV to defend Muntadhar al-Zaidi, an Iraqi broadcast journalist working for al-Baghdadia who was detained for throwing his shoes at U.S. president George W. Bush on December 14, 2008.

== Iraqi Bar Association ==
In October 2005, in his role as a "senior official" in the Iraqi Bar Association, al-Saadi criticised the assassination of Saadoun Sughaiyer al-Janabi, a lawyer participating in the defence of one of Saddam Hussein's co-accused, stating "This will have grave repercussions. This will hinder lawyers from defending those held for political reasons."

In March 2006, in his role as chairman of the Iraqi Bar Association, al-Saadi criticised the Iraqi government's dismissal of the association's council, arguing that the council had been created as the result of "free and fair elections". He said that the association included members of "divergent political factions and groups" and should "remain a symbol of Iraq's unity" rather than being "politicized". He claimed that the association was one of the "few" organisations in Iraq that was defending "civil and political rights and [guaranteeing] the rule of law". On November 16, 2006, al-Saadi was elected as president of the association with about 70% of the votes. The De-Ba'athification Commission annulled his election on the grounds that he had previously been a member of the Baath Party.

== Defence of al-Zaidi ==
On December 14, 2008, an Iraqi broadcast journalist working for al-Baghdadia TV, Muntadhar al-Zaidi, threw his shoes at U.S. president George W. Bush and stated that this was on behalf of "the widows and orphans and all those killed in Iraq". He was detained by security forces. Al-Baghdadia organised a team of lawyers headed by al-Saadi to provide al-Zaidi's legal defence. On December 21, al-Saadi contacted Agence France Presse about his client's case. He said that al-Zaidi had filed a complaint against the security forces who allegedly assaulted him during the hours following his arrest and that medical evidence established the nature of al-Zaidi's injuries. On December 22, al-Saadi stated that al-Zaidi is accused of "aggression against a foreign head of state during an official visit", for which the penalty is between 5 and 15 years' imprisonment. He stated that he would demand a reduction to a lesser charge, since "the act was an insult, not an aggression".
