= Dmitry Borshch =

Russian-American artist (born 1973)

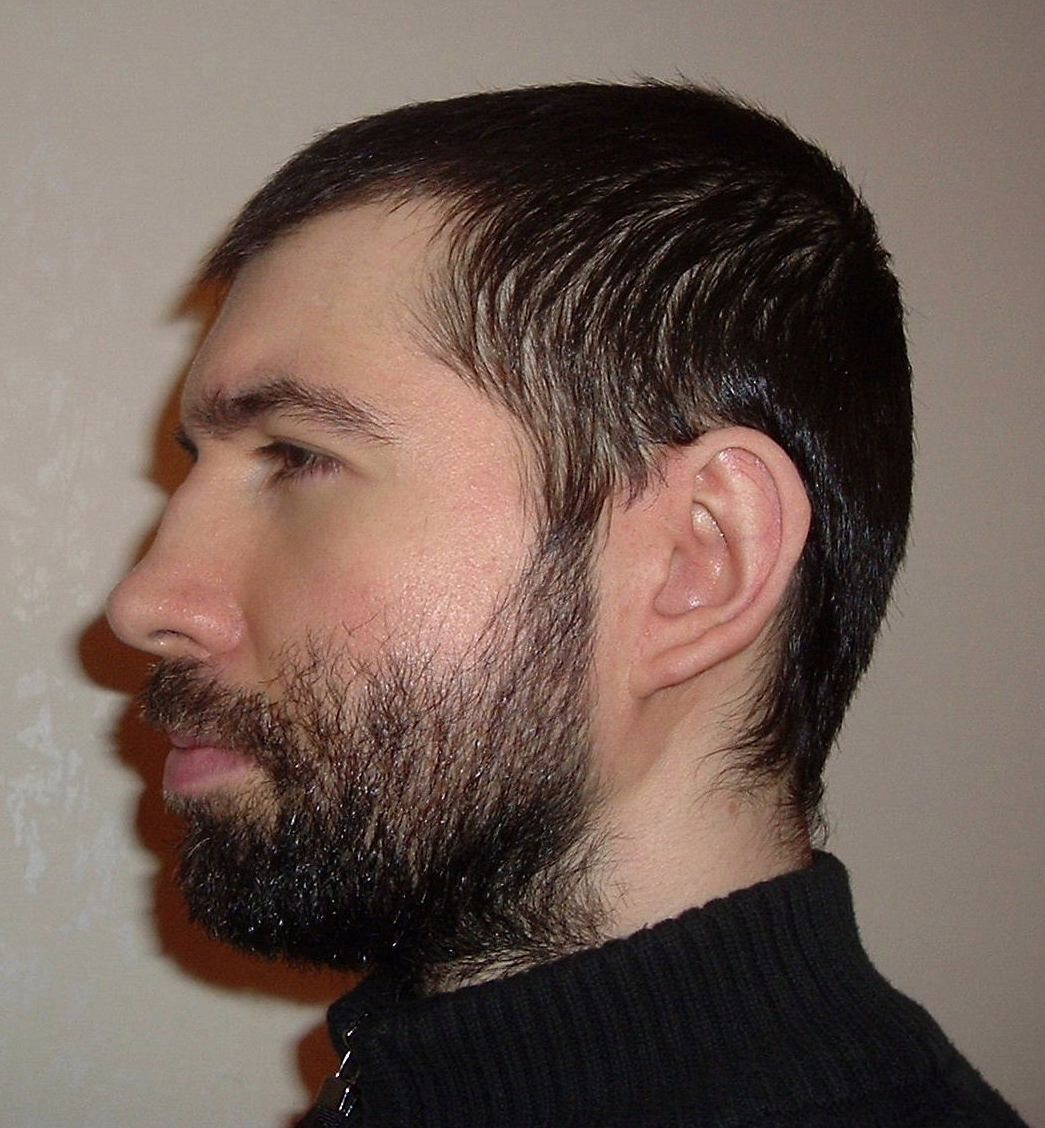
Borshch in 2010

Dmitry Gennadievich Borshch (Russian: Дмитрий Геннадиевич Борщ; born 21 March 1973) is a Russian-American artist known for his minimalistic, surrealist style. He has drawn portraits of several notable figures, including Henry Kissinger and Ed Koch.

== Early life ==
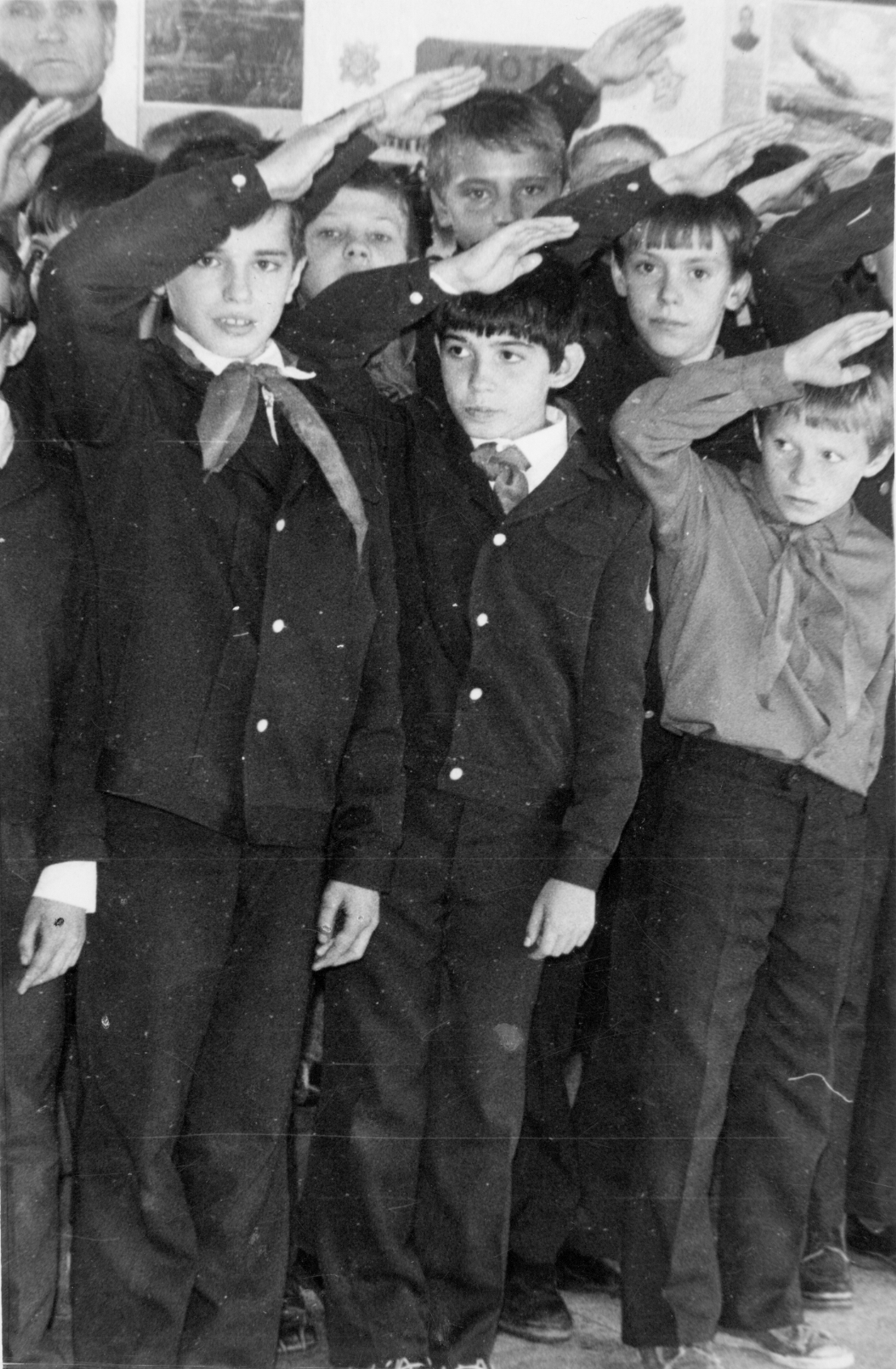
Borshch (center) in 1985 as a member of the Young Pioneer Organization of the Soviet Union

Borshch was born in Dnipropetrovsk, Ukrainian SSR, and studied in Moscow. Borshch described Dnipropetrovsk and Soviet Moscow as "bleak", with his background in the countries playing a role in his work. In 1989, Borshch fled to the United States as a political refugee due to turmoil within the Soviet Union. He currently lives in New York, and describes himself as American or Russian-American.

== Career ==
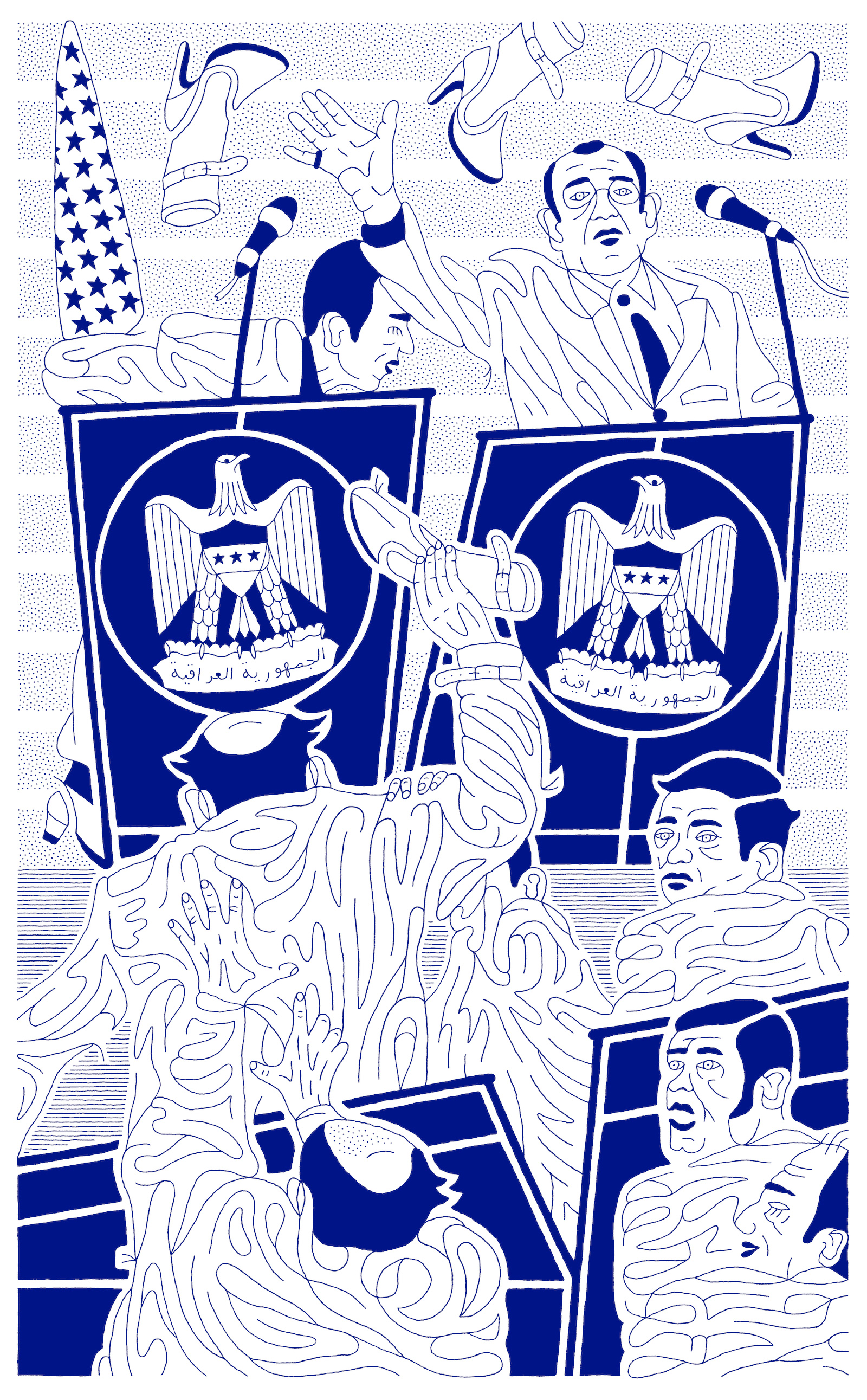
"Bush-Maliki News Conference. Baghdad, December 2008" 2009 by Dmitry Borshch

Borshch is known for his minimalistic artwork, which have been interpreted as a homage to Soviet paradigms. Borshch accepts labelling his work as "Soviet nonconformist pictures", stating, "I would accept the label. USSR is no more but my art still lives there, 'nonconforming' to the state's cultural dictates and proscriptions." Borshch typically draws in blue ink against a white background, however has on occasion used different colors, such as red ink in Odalisque, currently in the collection of the Museum of Modern Art. His works have been exhibited at the Russian Cultural Center, HIAS, the Lydia Schukina Institute of Psychology in Moscow, and the Museums of Contemporary Art in Poltava and Lviv.

=== Works ===
One of Borshch's most recognizable works is "Bush-Maliki News Conference. Baghdad, December 2008", a drawing of the George W. Bush shoe-throwing incident that has been exhibited at the Institute of Oriental Studies of the Russian Academy of Sciences, DePaul University, Brecht Forum and is included in the Catalog of American Portraits, maintained by the Smithsonian's National Portrait Gallery.
