= Khalil al-Duleimi =

Iraqi lawyer

Khalil al-Duleimi is an Iraqi attorney best known for representing Saddam Hussein at his trial.

== Representing Saddam Hussein ==
He was one of 22 lawyers representing Hussein at his trial, and the only one based in Iraq. When Saddam's legal team learned that Saddam was to be interrogated, they requested the presence of a lawyer. Al-Duleimi represented Saddam, and told the head of the legal team, Jordan-based lawyer Ziad al-Khasawneh, that Saddam had answered the tribunal with "confidence and serenity". Al-Duleimi has spent significant time in hiding since his meeting with Saddam, as he received numerous death threats, including a message to his home warning that suicide cells had been formed specifically to kill him as an example to all other attorneys who had volunteered for Saddam's defense team. In May 2005, upon release of photos showing Saddam sleeping and washing his trousers, by an anonymous US Army officer, al-Duleimi made comments critical of the United States Army, but did not comment on a possible lawsuit proposed by al-Khasawneh.

On August 8, 2005, Saddam's family dissolved the remainder of the legal team and appointed al-Duleimi as sole legal counsel.

In a June 2006 interview with Malcolm Beith of Newsweek, al-Duleimi announced his intention to write a book about his client, in which he would "tell the truth." "My memoirs will contain all the facts, and I will reveal many details that will serve justice and the truth," he told the Newsweek reporter. In February 2007, al-Duleimi officially re-iterated those plans to write a book about the "many secrets" his client Saddam Hussein revealed to him during their 140 interviews. The secrets are purportedly about the fall of Baghdad and Saddam's imprisonment. Al-Duleimi also promised to reprint as many as 300 personal letters, poems and other miscellaneous works written by Saddam. The book, according to al-Duleimi, could be out in as little as one year. At the time of his announcement, al-Duleimi had not yet found a publisher.

== Other cases ==
In December 2008, Muntadhar al-Zaidi, an Iraqi broadcast journalist who was under detention for throwing his shoes at U.S. president George W. Bush on December 14, 2008, refused al-Duleimi's offer to defend him legally.
