= Ali al-Khalidi =

Iraqi television host, journalist and media personality (born 1988)

Ali al-Khalidi - علي الخالدي
- Born: January 25, 1988 (age 38); Baghdad, Ba'athist Iraq
- Occupations: Television host, journalist, media personality
- Years active: 2008–present

Ali al-Khalidi - علي الخالدي (Arabic: علي الخالدي; January 25, 1988) is an Iraqi television host, journalist and media personality. He works at Al-Baghdadia TV.

== Early life and education ==
Al-Khalidi was born in Basra Governorate.

== Career ==
- "Khln Boka (Program)" on Al-Baghdadia TV 2011
- "Balbala (Program)" on Al-Baghdadia TV 2015
