= Muntadhar al-Zaidi =

Iraqi journalist (born 1979)

- منتظر الزيدي
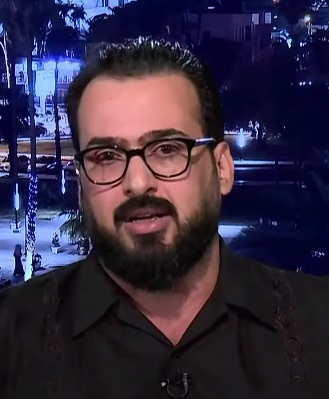
- al-Zaidi in 2020
- Born: 15 January 1979 (age 47); Baghdad, Iraq
- Education: University of Baghdad
- Occupation: Broadcast journalist
- Known for: George W. Bush shoe-throwing incident
- Notable credit: Freelance
- Political party: Alliance Towards Reforms (dissolved 2021)

Muntadhar al-Zaidi (Arabic: منتظر الزيدي, romanized: Muntaẓar az-Zaydī; born 15 January 1979) (Note: Alternative transliterations used in Western media: Muthathar, Muntadhar, Muntadar, Muntazer, Muntader, Muthathi; al-Zeidi) is an Iraqi broadcast journalist who served as a correspondent for Iraqi-owned, Egypt-based Al-Baghdadia TV. As of February 2011, al-Zaidi worked with a Lebanese TV channel.

After the U.S. invasion of Iraq, al-Zaidi became a journalist, and wrote a story on a schoolgirl shot by American forces, who attempted to cover up the incident. Aftwards, on 16 November 2007, al-Zaidi was kidnapped by unknown assailants in Baghdad likely affiliated with the Iraqi government, and arrested by United States Armed Forces. On 14 December 2008, al-Zaidi threw his shoes at U.S. President George W. Bush during a Baghdad press conference while shouting, "This is a farewell kiss from the Iraqi people, you dog." Al-Zaidi suffered injuries as he was taken into custody and some sources said that he was tortured during his initial detention. There were calls throughout the Middle East to place the shoes in an Iraqi museum, but the shoes were later destroyed by U.S. and Iraqi security forces. Al-Zaidi's shoeing inspired many similar incidents of political protest around the world.

Following the incident, al-Zaidi was represented by the head of the Iraqi Bar Association at his trial. On 20 February 2009, al-Zaidi received a 90-minute trial by the Central Criminal Court of Iraq. On 12 March 2009, he was sentenced to three years in prison for assaulting a foreign head of state during an official visit. On 7 April, the sentence was reduced to one year. He was released on 15 September 2009 for good behavior after spending nine months in jail. After his release, al-Zaidi was treated for injuries received in prison and later said he planned to "build orphanages, a children's hospital, and medical and orthopaedic centres offering free treatment and manned by Iraqi doctors and medical staff."

== Biography ==
Muntadhar al-Zaidi was raised in Sadr City, a suburb of Baghdad, Iraq, and his family is of Shia Muslim faith. and unmarried. Disturbed by the violence and disrespect of American soldiers in Baghdad, he feared widespread calamity resulting from the invasion, and to document events he began working as a correspondent for Al-Baghdadia TV in 2005. In 2007, American forces were struck by a car bomb in Baghdad, and began firing indiscriminately into the neighborhood, mortally wounding a schoolgirl named Zahra. Despite intimidation from American soldiers, al-Zaidi interviewed local Iraqis including Zahra's friends, and reported the story. Ahmed Alaa, a close friend and colleague of al-Zaidi at al-Baghdadia television (barred in Iraq 2014), in a talk on Islam Online, refers to "One of [al-Zaidi's] best reports" "on Zahra, a young Iraqi school girl killed by the occupation forces while en route to school." Alaa said al-Zaidi documented the tragedy in his reportage, complete with interviews with her family, neighbors and friends. "This report earned him the respect of many Iraqis and won him many hearts in Iraq," he said. Al-Zaidi once also turned down an offer to work for what he termed "a pro-occupation channel".

Al-Zaizi was kidnapped by unknown assailants in November 2007, likely government forces, in retaliation for his report. Al-Zaidi was then arrested by United States Armed Forces.

Friends said al-Zaidi had been "emotionally influenced" by the destruction that he had seen in his coverage of the US bombing of Sadr City. Muzhir al-Khafaji, al-Zaidi's boss at the TV station, described al-Zaidi as a "proud Arab and an open-minded man." He added, "He has no ties with the former regime. His family was arrested under Saddam's regime." On politics, al-Zaidi said "I'm Iraqi and I'm proud of my country." Friends of al-Zaidi said that he utterly rejected the occupation and the civil clashes. They said he believed the U.S.-Iraq Status of Forces Agreement was a "legalization of the occupation."

Sami Ramadani, a political exile from Saddam's regime and a senior lecturer at London Metropolitan University, wrote in an op-ed for The Guardian that al-Zaidi "reported for al-Baghdadia on the poor and downtrodden victims of the US war. He was first on the scene in Sadr City and wherever people suffered violence or severe deprivation. He not only followed US Apache helicopters' trails of death and destruction, but he was also among the first to report every 'sectarian' atrocity and the bombing of popular market places. He let the victims talk first".

=== Kidnapping and detention ===
After his report documenting the killing of schoolgirl Zahra, on Friday morning, 16 November 2007, al-Zaidi was kidnapped on his way to work in central Baghdad. At this time, U.S. forces often worked to block news reports and reporters covering these kinds of stories. Unknown armed men forced him into a car, where he was beaten until he lost consciousness. The assailants used al-Zaidi's necktie to blindfold him and bound his hands with shoelaces. He was held captive with little food and drink and questioned about his work as a journalist. During his disappearance, al-Zaidi was reported missing by Iraq's Journalistic Freedoms Observatory. On 18 November, Reporters Without Borders expressed deep concern in a statement about al-Zaidi's detention. No ransom demand was made, and al-Zaidi's kidnappers released him, still blindfolded, on to a street three days later at around 3 a.m. on Monday, 19 November 2007, whereafter al-Zaidi's brother picked him up. The United Nations High Commissioner for Refugees mentioned al-Zaidi's kidnapping in a December 2007 report that listed violent incidents in the media, in particular, incidents targeting journalists in Baghdad. According to the report, "journalists and media workers and other professionals continue to be targets for kidnapping and assassination."

After his kidnapping, al-Zaidi told Reuters; "My release is a miracle. I couldn't believe I was still alive." The editor of Al-Baghdadia TV described the kidnapping as an "act of gangs, because all of Muntadhar's reports are moderate and unbiased." Several months later, in January 2008, Al-Zaidi was arrested by the United States armed forces in Iraq, and detained overnight by US troops as they searched his residence. The soldiers later offered him an apology.

== George W. Bush shoeing ==
Video of the incident

During a 14 December 2008 press conference at the prime minister's palace in Baghdad, Iraq, al-Zaidi threw both of his shoes at then-United States president George W. Bush. "This is a farewell kiss from the Iraqi people, you dog," yelled al-Zaidi in Arabic as he threw his first shoe towards Bush. "This is for the widows and orphans and all those killed in Iraq," he shouted as he threw his second shoe. Bush ducked twice to avoid being hit by the shoes. Prime Minister Nuri al-Maliki attempted to catch one of the shoes to protect Bush. Al-Zaidi was pulled to the floor before being grabbed by the prime minister's guards, kicked, and quickly rushed out of the room.

Al-Zaidi was initially held by the prime minister's guards and was later turned over to the Iraqi army's Baghdad command. The command handed him over to the Iraqi judiciary. Hundreds took to the streets to demand his release. Al-Zaidi could have faced charges of insulting a foreign leader and the Iraqi prime minister. A conviction of these charges could have carried a sentence of up to two years in prison or a small fine, although it would have been unlikely to face the maximum penalty given his newfound "cult status" in the Arab world, according to a Middle-East observer. An Iraqi lawyer stated that al-Zaidi was likely to get at least two years in prison if he were prosecuted. Al-Zaidi went before a judge on 17 December. He declined to be represented by Khalil al-Duleimi, who defended the late Iraqi leader Saddam Hussein before his execution, and also said he wanted to be represented by an Iraqi lawyer. "I will introduce myself as his lawyer and demand the case be closed and Muntader be released because he did not commit a crime," said Dheyaa al-Saadi, al-Zaidi's lawyer and head of the Iraqi Bar Association. "He only freely expressed himself to the occupier, and he has such a right according to international law." On the same day, al-Zaidi appeared privately before a judge from within the Green Zone. He was released from jail on 15 September 2009, after serving nine months in prison. He said that he would release the names of those who he said had tortured him, including senior officials in the government and the army. In an interview with Reuters in 2023, al-Zaidi stated that he had never regretted throwing his shoes at President Bush.

== Al-Zaidi humanitarian foundation ==
Following his release, al-Zaidi went to Geneva and announced that he had started creating a humanitarian agency/foundation. The aim of the agency would be to "build orphanages, a children's hospital, and medical and orthopaedic centres offering free treatment and manned by Iraqi doctors and medical staff." His lawyer said that al-Zaidi "hopes to surf on the wave of support he has gained to do some good."

The domain registered for the foundation (al-zaidi.org) expired and was dropped in 2013, and has not shown any activity since.

In 2026, al-Zaidi said in an interview that the primary aim of the organization was "media exposure and advocacy regarding the Iraq War rather than sustained, large-scale infrastructure."

== 2018 Iraqi election ==
Al-Zaidi announced in early 2018 his intent to run for the Iraqi Council of Representatives on Muqtada al-Sadr's Alliance towards Reforms ticket. In an interview with Reuters, he stated that "The main real purpose and reason behind my nomination is to get rid of the corrupt, and to expel them from our country". Zaidi has been critical of US and Iranian involvement in Iraq during his campaigning, expressing a view that "America and Iran are the reasons for the tension in Iraq". During his campaign al-Zaidi sought to criticise US involvement in terms of Iraq's security forces, arguing that; "We have American troops under the name of 'consultants' – we don't accept their presence in Iraq". His electoral bid was unsuccessful.

== Cultural references ==
In January 2009, a "sofa-sized" fibreglass and copper statue of the shoe was erected in Tikrit, with a poem honouring al-Zaidi. The sculptor, Laith al-Amari, described the statue as a "tribute to the pride of the Iraqi people".

== Publications ==
- The Last Salute to President Bush, 2010

== See also ==
- U.S.-Iraq Status of Forces Agreement
