= Mmuseumm =

Micro-museum in New York City

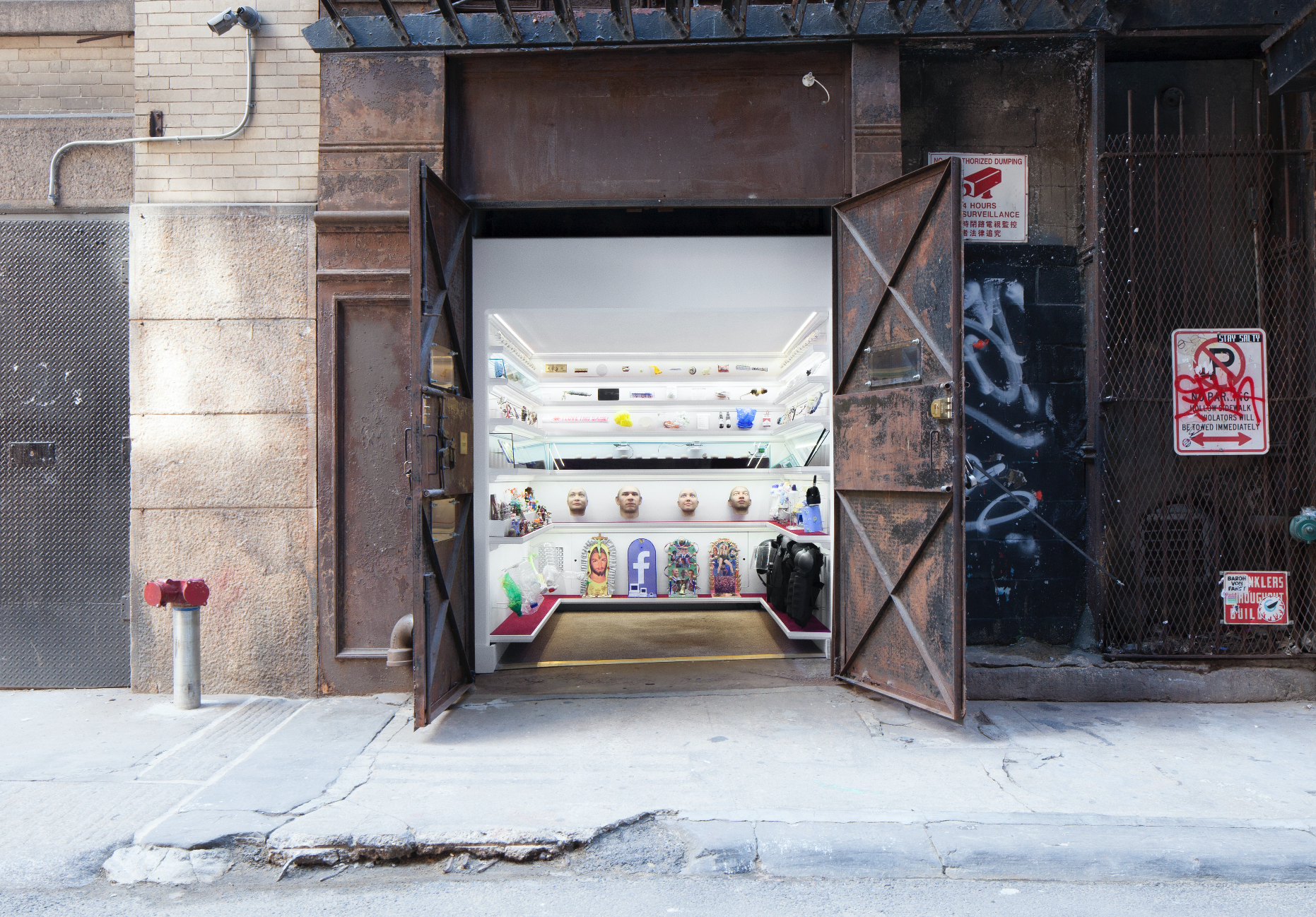
- Mmuseumm exterior with open doors
- Established: 2012
- Location: Cortlandt Alley, Tribeca, Manhattan, New York City
- Coordinates: 40.717406°N 74.002719°W
- Type: Natural history museum
- Founders: Alex Kalman, Safdie brothers
- Website: Official website

Mmuseumm is a modern natural history museum located in Tribeca, Lower Manhattan in New York City. The museum displays contemporary artifacts in a style reminiscent of the historical cabinet of curiosities model.

== History ==
Mmuseumm was founded in 2012 by Alex Kalman and the Safdie brothers.

== Location and space ==
Mmuseumm is located in Cortlandt Alley in Manhattan, between Franklin Street and White Street—a stretch occasionally referred to as "Mmuseumm Alley". The museum's first location, Mmuseumm 1, opened in 2012 inside a former elevator shaft. A second wing, Mmuseumm 2, debuted in 2015 a few doors down.

The museum's total area is approximately 36 sq ft (3.3 m^{2}), and its displays are visible to the public 24 hours a day through peepholes embedded in its doors.

== Concept and exhibitions ==
Mmuseumm is dedicated to the curation and exhibition of contemporary artifacts intended to document and interpret modern life. Its curatorial approach, described as "Object Journalism", presents everyday items in a natural history museum format, often drawing comparisons to historical cabinets of curiosities.

Exhibitions are organized by "seasons", a structure inspired by the museum's original summer operating schedule.

== Gallery ==
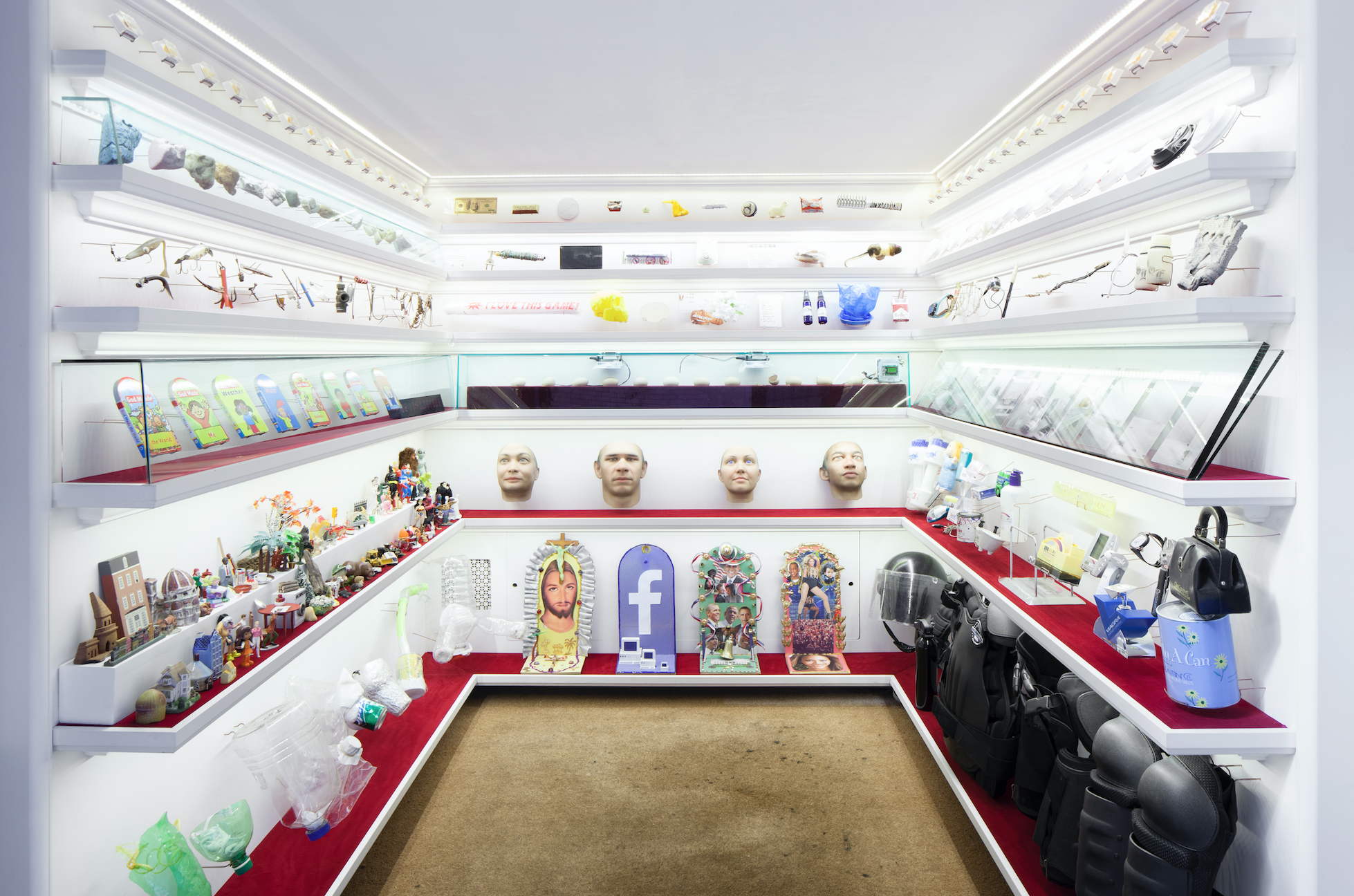
Interior view of Mmuseumm 1, Season 4 (2015)

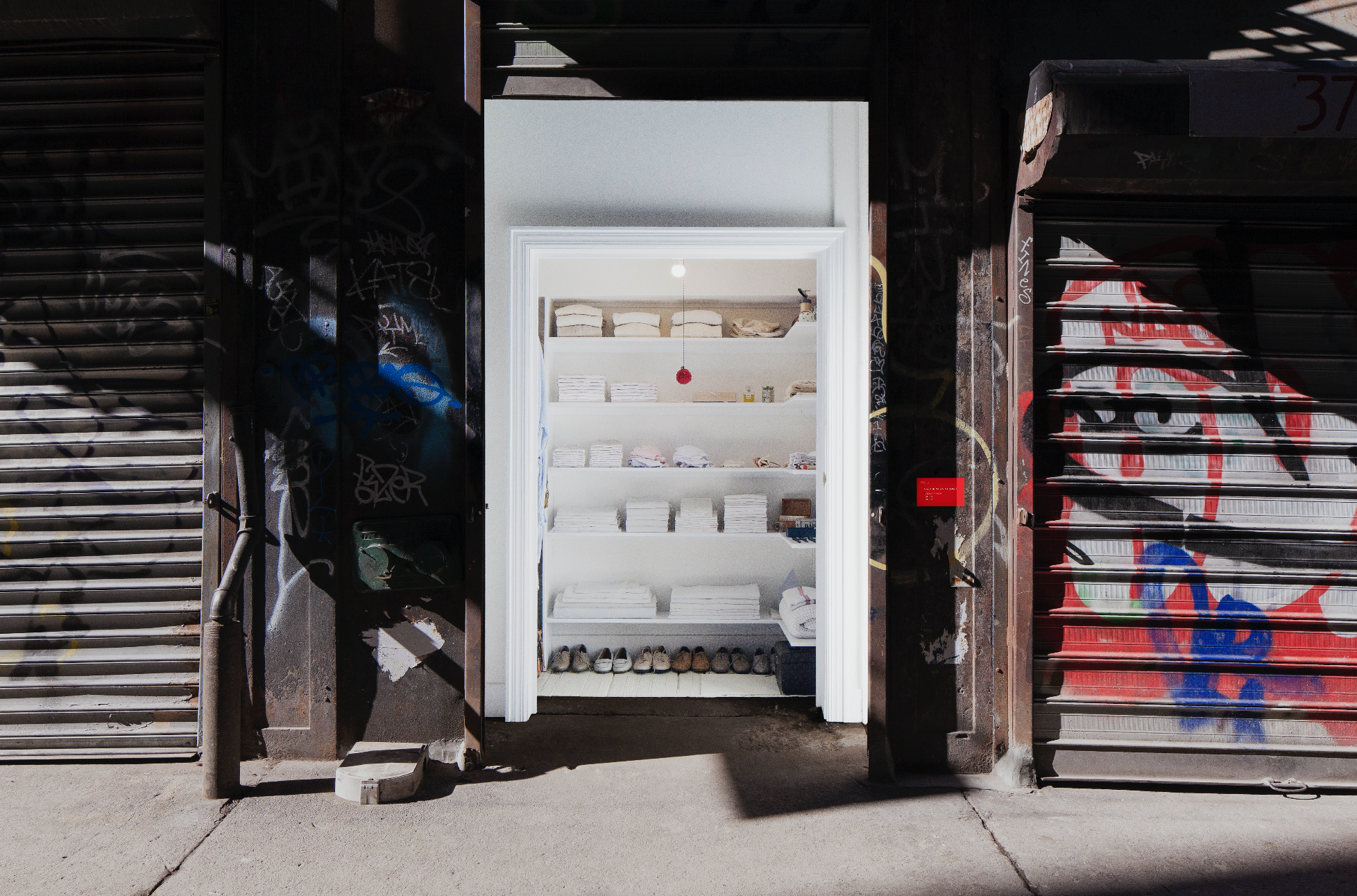
Sara Berman's Closet exhibit at Mmuseumm 2 (2015)
