= Central Criminal Court of Iraq =

The Central Criminal Court of Iraq, or CCCI, is a criminal court of Iraq. The CCCI is based on an inquisitorial system and consists of two chambers: an investigative court and a criminal court. The court was created by the Coalition Provisional Authority in 2003 to handle cases involving serious crimes such as governmental corruption, terrorism and organized crime that were previously handled by governorate level judges in the ordinary criminal courts. Candidates for the judiciary had to be an Iraqi national of high moral character and reputation, a non-member of the Ba'ath Party, demonstrate a "high level of legal competence", and sign an oath of office.

== Criticism ==
There has been criticism of the court, as well as the broader judiciary of Iraq. The New York Times published an investigative article critical of the court, and Human Rights Watch has said that:

The CCCI is the country’s flagship criminal justice institution. Yet it is an institution that is seriously failing to meet international standards of due process and fair trials. Defendants often endure long periods of pretrial detention without judicial review, and are not able to pursue a meaningful defense or challenge evidence against them. Abuse in detention, typically with the aim of extracting confessions, appears common, thus tainting court proceedings in those cases.

The United Nations Assistance Mission in Iraq recommended that the government "review procedures before criminal courts and adopt measures consistent with minimum standards for fair trial; adopt measures to ensure basic rights for defendants, including timely and adequate access to defence counsel, and continuity of representation by counsel at all stages of the proceedings; give consideration to implementing a moratorium on the death penalty pending a thorough review of legal proceedings followed at both pre-trial and trial stages."

== See also ==
- Law of Iraq
- Iraqi Penal Code
- Coalition Provisional Authority
