= List of shoe-throwing incidents =

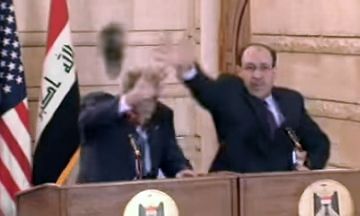
U.S. president George W. Bush ducking a thrown shoe while Iraq prime minister Nouri al-Maliki attempts to parry it

Shoe-throwing showing the sole of one's shoe or using shoes to insult are forms of protest in many parts of the world. Shoe-throwing as an insult dates back to ancient times, being mentioned in verse 10 of Psalm 60 and the similar verse 10 of Psalm 108 in the Old Testament. Modern incidents where shoes were thrown at political figures have taken place in Australia, India, Ireland, Taiwan, Hong Kong, Pakistan, the United Kingdom, the United States, and most notably the Arab world.

Posters of former U.S. president George W. Bush's face have long appeared through the Middle East with shoes attached to them, and some people have called former secretary of state Condoleezza Rice kundara, meaning "shoe". Shoeing received attention after Muntadhar al-Zaidi threw his shoes at then-President Bush in a 14 December 2008 press conference in Baghdad, Iraq. Since the al-Zaidi incident, copycat incidents in Europe, North America, India, China, Iran, Turkey and Australia have been reported.

== Context ==
Shoes are considered unclean, especially in the Arab World.

Matthew Cassel of The Electronic Intifada in the context of the Bush shoeing incident has held the opinion that the Western media overplayed the action's particularly "Arab" character.

== Notable incidents ==
=== 359 ===
- Constantius II, Roman Emperor, was giving a speech from a hillock to a group of Limigantes to ask for their loyalty, when he was hit by a shoe thrown by one of them. The thrower shouted "Marha, marha!" in a "signal of war."

=== 2007 ===
- April 3: Famous writer and legislator Li Ao threw white sneakers being prepared to Su Chen-chang, Premier of Taiwan, to show protest against the previous DPP legislator Wang Shu-hui's shoe-flying against Legislative Yuan President Wang Jin-pyng.

=== 2008 ===
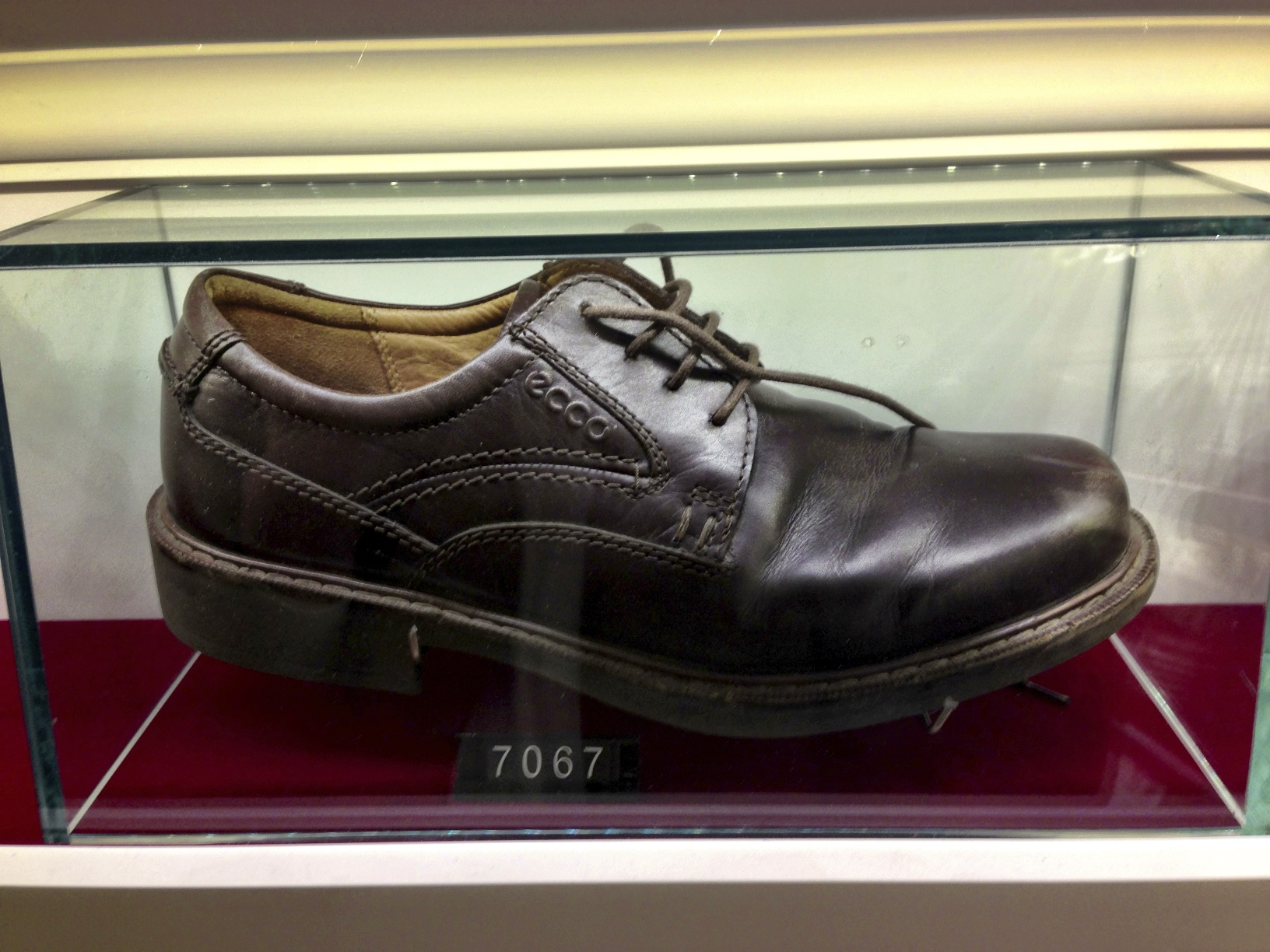
Replica of the shoe thrown at George W. Bush in a New York Museum

- 7 April: Arbab Ghulam Rahim, the former Chief Minister of Sindh, Pakistan, was leaving the back door of the Sindh assembly building after taking oath as a newly elected member when he was hit by a shoe allegedly thrown by Agha Javed Pathan, a worker from the Pakistan Peoples Party.
- 14 December: During a press conference at the prime minister's Palace in Baghdad, Iraq, journalist Muntadhar al-Zaidi threw his shoes at then United States president George W. Bush. "This is a farewell kiss from the Iraqi people, you dog!" yelled al-Zaidi in Arabic as he threw his first shoe towards the U.S. president. "This is for the widows and orphans and all those killed in Iraq!" he shouted as he threw his second shoe. President Bush ducked twice, avoiding being hit by the shoes.
- 17 December: Queens resident and Amtrak employee Stephen Millies, a protester at a meeting of the Metropolitan Transportation Authority (MTA), tried to throw his shoe at the CEO of the MTA with the statement, "This shoe is for you!" Millies managed to shake off his left shoe before being stopped and detained by MTA Police.
- 17 December: The anti-war group Code Pink pelted shoes at an effigy of then-U.S. president George W. Bush outside the White House. Protesters presented their shoes at U.S. embassies around the world to show their support for al-Zaidi.
- 19 December: Ukrainian reporter Ihor Dmitriv pelted a Ukrainian politician with a shoe when Dmitriv became angered by the politician's sexist remarks. Speaking about Ukraine's possible accession to NATO, Oleh Soskin said NATO membership was more favored by the Ukrainian women, as they were "the more intelligent" part of the body politic. Dmitriv said his attack was motivated by the Ukrainian leadership's "craziness" and said "a shoe is going to become a leading means (for common people) to influence their leaders."
- 20 December: Protesters in Montreal and Toronto threw shoes at posters of then-U.S. president George W. Bush in front of their respective U.S. consulates to support Muntadhar al-Zaidi, to demand his immediate release, and to celebrate his gesture. The shoe tosses took place in −24 °C weather during protests against the U.S. military occupations of Iraq and Afghanistan and against Canada's involvement in the U.S.-led war in Afghanistan. At the shoe toss event in Toronto, Ahmed Habib, a refugee from Baghdad, said, "We don't think of Muntadhar al-Zaidi as a criminal but, in fact, we think of him as a hero. The only war criminal is George Bush and his buddy Stephen Harper, so shame on the both of them." At the shoe toss event in Montreal, Québec solidaire leader and MNA Amir Khadir threw his shoes at a picture of President Bush and was later criticized and accused of betraying the "dignity and responsibilities of a[n] MNA."

=== 2009 ===
- 20 January: Protesters in the United States shoed an inflatable replica of George W. Bush in replication of al-Zaidi's shoe-throwing incident.
- 2 February: Chinese Premier Wen Jiabao was in London, speaking with British Prime Minister Gordon Brown about economic cooperation and trade relations between China and the United Kingdom. That day, Wen was scheduled to give the Rede Lecture at the University of Cambridge entitled, "See China in the Light of Her Development". As Wen came to the end of his lecture, a man, later identified as a 27-year-old German national Martin Jahnke, stood from the audience, blew a whistle and shouted, "How can the university prostitute itself with this dictator here? How can you listen to these lies he's telling?" Jahnke then threw his shoe at Wen, although the shoe landed a few feet away. Fellow members of the audience shouted at Jahnke, "Shame on you", as he was escorted out of the auditorium. Jahnke was promptly removed from the lecture by university proctors and then arrested by police on suspicion of breach of the peace and attempted assault. After the shoe was thrown, Premier Wen commented, "this despicable behaviour cannot stand in the way of friendship between China and the UK." University Vice-Chancellor Alison Richard commented, "I deeply regret that a single member of the audience this afternoon failed to show the respect for our speaker that is customary at Cambridge. This university is a place for considered argument and debate, not for shoe-throwing." Premier Wen urged leniency for the German student. "Education is best for a young student, and I hope he will have the opportunity to continue his education. The return of a prodigal is worth more than gold", said the message from Wen, posted on the Foreign Ministry website. A district judge later concluded there was insufficient evidence to prove that Jahnke's behavior had caused harassment, alarm or distress to the Chinese leader or anyone else in the lecture theater. "I didn't want to hit the premier personally. I thought just placing the shoe on the stage would be universally understood. What it was meant to be was a symbolic protest. I didn't intend to hurt people." During his trial, Jahnke's lawyers alleged that his prosecution was being pushed forward under pressure from the Chinese government, and that there had been political interference in the trial, though this accusation was dismissed by the trial judge due to lack of evidence.
- 5 February: Israeli Ambassador to Sweden Benny Dagan was hit by a protester's shoe while speaking about the 2009 Gaza War. The shoe throwers reportedly chanted "Murderer!" and "Intifada!".
- 6 March: During a trip to the city of Urmia, someone threw a shoe at the motorcade of Iranian president Mahmoud Ahmadinejad. People had become angry after the president's convoy hit an elderly man but did not stop. A shoe had previously been thrown at Ahmadinejad at Amir Kabir University in 2006.
- 17 March: Canadian protesters in Calgary used shoes as props during their demonstrations, even going so far as to create a "shoe cannon".
- April: A schoolteacher hurled a slipper at Indian National Congress Lok Sabha candidate Naveen Jindal.
- April: Some shareholders in Fortis bank threw their shoes at executives in Ghent, Belgium, in opposition to the decision to sell part of the bank to BNP Paribas.
- 7 April: India's Home Minister P. Chidambaram was shoed by Jarnail Singh, a Sikh journalist who works at the Hindi daily Dainik Jagaran. Chidamabaram was asked a question by Jarnail Singh on the Central Bureau of Investigation's (CBI) clean chit to Congress leader Jagdish Tytler on the 1984 anti-Sikh riots. He said that CBI was not under the home ministry, and no ministry of the government had put any pressure on the CBI. He said that "It is for the court to accept or reject or ask for further investigation by CBI. Let us wait for the court decision". When Jarnail Singh persisted with his questions, Chidambaram told him "no arguments, you are using this forum". Following this the journalist lobbed his shoe saying 'I protest'. Thrown underhand with little force, the shoe narrowly missed hitting Chidambaram. The action caused a flutter in the hall. Chidambaram responded to the situation in a composed manner and said that the journalist should be removed from the press conference hall gently. Chidambaram said to the reporters, "let not the action of one emotional person hijack the entire press conference. I have answered his questions to the best of my ability." After the incident, Singh said that he was sorry for the method of protest he adopted, but issue is right. He added that he felt upset that the government had not done justice in the anti-Sikh riots. Singh also appealed to journalists and others not to repeat his actions. Asked if he could have used some other manner to protest, "For the last 25 years this has been happening. So what other method is left (to protest)", Jarnail Singh said. Jarnail Singh was let off without any charges on the insistence of Chidambaram. The whole incident set off a major media feeding frenzy with 24x7 TV coverage and snowballed into a major election issue which embarrassed Congress politically. The police said that no complaint was lodged with them, and Chidambaram said that the journalist should be forgiven. A few Sikh bodies came out in Singh's support and even offered rewards. The shoe throwing incident also sparked off widespread protests by Sikhs against the CBI which had given a clean chit to Tytler. After the shoe throwing incident, Congress calculated politically that all the media controversy created could make it lose many seats especially in Punjab. Fearing further controversy, Congress dropped both Tytler and Sajjan Kumar as congress candidates from Lok Sabha 2009 elections.
- 16 April: Indian Leader of Opposition and Prime Ministerial candidate of National Democratic Alliance L K Advani was shoed by his own party member, Pawas Agarwal, a former district vice-president of Bharatiya Janata Party (BJP) Katni Town in Madhya Pradesh.
- 26 April: During an election rally, Indian Prime Minister Manmohan Singh came under a shoe attack in Ahmedabad. A 28-year-old man made an attempt to throw a shoe at Singh while he was addressing the rally. The shoe landed a few meters away from Singh. Soon after the incident took place, the shoe thrower was taken away by police. Singh asked the police not to file any charges. The incident was condemned by the opposition Bharatiya Janata Party and was called an "unestablished way of protesting against democracy."
- 1 October: A student threw a shoe at the director of the International Monetary Fund, Dominique Strauss-Kahn, as he addressed a university in Istanbul, Turkey. The shoe did not hit Strauss-Khan but landed on the stage. The student, Selçuk Özbek, from the left-wing newspaper BirGün, was taken away by security as he shouted "IMF get out!" A female protestor was also escorted from the hall while others shouted, "Go away IMF, you're stealing money."
- 8 October A single shoe was hurled at Clifford May as a protest by a student named Muhammad Hussain, who was also the class representative of his class at Karachi University I.R. Dept. Pakistan.
- 23 October: Supporters of Iranian president Mahmoud Ahmadinejad threw their shoes at opposition leader Mehdi Karroubi as he visited Tehran during the 2009 Iranian election protests. A fight broke out between supporters of Ahmadinejad and Karroubi and one of the Ahmadinejad supporters threw a shoe at Karroubi, which hit him in the face and resulted in his turban falling off.
- November: a shoe was hurled at Gordana Čomić, Vice-President of the National Assembly of Serbia by Serbian Radical Party MP Gordana Pop-Lazić.
- 4 November Former Australian prime minister John Howard was delivering a speech about leadership in the new century at Cambridge University when an Australian student called him a racist before taking off his boot and throwing it in his direction.
- 1 December: Muntadhar al-Zaidi, who first shoed George W. Bush, was shoed himself in Paris by an exiled Iraqi journalist, who accused him of "working for dictatorship in Iraq". When he was being escorted out of the room, Al-Zaidi went back to him with his shoe to hit him back, striking him in the back of the head with the shoe. The incident occurred while al-Zaidi was speaking about his experiences during the Bush shoeing and its aftermath. Al-Zaidi later noted, "He stole my technique."

=== 2010 ===
- January: During a public meeting, a man threw a shoe at Sudanese President Omar al-Bashir in the Friendship Hall in Khartoum, which missed. The man was later detained by security forces, while the president's office denied the incident took place and said the man was arrested as he attempted to pass a letter to al-Bashir. Witnesses described the man, whose reasons for throwing the shoe were unclear, as calm as he was detained.
- 27 January: During a hearing on medical marijuana, 52-year-old Pinchas Cohen hurled his sneaker at President of the Supreme Court of Israel Dorit Beinisch. The shoe struck Beinisch between the eyes, breaking her glasses and knocking her off her chair. Cohen, disgruntled over a family court decision four years prior, was arrested for the act, and sentenced for three years in prison. Cohen later apologized to Beinisch.
- February: A 26-year-old Kurd with Syrian citizenship tried to shoe Turkish prime minister Recep Tayyip Erdoğan in Seville, Spain. The shoes missed Erdogan. While throwing the shoes, the man called, "long live free Kurdistan".
- 6 March: Chief Secretary for Administration Henry Tang, attended a youth summit in Chai Wan, Hong Kong, organized by the Home Affairs Bureau. A 31-year-old man threw a shoe at Tang, and it landed on the stage meters away from him. The man was taken away by police. The man was unemployed after getting fired by a computer company, and said that government policies were not helping him. He said he was not a "post-80s" teen, but supported the highspeed rail protest connecting HK to Guangdong. Before the summit, about 30 people from several youth groups gathered outside the building to wave banners and said the forum was a fake consultation and that young people's opinions were neglected. When Tang left the building, protesters tried to block his passage and demanded to speak to him. One protester laid on the road in front of Tang's car and had to be forcibly removed by the police. A protester said that the topics discussed in the summit are not those that any young person would be interested in.
- 7 August: President of Pakistan Asif Ali Zardari was targeted by a 50-year-old man named Sardar Shamim Khan, who hurled a pair of shoes at him during Zardari's visit to Birmingham, England. Khan was wrestled down by security guards after he threw two shoes and shouted "killer" as Zardari spoke during a political rally at the International Convention Centre. The shoes did not hit Zardari, who did not respond to the attack. Khan was believed to be a Pakistani national from Derby who was sitting in the front row at the rally. He was dressed in a traditional Shalwar kameez. Following the incident, he was led away by police, questioned, and later released without charge. Shamim Khan said that he was angered by Zardari's spending a week-long trip to Europe event as the 2010 Pakistan floods were raging.
- 15 August: In India, a police officer hurled his brown leather shoe at Jammu and Kashmir Chief Minister Omar Abdullah. The chief minister was about to address a gathering organised on India's 64th Independence Day. The officer, identified as assistant sub-inspector of police Abdul Ahad Jan, later waved a black flag, shouting pro-freedom slogans against Indian rule in the disputed territory. Abdullah's security men escorted the officer from the function venue.
- 4 September: Former UK prime minister Tony Blair had an egg and shoes thrown at him at a signing for his book, A Journey, outside Eason's in Dublin.
- 5 September Anti-war protesters threw eggs, bottles and shoes at former British prime minister Tony Blair at another book signing event in Dublin.
- 11 September: A shoe was thrown at Greek prime minister George Papandreou while he was inaugurating the Thessaloniki International Fair. Stergios Prapavesis, a 50-year-old radiologist and militant of the Patriotic Front (PAM), tossed the shoe, shouting, "You are not a patriot, you are a traitor", referring to the decision of the Greek government under Papandreou to accept IMF, ECB, and EU austerity measures. The shoe missed him by inches while Prapavesis, along with his 15-year-old daughter as well as farmer Stavros Vitalis, who was with the pair at the time, was apprehended. Just moments after he left, an angry protester threw another shoe at him. On its website, the group "calls upon the Greek people to express their displeasure by throwing their old shoes along the Prime Minister's journey from the airport to the Thessaloniki International Fair." Prapavesis described the shoe-throwing incident as "a political act against the government's austerity policies" and warned that "many more will follow."
- 25 October: Two shoes were thrown at John Howard, the former Prime Minister of Australia, by Peter Gray, live on the ABC Television program Q&A while Howard was defending his decision to commit Australian troops to the 2003 invasion of Iraq.
- 6 November: During a Paramore concert at The O2 in Dublin, Ireland, someone threw a shoe at Paramore's lead singer Hayley Williams.

=== 2011 ===
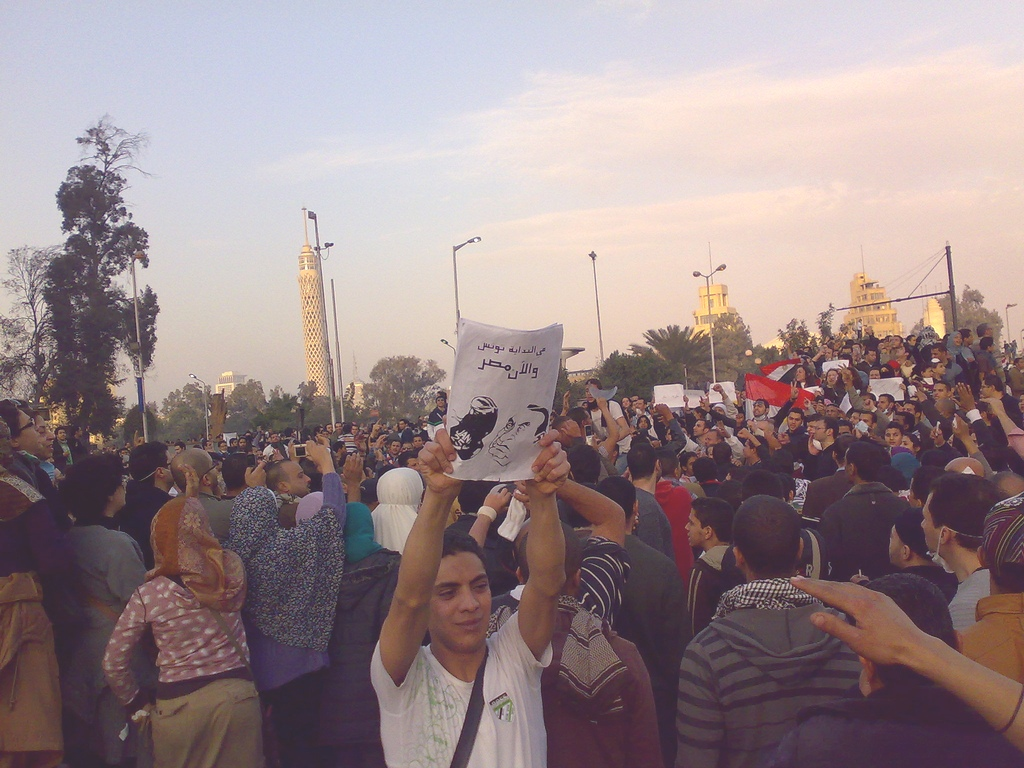
A demonstration in Cairo. The sign has an open source caricature by Carlos Latuff, which features shoeing.

- 6 February: A man threw a shoe at Pervez Musharraf, the former President of Pakistan, while Musharraf was addressing a Pakistani diaspora gathering at Walthamstow, London. The man threw the shoe to protest against the U.S. detention of Pakistani citizens.
- 10 February: During the 2011 Egyptian revolution, Hosni Mubarak announced that he would not be stepping down from his position as President of Egypt. Crowds gathered in Cairo’s Tahrir Square and waved their shoes in protest.
- 26 April: In India, while arrested former chairman of the 2010 Commonwealth Games Organising Committee Suresh Kalmadi was being led into court, Kapil Thakur from Madhya Pradesh threw a slipper at him, which missed Kalmadi.
- 19 May: Fang Binxing, the Principal of Beijing University of Posts and Telecommunications (also known as "Father of the Great Firewall of China") was hit on the chest by a shoe thrown at him by a Huazhong University of Science and Technology student who called himself "Hanjunyi" (Chinese:寒君依, or 小湖北) while Fang was giving a lecture at Wuhan University. According to RFI, the student discussed the planned shoe attack on Twitter and, with the help of other bloggers, was able to locate the exact whereabouts and the time of Fang's lecture. After the shoeing, "Hanjunyi" walked out while other students tried to obstruct school teachers who were going to detain him. "Hanjunyi" became an instant internet hero of the Chinese blogosphere. During an interview with CNN, "Hanjunyi" said, "I'm not happy about what (Fang) does. His work made me spend unnecessary money to get access to the website that is supposed to be free... He makes my online surfing very inconvenient."
- 6 June: In India, Congress spokesperson Janardhan Dwivedi was targeted at a press conference by a man who tried to throw a shoe at him. It was reaction after Delhi Police ordered dismantle act against Yoga Teacher Baba Ramdev's Protest against Corruption. The attacker, Sunil Kumar, posed as a journalist working with Nav Sanchar Patrika of Rajasthan.
- 18 October: RTI activist, member of India Against Corruption, and leader of Aam Aadmi Party Arvind Kejriwal was targeted in Lucknow, India, when Jitendra Pathak threw a shoe at him but missed. It was one week after another member of IAC and senior Supreme Court of India Lawyer Prashant Bhushan was assaulted in his chamber at the Supreme Court.
- 12 December: A 45-year-old textile worker identified as S. Rashid hurled his shoes at Iranian president Mahmoud Ahmadinejad in protest for not having received unemployment benefits. Rashid missed, instead striking a banner behind the president. Rashid was jailed before for throwing eggs and tomatoes at former president Mohammad Khatami.

=== 2012 ===
- 7 January: Numerous German protesters, unhappy with President Christian Wulff's behaviour in a private loan scandal, waved the soles of their shoes at his official residence, calling for him to resign.
- 23 January: A shoe was thrown at Congress General Secretary and Amethi MP Rahul Gandhi during an election rally in Dehradun, India. One person was detained for throwing the shoe. "If some people think that throwing a shoe will deter me and force me to run away, then they are mistaken. Rahul Gandhi will not run away," Gandhi said.
- 11 May: In Oslo, Norway, an Iraqi man threw a shoe at Anders Behring Breivik during Breivik's trial for mass murder. The man shouted in English, "You killed my brother! Go to hell!" The man throwing the shoe was the brother of one of Breivik's victims on Utøya. The shoe did not hit Breivik, but hit instead Vibeke Hein Bæra, one of Breivik's lawyers. Some onlookers cheered and applauded the shoe-throwing. The trial was temporarily suspended following the incident.
- 15 July: in Alexandria, Egypt, during an official visit, U.S. Secretary of State Hillary Clinton's motorcade was pelted with shoes and tomatoes by protesters chanting "Monica, Monica", a reference to the Monica Lewinsky scandal involving her husband, former president Bill Clinton.
- 18 August: In Montreal, Quebec, Canada, during the 2012 Napa Auto Parts 200, at the Circuit Giles Vilenueve, a fan for no apparent reason threw a shoe onto the track. Race leader Danica Patrick would hit the shoe under caution, damaging her car's steering. She would limp home in 27th place.
- 7 October When giving a lecture at Hainan University in China, Sima Nan had a shoe thrown at him by a student. The episode occurred during the Q & A period. Arguing that Sima's Maoist views were a threat to freedom, the student quoted Socrates before hurling his sneaker to Sima, to the cheers of a packed auditorium.
- 10 December: in Xindian, New Taipei, Taiwan, some protesters threw various items, including a shoe, toward President Ma Ying-jeou during an activity related to Human Rights Day, but Ma was not hit by the shoe.

=== 2013 ===
- February: An Iraqi man threw shoes at the former US diplomat Paul Bremer who served as civilian administrator of the Coalition Provisional Authority of Iraq following the 2003 US invasion of the country. The incident happened at a meeting in the British Parliament.
- 6-7 February: in Cairo, Egypt, an Egyptian man threw a shoe at Iranian president Mahmoud Ahmadinejad but missed. The next day at a reception hosted by the Iranian delegation to the Islamic Summit, another man threw a shoe at Ahmadinejad while he spoke to a small crowd. This shoe did hit him while he was speaking, but he continued his remarks.
- 26 February: A shoe was thrown at Harry Styles of One Direction during the Glasgow leg of their Take Me Home Tour on 26 February 2013. The shoe hit him in the groin, and the singer was seen bending over in pain before falling to the ground.
- 29 March: Tajammul Lodhi, a Karachi lawyer, threw his shoe at former president Pervez Musharraf while Musharraf was leaving Sindh High Court after obtaining an extension of his pre-arrest bail in a series of cases. Lodhi later said in an interview that he had thrown the shoe because he hated Musharraf for trying to destroy democracy in Pakistan. Musharraf was hit on the nose.
- 24 April: Stephen Patel, the vice-principal at Holy Spirit Catholic Elementary School, located in an eastern end of Toronto - Scarborough, Ontario, Canada threw a shoe at a 14-year-old student Ian Goulbourne in the forehead while on the excursion at Montreal on the school bus. Goulborune was taken to the Montreal Children's Hospital to be treated and Patel was sent home the next day on the Via Rail train on paid leave by the Toronto Catholic District School Board while it investigated the incident.

==== Taiwan ====
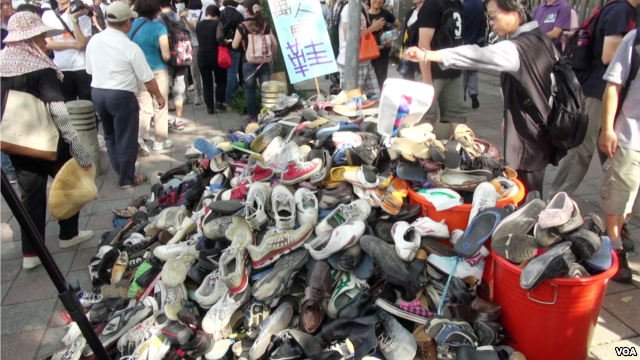
Taiwanese people donated old shoes in support of shoe-throwing protests against the Ma Ying-jeou administration and the ruling party KMT.

- 8 September: In Taipei, some protesters gathered in front of the Office of the President and threw shoes toward President Ma Ying-jeou, but he was not hit by these shoes. This was one of the first occurrences of which Ma had shoes thrown at him during public appearances. This became such a problem that various police departments in Taiwan spent NT$482,890 (US$16,000) to purchase 149 anti-shoeing nets.
- 18 September: A shoe was thrown at Liu Cheng-hung, then-Magistrate of Miaoli County, when he attempted to offer his condolences to the family of a man found dead in a water channel under a bridge at Dapu, Zhunan. Supporters and relatives of the drowned man held Liu responsible for the man's death because the man's pharmacy was one of several structures destroyed by the Miaoli county government earlier that July to make way for the construction of a new campus at the Hsinchu Science Park. The shoe, which was owned by protester Chen Wei-ting, hit Liu in the head.
- 26 September: In Yunlin County, some protesters threw shoes at President Ma Ying-jeou during a student forum at National Yunlin University of Science and Technology, but he was not hit by these shoes.
- 29 September: In Taipei, some protesters gathered in front of the Office of the President and threw shoes at President Ma Ying-jeou, but he was not hit by these shoes.
- 10 October: In Taipei, some protesters gathered in front of Office of the President and threw shoes, toward President Ma Ying-jeou during an activity related to Taiwan National Day, but he was not hit by these shoes.
- 12 October: In Chiayi County, some protesters threw shoes at President Ma Ying-jeou's convoy during the Mayoral Forum of the Kuomintang. The police tried to avoid conflict between protesters and the convoy by implementing a one-story-high shoes-catching net. Several shoes thrown by protesters were caught by the special net; Ma Ying-jeou was not hit.
- 19 October: In Keelung, some protesters threw shoes at President Ma Ying-jeou during an activity related to anniversary of the founding of National Taiwan Ocean University, but he was not hit by these shoes.
- 19 October: In Taipei, a protester threw a shoe at President Ma Ying-jeou during the opening ceremony of the 2013 National Games, but he was not hit by the shoe.
- 20 October: In Taipei, some protesters threw shoes at President Ma Ying-jeou during the Taipei Hakka Yimin Festival, but he was not hit by these shoes.
- 10 November: In Wuqi District, Taichung, protesters threw shoes at Ma Ying-jeou's convoy when passing by while Ma attended the Kuomintang's 19th National Congress meeting. Ma was not hit by these shoes due to heavy police security implementations. Containers with urine and fireworks were also used in the protests.

=== 2014 ===
- 10 April: In Las Vegas, Nevada, United States, a female protester threw a shoe at Hillary Clinton during a scrap metal recycling conference. Clinton was not hit by the shoe and subsequently joked about it.
- 19 April: In Lahti, Finland, supporters of FC Lahti waved their shoes during a football match against HJK Helsinki in disrespect of the HJK team and supporters. Before the game, local police stopped a fight between 40 supporters from Lahti and Helsinki.
- 4 August: In Las Vegas, Nevada, following an "Ultimate Media Day" at MGM Grand Hotel and Casino for UFC 178, UFC light heavyweight champion (at the time) Jon Jones and upcoming challenger Daniel Cormier got into a scuffle on stage, after which Cormier threw a shoe at Jones.
- 15 August: In Issru, Ludhiana, India, an unemployed youth Vikram Singh threw his shoe allegedly towards Chief Minister of Punjab Parkash Singh Badal while he was on the dais during a political conference.
- 12 October: Ronnie Price threw his shoe at Andre Iguodala during a Warriors–Lakers game.

=== 2015 ===
- 5 January: In Patna, India, a man threw a shoe at the Chief Minister of Bihar, Jitan Ram Manjhi.
- 28 January: Atlético Madrid player Arda Turan threw his shoe at the linesman in a Copa del Rey game against FC Barcelona.
- 21 March: Marta Jandová threw off her shoe in the middle of her song performance, representing the Czech Republic at the Eurovision Song Contest 2015 in Vienna.
- 14 June: David Sprigg threw his shoes at Australian Immigration Minister Peter Dutton in Brisbane, later saying, "I think he should be ashamed for what his government is doing and how asylum seekers are being treated in detention centres. When they use language like 'queue jumpers' and 'illegal arrivals', I think they're really just turning the public against refugees."
- 4 November: At a seminar in Chennai on "The Future of Sri Lankan Tamil Refugees in India", a 35-year-old Sri Lankan Tamil later identified as Prabhakaran of Aranthangi in Pudukkottai, Tamil Nadu, hurled a slipper at India's former National Security Advisor M. K. Narayanan after Narayanan finished speaking. As police escorted Prabhakaran from the room, he stated that Narayanan was responsible for the massacre of thousands of Tamils in Sri Lanka.

=== 2016 ===
- 1 March: A man hit the Pakistani Federal minister for Information and Broadcasting Pervaiz Rashid with a shoe, protesting the execution of Mumtaz Hussain Qadri.
- 31 March: In Ulaanbaatar, Mongolia at the MEF (Mongolian Economic Forum) Prime Minister Enkhbold Zandaakhuu, speaker of the Great Hural (Parliament), held the closing speech when an economist named L. Naranbaatar threw a sock and yelled at him. Security persons evacuated Naranbaatar out of the auditorium.

=== 2017 ===
- 11 January: In India, Chief Minister of Punjab, Parkash Singh Badal, was addressing the people present in Ratta Khera Village of his constituency, Lambi. Meanwhile, a relative of Sikh Preacher Amrik Singh Ajnala hurled the shoe at him to protest last year's burning of Sikh Holy Books and yelled at the speaker. A similar incident happened to Badal in 2014 as well.
- 10 June: At the Summerburst Festival 2017 in Stockholm, Justin Bieber had a shoe thrown at him because he could not remember the lyrics to Spanish single, "Despacito".

=== 2018 ===
- 30 January: A group of San Diegans hurled flip-flops at a screen displaying Donald Trump's State of the Union address.
- 24 February: Bilal Haris hurled a shoe at Interior Minister Ahsan Iqbal during a Pakistan Muslim League-Nawaz (PML-N) workers convention in Narowal.
- 27 February: Pakistan Tehreek-e-Insaf MPA Arbab Jahandad Khan hurled a shoe at MPA-elect Baldev Kumar in Khyber Pakhtunkhwa Assembly.
- 11 March: A shoe was hurled at Nawaz Sharif, former prime minister of Pakistan, when he was about to address a religious gathering at Jamia Naeemia Lahore.
- 28 June: A slipper was hurled at Taipei Mayor Ko Wen-je (柯文哲) during an event at Taipei Main Station. The slipper was found with a note reading "臭鞋丟臭柯 (Throw a stinky shoe at stinky Ko)".
- 7 September: Cardi B threw a red stiletto at Nicki Minaj.

=== 2019 ===
- 29 January: During the 2019 AFC Asian Cup semifinal match between Qatar and the tournament host United Arab Emirates, the UAE supporters threw bottles, sandals, and shoes into the pitch. This conduct was preceded by booing the Qatari national anthem. Qatar won 4–0 despite the situation, paving way to their first Asian Cup final and eventual title. The two countries have had a hostile relationship and had cut ties amid the Qatar diplomatic crisis.
- 15 March: Former professional Australian rules footballer Rhys Palmer also threw a shoe at horses in the middle of a race at Gloucester Park in Perth, Western Australia. The West Australian newspaper reported this event in an article called "Former AFL star Rhys Palmer likely to get boot for shoe caper at Gloucester Park". Palmer was a journeyman footballer (playing for Freemantle, Greater Western Sydney, and Carlton). However, he did win the Rising Star award in 2008 ahead of Thiryl Rioli. Palmer was injured in a car crash the day after the incident.
- 5 June: During game one of the Australian 2019 State of Origin NRL series, Queensland hooker Ben Hunt seemingly deliberately removed the shoe of New South Wales captain Boyd Cordner during a tackle. Hunt then ran from the tackle and threw the shoe into the crowd, forcing Cordner to spend the next few minutes of the game playing without a left boot.

=== 2020 ===
- 12 December: During a college football game between the LSU Tigers and the Florida Gators, Florida cornerback Marco Wilson threw an LSU player's shoe in celebratory fashion after the Gators appeared to have stopped the Tigers on third down and force a punt late in a tied game. The 15-yard unsportsmanlike conduct penalty proved costly, as LSU kicked a game-winning field goal and Florida missed their own field goal to force overtime in the Tigers' 37–34 win.

=== 2022 ===
- 4 August: At a meeting with the mayor of Uglegorsk in Russia's Sakhalin island and the regional governor, a woman who had been seeking relocation from a severely damaged half-abandoned house for years showed them a shoe that got moldy in her apartment and threw it at the mayor.

=== 2023 ===
- 19 July: NBA player Jimmy Butler claimed to have been hit by a shoe in the Chinese city of Taiyuan during a tour of the country. In a subsequently released video, Butler was seen greeting a group of fans when he was hit in the face by a pink shoe.
- 10 December: Chief minister of Kerala Pinarayi Vijayan's convoy was hit by shoes from protestors of the opposition party. The shoe throwing was to protest the statewide travel and meetings of the Chief minister and the state ministry with the people of the state, which protesters argue to be luxurious and unnecessary.

=== 2024 ===
- 16 December: During a visit to Sednaya Prison in Damascus, a Syrian woman attempted to throw a shoe at UN envoy Geir Pedersen. The woman was looking for her missing relatives; she criticized the UN for neglecting to intervene beforehand.

=== 2025 ===
- 5 May: While addressing residents at Migori, Kenya, a man in the crowd threw a shoe at William Ruto, president of the Republic of Kenya. He cut his speech short for a moment before proceeding. The shoe is currently held by the police and a petition is being filed to have it displayed as one of the democracy struggle artefacts in the Kenya National Museum.
- 6 October: During court proceedings, a shoe was thrown at Chief Justice of India B. R. Gavai by an advocate named Rakesh Kishoor, hitting the Chief Justice and another Justice. This was following a derogatory comments made by the CJI about Hinduism in India while hearing a case from Madhya Pradesh regarding restitution of worship of the Hindu god Vishnu at a temple currently under control of ASI. Kishoor was quoted stating "India won't tolerate insult to Sanatan Dharma." He was removed from the room, and no charges were pressed against him due to direct instruction by CJI. He is presently suspended from the court. A nation wide discourse followed, including condemnation by Indian Prime Minister Narendra Modi.

=== 2026 ===
- 12 July: During a WNBA game between the New York Liberty and the Toronto Tempo, New York player Betnijah Laney-Hamilton threw teammate Jonquel Jones' shoe during a stoppage in play, striking Toronto player Marina Mabrey in the back. Officials assessed Laney-Hamilton her second technical foul of the game, resulting in her ejection. Laney-Hamilton stated after the game that she had intended to return the shoe to Jones and did not intend to hit Mabrey.

== See also ==
- Acid attack
- Egging
- Glitter bombing
- Incidents of objects being thrown at politicians
- Inking (attack)
- Pieing
- Villain hitting
- Zelyonka attack
