= Al-Baghdadia TV =

Television channel

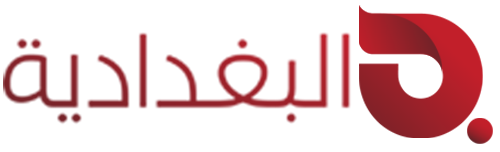
- Type: Satellite Television
- Branding: Nationalistic
- Country: Cairo, Egypt and Baghdad, Iraq
- Availability: Middle East, Europe, North America and Australia
- Broadcast area: Middle East
- Owner: Awn Hussain Al Khashlok
- Launch date: 12 September 2005
- Official website: www.albaghdadia.com

Al-Baghdadia TV is an independent Iraqi-owned Arabic-language satellite channel based in Cairo, Egypt. It is considered a nationalist channel of funding directly and only from the CEO. During the Iraqi insurgency, several prominent journalists with the station were murdered. More recently, Global TV Stations depend on Al Baghdadia for news coming from Iraq. It has a live morning show called 'Al Baghdadia Wa El Nas' which is a free show that allows Iraqis to give their opinion and to send a message to the government, this supports Iraqi democracy. The CEO of Al Baghdadia believes that democracy should be created by true Iraqis, not by force. The TV station is dubbed the name 'Umm al-Fuqarā' (The Mother of the Poor People). In 2012, Al-Baghdadia Media Group launches its second channel, B2, broadcasting mainly series, drama, movies and entertainment. since then Al Baghdadia 2 is first entertainment channel in Iraq, B2 freq on Nilesat (Frequency: 11747, S/R: 27500, Pol: Horizontal, Fec: 4/3) .

== History ==
=== Management and programming ===
Al-Baghdadia is a general entertainment channel that broadcasts in Arabic via a Hot Bird 8 at 13E satellite (Frequency: 11747, S/R:27500, Pol:Vertical, Fec: 3/4), Nilesat (Frequency: 11747, S/R: 27500, Pol: Horizontal, Fec: 4/3), the CEO and Managing Director of the station is Dr. Awn Hussain Al Khashlok (a Civil Engineer), Abdel-Hameed al-Sayeh is the station's manager, in Cairo. The Newseum said, "The station is often critical of the U.S. presence in Iraq." Dr. Hussein Shaaban, the previous director general of Al Baghdadia, has described the U.S. occupation as "humiliating to Iraq".

=== Muntadhar al-Zaidi and shoeing of Bush ===
In September 2005, Muntadhar al-Zaidi joined the station. On 16 November 2007, al-Zaidi was kidnapped in Baghdad working on assignment for Al-Baghdadia, but released on November 19, without harm or ransom payments. The studio gained international attention when al-Zaidi hurled two of his shoes at U.S. President George W. Bush during a press conference in Baghdad on 14 December 2008. Dhirgham al-Zaidi, who sometimes worked as his brother's cameraman, said Muntadhar's reporting for the station was "against the occupation," and that at times he signed off "from occupied Baghdad." Dihirgham said the reporter's stories focused on Iraqi widows, orphans, and children.

After he was jailed, the station issued a statement demanding al-Zaidi's release. Canada's The Globe and Mail chastised the channel in an editorial, stating, "To its shame, Al Baghdadia has not only failed to apologize, or to discipline or fire Mr. Zaidi, who is being held in an Iraqi jail over the attempted assault, but instead posted his photo on its website and attacked the government for holding him." The network appointed Dheyaa al-Saadi, president of the Union of Lawyers in Iraq, to defend Zaidi.

=== Journalists murdered ===
In a round of killings targeting journalists during the Iraqi insurgency that shocked the country, Al-Baghdadia suffered through several casualties of some of its most well-known contributors. On 16 January 2006, cameraman Luaay Salam Radeef was murdered. In April 2006, So'oud Muzahim al-Shoumari, an Al-Baghdadia correspondent, was found dead in Baghdad's southern district of Doura, according to the Committee to Protect Journalists (CPJ). On 5 May 2006, human rights correspondent So'oud Mukahim Al-Shoumari, who was also known by the last name Al-Hadithi, was abducted, tortured and shot dead in Baghdad.

A line producer for the channel, Jawad Al-Daami, was murdered in Baghdad on 24 September 2007. Al-Daami, a very well known poet, worked on cultural and social programs for Al-Baghdadia until he was found shot in the head in Al-Qadissiya, a neighborhood in southwestern Baghdad.
