= Supreme Iraqi Criminal Tribunal =

The Iraqi High Tribunal (IHT), formerly the Iraqi Special Tribunal and sometimes referred to as the Supreme Iraqi Criminal Tribunal, is a body established under Iraqi national law to try Iraqi nationals or residents accused of genocide, crimes against humanity, war crimes or other serious crimes committed between 1968 and 2003. It organized the trial of Saddam Hussein and other members of his Ba'ath Party regime.

The court was set up by a specific statute issued under the Coalition Provisional Authority and was reaffirmed under the jurisdiction of the Iraqi Interim Government. In 2005, it was renamed after the constitution established that "Special or exceptional courts may not be established." The Transitional Administrative Law (TAL) promulgated by the Iraq Governing Council before the restoration of Iraqi sovereignty preserved and continued the Iraq Special Tribunal Statute in force and effect.

The court was responsible for the trial of Saddam Hussein, Ali Hassan al-Majid (also known as "Chemical Ali"), former vice president Taha Yassin Ramadan, former deputy prime minister Tariq Aziz and other former senior officials in the deposed Ba'athist regime.

== Judges ==
The tribunal follows the inquisitorial system which is standard in Iraq and uses investigative judges. Trials are heard before a panel of the five trial judges, who conduct hearings, pronounce judgements and impose the sentences, without using a jury. There is also a separate Appeals Chamber, with nine judges, a prosecutions department and an administrative department. The statute of the court allows for international judges to be appointed on the request of the court and approval of the Council of Ministers, but none have yet been appointed. Judges were initially appointed to a five-year term by the Iraqi Governing Council, in consultation with the Iraqi Judicial Council.

For security reasons, the names of the judges were not initially released, but five judges' identities were subsequently disclosed:

- Rizgar Mohammed Amin, a Kurdish judge, was presiding judge of the Trial Chamber until 23 January 2006 when he quit citing government interference
- Rauf Rashid Abd al-Rahman, the presiding judge of the Trial Chamber from 23 January 2006.
- Said Hameesh, the deputy presiding judge, who was removed from the Tribunal after the De-Baathification Commission found that he was a former member of the Baath Party, which made him ineligible to be a judge.
- Raed al-Juhi (also transliterated as Raid Juhi, Ra'id Juhi or Raid Juhi Alsaedi), the tribunal's Chief Investigative Judge.
- Barwize Mohammed Mahmoud al-Merani, an investigative judge who was fatally shot on 2 March 2006

== Jurisdiction ==
The tribunal has jurisdiction over any Iraqi national or resident accused of the following crimes:

- Genocide
- Crimes against humanity
- War crimes
- Manipulating the judiciary
- Squandering national resources
- The use of armed force against an Arab country

These crimes must have been committed:

- After the coup by Ahmed Hassan al-Bakr on 17 July 1968
- Before 1 May 2003 which was after the invasion of Iraq that brought an end to the rule of Saddam Hussein.

== Rights of the accused ==
The rights of the accused are set out in the tribunal's statute and include the presumption of innocence, equality before the tribunal, a public trial without undue delay, appointing counsel of the defendant's own choosing, calling witnesses, and the right to remain silent.

== Penalties ==
The tribunal must impose sentences in line with existing Iraqi law, which includes the death penalty. For crimes such as crimes against humanity which have no counterpart in Iraqi law, the statute says the trial chamber should take into consideration the gravity of the offense and sentences issued by international criminal tribunals.

== Investigations ==
=== Dujail trial ===
From October 2005 to 5 November 2006, the tribunal tried eight people who were accused of crimes against humanity in a massacre of 148 Shiites in Dujail. The defendants included:

- Saddam Hussein, former president of Iraq (1937–2006)
- Barzan Ibrahim al-Tikriti, Hussein's half-brother and former chief of intelligence (1951–2007)
- Taha Yassin Ramadan, former vice-president (1938–2007)
- Awad Hamed al-Bandar, a former chief judge (1945–2007)
- Abdullah Kadhem Roweed Al-Musheikhi (1925–2011)
- Ali Daeem Ali (1940–2015)
- Mohammed Azawi Ali (1943–2011)
- Mizher Abdullah Roweed Al-Musheikhi (1952)

At Saddam Hussein's initial arraignment he was also accused of:

- the killing of religious figures in 1974;
- the Halabja poison gas attack;
- the killing of Kurds in 1983;
- killing members of political parties;
- displacing Kurds in the mid-1980s;
- suppressing Kurdish and Shiite uprisings in 1991; and
- the invasion of Kuwait.

On 5 November 2006, Saddam Hussein was found guilty of all charges relating to the Dujail massacre and was sentenced to death by hanging. He received an automatic appeal. However, the appeal was rejected and the guilty sentence was upheld. It was ordered that he be executed within 30 days and he was executed by hanging on 30 December 2006.

=== Al-Anfal campaign ===
The Special Tribunal investigated the crimes of the al-Anfal campaign in 1988 and during the 1991 uprising. The judges issued arrest warrants against these persons for crimes against Kurds in 1988:

- Taher Tawfiq al-Ani
- Hussein Rasheed Mohammed

The judges also issued arrest warrants against these persons for crimes in 1991:

- Barzan Abdul Ghafoor
- Muzahim Sa`ab Al-Hassan

In June 2005, the judges investigated crimes carried out in 1990, ethnic crimes in the city of Kirkuk, and crimes against Faili Kurds, questioning these accused:

- Aead Futaih Khaleefa for the 1990 events and crimes in Kirkuk;
- Muhsen Khedher Abass for the 1990 events;
- Watban Ibrahim al-Tikriti for exiling and killing Ufaili Kurds.
- Mohammed Zemam Abd Al-Razaq for ethnic cleansing in Kirkuk;
- Barzan Ibrahim al-Tikriti for exiling and killing Ufaili Kurds;
- Lateef Nusaif Jassim for ethnic cleansing in Kirkuk.

In late June the judges had investigated Tariq Aziz concerning the events of 1991.

The judges also questioned these persons concerning the use of chemical weapons in the al-Anfal campaign:

- Saber Abd Al-Aziz Aldori
- Sultan Hashim Ahmed
- Ali Hassan al-Majid (1941–2010)

The judges questioned these persons on various events:

- Awad Hamed al-Bandar about religious oppression and crimes in Balad, Iraq;
- Abd Al-Ghany Abd Al- Ghafoor about religious oppression and crimes in Balad, Iraq;
- Mahmood Faizi Al-Hazaa about the Jomaa crime in Al-Emara city in 1999;
- Hashim Hassan Al-Majeed;
- Hassan Azeba Al-Ubaidi.

On 24 June 2007, Ali Hassan al-Majid, Sultan Hashim Ahmed al-Tay, and Hussein Rashid Mohammed were sentenced to hang for their role in the al-Anfal campaign against the Kurds. Two other former regime officials, Saber Abd Al-Aziz Aldori and Farhan Mutlaq Saleh were sentenced to life in prison. All charges against former governor of Mosul Taher Tawfiq Al-ani were dropped because of insufficient evidence.

Al-Majid would receive three more death sentences for other crimes: one for the 1991 suppression of a Shi'a uprising along with Abdul-Ghani Abdul Ghafur on 2 December 2008; one for the 1999 crackdown in the assassination of Grand Ayatollah Mohammad al-Sadr on 2 March 2009; and lastly on 17 January 2010 for the gassing of the Kurds in 1988. Afterwards, he was hanged over a week later on 25 January.

== General Director ==
The tribunal was initially led by Salem Chalabi a former exile and relative of Ahmed Chalabi. Critics pointed to Salem's lack of experience and close ties to Iraqi dissidents, questioning US motives in his appointment. However, as his uncle Ahmed Chalabi fell from US favour in August 2004, warrants were issued for their arrest while they were both out of Iraq. Some saw this as an attempt to remove them from Iraqi politics. On 19 September 2004, The New York Times quoted Iraqi interim Prime Minister Iyad Allawi as saying that he had received Salem's resignation. Speculation immediately started on who would replace Salem; names mentioned include Taleb al-Zubaidi and Naim al-Oukaili. On 4 October 2004, the Iraqi National Council approved the nomination of Judge Ammar al-Bakri, who became the new Administrator of the Special Tribunal – but was ousted in turn. The nine Appellate Judges have selected an eminent Iraqi jurist as president, who is the tribunal's leader. Tribunal procedures are governed by the Rules of Procedure and Evidence and the Iraqi Criminal Procedural Code of 1971.

== Controversies ==
Human Rights Watch's observed the Dujail trial and saw a number of serious shortcomings in how the Iraqi High Tribunal functioned. These include: 1) An almost complete lack of familiarity with international criminal law on the part of all Iraqi lawyers and judges involved in the trial; 2) Chaotic and inadequate administration which has given rise to major problems in performing basic administrative tasks necessary for a trial of this magnitude to run fairly; and 3) Such extensive use of anonymous witnesses that the defendants were deprived the right to contest the evidence against them.

— Human Rights Watch report on the flaws of Iraqi Special Tribunal, 22 June 2007

The Iraqi High Tribunal was widely criticized for its methodical defects and its political dependency on the Iraqi government. One of its controversial acts included the sacking of its presiding judge in September 2006 by Iraqi Prime Minister Nouri al-Maliki, who perceived the judge as biased towards defendants. Human Rights Watch considered the Dujail and Anfal trials to be unfair and stated that many of the charges were "vague", concluding that the defendants were unable to bring their witnesses due to safety issues within Iraq. Video interactions from witnesses of the defendants were also denied by the court, thus hampering the defendants' ability to challenge the claims of the prosecutors. The trials were marked by absence of fundamental judicial proceedings, such as the murder of three defense lawyers and ample utilization of anonymous witnesses by the prosecution, whose claims could not be cross analyzed by the defendants.

Both within and outside Iraq, the trials by the Special Tribunal were dubbed as a "show parade" designed to execute Saddam and deemed as illegitimate by numerous lawyers and human rights organizations. The tribunal itself was widely seen as a body that was influenced by the Bush administration since it was set by the Coalition Provisional Authority led by Paul Bremer, who himself directly reported to the US President. Numerous international lawyers have criticized the United States for playing too great a role in the foundation, financing, and operation of the tribunal. Richard Dicker, the director of International Justice Programme of Human Rights Watch, stated regarding the proceedings of Anfal trial:

"The court undercut the accused’s right to present a vigorous defense by allowing the prosecution to rely on vague charges and refusing requests to accommodate defense witnesses.. This includes refusing to hear testimony from defense witnesses abroad via videolink."

International legal experts argued for Saddam to be tried outside the country as it was believed that he would not receive a fair trial under inexperienced judges who had been long standing enemies of him and his regime. Following the re-introduction of capital punishment in August 2004, the Iraqi interim prime minister, Iyad Allawi, gave assurances that he would not interfere with the trial and would accept any court decisions, although some of his comments are open to misinterpretation: "As for the execution, that is for the court to decide so long as a decision is reached impartially and fairly."

One of the judges, Ra’id Juhi, had indicted Moqtada al-Sadr for murder in April 2004, which British journalist Robert Fisk said had precipitated the Iraq spring fighting of 2004. Fisk said that Juhi, a Shia Muslim then 33, had served as a judge under Saddam for a decade, then worked as a translator, and was appointed to the tribunal by Paul Bremer.

== Other legal issues ==
The Iraqi Special Tribunal also contains an official English translation of the Iraqi Criminal and Civil Code, which Paul Bremer decreed would be the operating legal code of Iraq until it is changed or modified by the Iraqi government.

One emerging, critical issue to the mission of the Iraqi High Tribunal is that of women's human rights. Women occupy a uniquely vulnerable position in conflict, and the Iraqi High Tribunal is charged with prosecuting gender-based crimes within the Hussein regime. Historically, rape has proven a prolific problem in conflict, and in many Mid-East countries, including Iraq, such phenomena as honor crimes (the killing of rape victims by male family members to restore honor to the family name) inhibited gender justice. The judges of the Iraqi High Tribunal have taken a pioneering interest in gender justice, requesting a training in fall of 2006 on international law tenets that protect women's human rights. Attorney Janet Benshoof of the Global Justice Center was among the legal authorities stressing the importance of upholding women's rights in future Iraqi High Tribunal decisions. The judges proved very interested in protecting women's human rights in their future decisions, and have requested an amicus (friend of the court) brief from concerned attorneys and women's civil society organizations regarding future gender jurisprudence.

== See also ==
- 2003 invasion of Iraq
