= Capital punishment in Iraq =

Capital punishment is a legal penalty in Iraq. It was commonly used by the government of Saddam Hussein (who was himself ultimately executed), was temporarily halted after the US-led 2003 invasion of Iraq that deposed Hussein, and has since been reinstated. Executions are carried out by hanging.

Iraqi law states that no person over the age of 70 can be executed; however, there have been instances where this provision has been violated. There is a guaranteed right to appeal on all such sentences. Iraqi law requires execution take place within 30 days of all legal avenues being exhausted. The last legal step, before the execution proceeds, is for the condemned to be handed a red card. This is completed by an official of the court with details of the judgment and a notice that execution is imminent.

After the invasion of Iraq in 2003, U.S. administrator L. Paul Bremer suspended capital punishment on June 10, declaring that "the former regime used certain provisions of the penal code as a means of oppression, in violation of internationally acknowledged human rights." However, on August 8, 2004, capital punishment was reinstated in Iraq. Executions resumed in September 2005, after three men convicted of murder were executed. On March 9, 2006, an official of Iraq's Supreme Judicial Council confirmed that Iraqi authorities had executed the first insurgents by hanging. Twenty-seven people, including one woman, were executed by the Iraqi government on September 6, 2006, for high crimes against civilians. On January 19, 2012, 34 people were executed in a single day. Early in October 2013, 42 people convicted of terrorism charges were hanged over the course of two days. By that date a total of 132 people had been executed in 2013.

In July 2016, Iraqi Prime Minister Haider Al-Abadi ordered the execution of all terrorists condemned in the country following the Baghdad suicide truck bombing which killed over 250 people at a mall in Karrada, Baghdad. Iraq carried out at least 88 executions in 2016, and at least 125 in 2017. After the defeat of ISIS in Mosul in 2017, Iraq tried and sentenced captured terrorists to death in large numbers.

== Notable executions ==
Saddam Hussein was sentenced to death by hanging for crimes against humanity on November 5, 2006, and was executed on December 30, 2006 at approximately 6:00 a.m. local time. During the drop there was an audible crack indicating that his neck was broken, a successful example of a long drop hanging.

By contrast, Barzan Ibrahim al-Tikriti, the head of the Mukhabarat, Saddam's security agency, and Awad Hamed al-Bandar, former chief judge, were executed on January 15, 2007, also by the long drop method, but Barzan was decapitated by the rope at the end of his fall indicating that the drop was too long, relative to his body weight.

Also, former vice-president Taha Yassin Ramadan had been sentenced to life in prison on November 5, 2006, but the sentence was changed to death by hanging on February 12, 2007. He was the fourth and final man to be executed for the 1982 crimes against humanity on March 20, 2007. This time, the execution went smoothly and without obvious mistake or problem.

At the Anfal genocide trial, Saddam's cousin Ali Hassan al-Majid (aka Chemical Ali), former defense minister Sultan Hashim Ahmed al-Tai, and former deputy Hussein Rashid Mohammed were sentenced to hang for their role in the Al-Anfal Campaign against the Kurds on June 24, 2007. Al-Majid was sentenced to death three more times: once for the 1991 suppression of a Shi'a uprising along with Abdul-Ghani Abdul Ghafur on December 2, 2008; once for the 1999 crackdown in the assassination of Grand Ayatollah Mohammad al-Sadr on March 2, 2009; and once on January 17, 2010 for the gassing of the Kurds in 1988; he was hanged on January 25.

On October 26, 2010, Saddam's top minister Tariq Aziz was sentenced to hang for persecuting the members of rival Shi'a political parties. However, Iraqi President Jalal Talabani declared that he would not sign Aziz's execution order, thus commuting his sentence to indefinite imprisonment. Aziz remained in custody for the rest of his life and died of a heart attack on June 5, 2015.. He also never signed the execution order for Sultan Hashim Ahmad al-Tai, who died in prison in 2009

On July 14, 2011, the United States handed over Sultan Hashim Ahmed al-Tai and two of Saddam's half-brothers – Sabawi Ibrahim al-Tikriti and Watban Ibrahim al-Tikriti (both condemned to death on March 11, 2009 for the role in the executions of 42 traders who were accused of manipulating food prices) to the Iraqi authorities for execution.
