= Khamis al-Obeidi =

Iraqi lawyer (1966 – 2006)

Khamis al-Obeidi خميس العبيدي
- Born: July 7, 1966
- Died: June 21, 2006 (aged 39); Baghdad
- Occupation: Lawyer
- Known for: Defence lawyer for Saddam Hussein & Barzan Ibrahim al-Tikriti

Khamis al-Obeidi (Arabic: خميس العبيدي; July 7, 1966 – June 21, 2006) was a lawyer defending Saddam Hussein and Barzan Ibrahim al-Tikriti, from the time the former leader's trial began in Baghdad on October 19, 2005, until his assassination. He was a Sunni Muslim, was married and had three children.

== Murder ==
Al-Obeidi was abducted from his house in the Adhamiya district of Baghdad at approximately 7 AM, reportedly by men in Iraqi police uniform, and shot dead on June 21, 2006. His body was found near the Shia district of Sadr City with multiple gunshot wounds.

The killing occurred shortly before the final phase of Saddam Hussein's trial, and Khalil al-Dulaimi, Saddam's chief defense lawyer, believes that it was an attempt to intimidate Saddam's defense team, and blamed the Interior Ministry who have been alleged by Sunni Arabs to operate death squads who impersonate Iraqi police.

Some sources in Sadr City believe the murder of al-Obeidi to be the work of a warlord who goes by the name 'Abu Dereh'.

Al-Obeidi was the third member of Saddam Hussein's defense team to be killed since the trial started. He had previously spoken out against the two previous killings of defense lawyers, and the lack of security measures for him and his colleagues. Despite this, he had chosen to continue living in the Iraqi capital.

=== Reaction ===
Al-Obeidi's death prompted Saddam Hussein, along with the seven co-defendants, to go on a hunger strike with the intent of continuing until their defense team was provided international protection. However, the trial's chief prosecutor Jaafar al-Moussawi stated, "We will continue with the trial and will not be deterred." Amnesty International called for an investigation into the incident.

Saddam ended his hunger strike on June 23, 2006, having missed only one meal.

Saddam embarked upon a new hunger strike over al-Obeidi's killing on July 7, 2006, and required hospitalisation on July 23, 2006. The trial continued in his absence. He ended this second hunger strike after 18 days, and reappeared in court.

== See also ==
- Adel al-Zubeidi, a defense attorney for Taha Yassin Ramadan, murdered in 2005
- Saadoun Sughaiyer al-Janabi, a defense attorney for Awad Hamed al-Bandar, murdered in 2005
