= Trial of Saddam Hussein =

2005–2006 trial by the Iraqi Interim Government

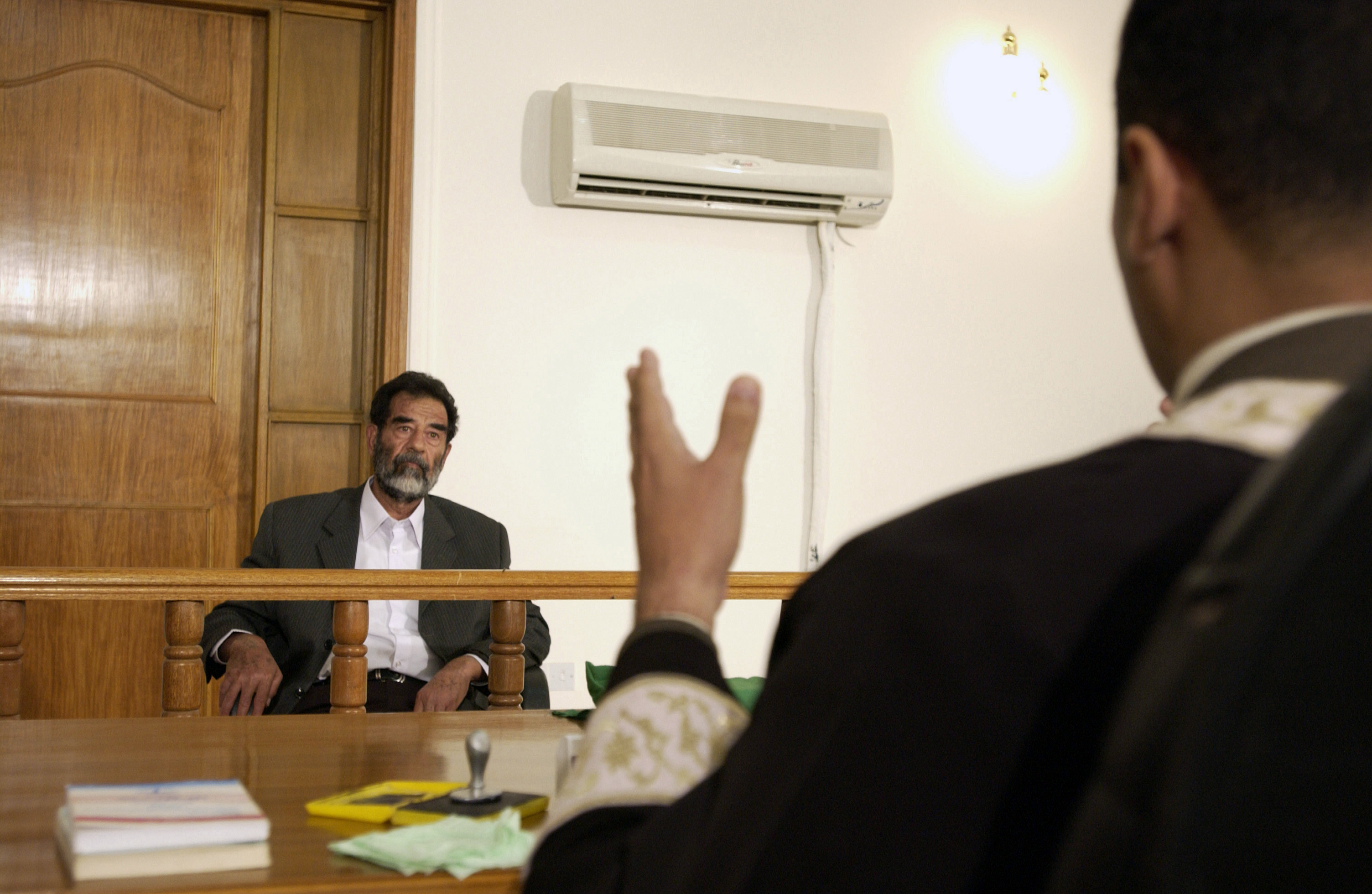
- Saddam Hussein sitting before an Iraqi judge at a courthouse in Baghdad, July 2004
- Court: Iraqi Special Tribunal (IST)
- Decided: 19 October 2005 – 21 December 2006
- Verdict: Saddam Hussein found guilty of crimes against humanity and subsequently sentenced to death; executed on 30 December 2006

The deposed president of Iraq, Saddam Hussein was tried by the Iraqi Interim Government for crimes against humanity committed during his time in office.

The Coalition Provisional Authority voted to create the Iraqi Special Tribunal (IST), consisting of five Iraqi judges, on 9 December 2003, to try Saddam and his aides for charges of war crimes, crimes against humanity, and genocide dating back to the early 1980s.

Saddam was captured by U.S. forces on 13 December 2003. He remained in custody by U.S. forces at Camp Cropper in Baghdad, along with eleven senior Ba'athist officials. Particular attention was paid during the trial to activities in violent campaigns against the Kurds in the north during the Iran–Iraq War, against the Shiites in the south in 1991 and 1999 to put down revolts, and in Dujail after a failed assassination attempt against Saddam on 8 July 1982, during the Iran–Iraq War. Saddam asserted in his defense that he had been unlawfully overthrown and was still president of Iraq.

The first trial began before the Iraqi Special Tribunal on 19 October 2005. Saddam and seven other defendants were tried for crimes against humanity with regard to events that took place after a failed assassination attempt in Dujail in 1982 by members of the Islamic Dawa Party (see also human rights abuses in Iraq under Saddam Hussein). A second and separate trial began on 21 August 2006, trying Saddam and six co-defendants for genocide during the Anfal campaign against the Kurds in northern Iraq.

On 5 November 2006, Saddam was sentenced to death by hanging. On 26 December, Saddam's appeal was rejected and the death sentence upheld. No further appeals were taken and Saddam was ordered executed within 30 days of that date. The date and place of the execution were secret until the sentence was carried out. Saddam was executed by hanging on 30 December 2006. With his death, all other charges were dropped.

Critics viewed the trial as a show trial that did not meet international standards on the right to a fair trial. Amnesty International stated that the trial was "unfair," and Human Rights Watch judged that Saddam's execution "follows a flawed trial and marks a significant step away from the rule of law in Iraq." Several months before the trial, Salem Chalabi, the former head of the Iraq Special Tribunal (which was established to try Hussein), accused interim Iraqi prime minister Iyad Allawi of pushing for a hasty show trial and execution, stating: "Show trials followed by speedy executions may help the interim government politically in the short term but will be counterproductive for the development of democracy and the rule of law in Iraq in the long term."

== First hearing: 1 July 2004 ==
The 67-year-old former president, Saddam Hussein, appeared confident and defiant throughout the 46-minute hearing. Alternating between listening to and gesturing at judge Rizgar Mohammed Amin, he questioned the legitimacy of the tribunal. He called the court a "play" aimed at increasing George W. Bush's chances of winning the U.S. presidential election. He emphatically rejected charges against him. "This is all theater. The real criminal is Bush", he stated. When asked by the judge to identify himself in his first appearance before an Iraqi judge (three of the five judges and the prosecutor were never identified nor photographed for security reasons), he answered, "You are an Iraqi, you know who I am."

Also during the arraignment, Saddam defended Iraq's August 1990 invasion of Kuwait and referred to Kuwaitis as "dogs" who were trying to turn the women of Iraq into "two-penny whores", which led to an admonition from the judge for using coarse language in court. Later on 1 July, Kuwait's information minister Abul-Hassan said the crude language was expected: "This is how he was raised".

Although no attorneys for Saddam were present at the 1 July hearing, his first wife, Sajida Talfah, hired a multinational team of attorneys, headed by Jordanian Mohammad Rashdan and including Ayesha Gaddafi (Libya), Curtis Doebbler (United States), Emmanuel Ludot (France) and Marc Henzelin (Switzerland). Towards the end of the first hearing, the deposed president refused to sign the legal document confirming his understanding of the charges.

== Pre-trial events ==
In a leaked transcript of a February 2003 meeting between George W. Bush and Spanish Prime Minister José Aznar, Bush expressed a willingness to have Saddam tried at the International Tribunal of Justice in The Hague.

In December 2004, Clive Stafford Smith prepared a 50-page brief for the defense team arguing that Saddam Hussein should be tried in the U.S. under U.S. criminal law.

The London-based Arab-language daily newspaper Al-Quds Al-Arabi reported in early May 2005 that during a meeting with Secretary of Defense Donald Rumsfeld, "known only to a few Iraqi officials in Jordan", Saddam refused an offer of release if he made a televised request to armed groups for a ceasefire with allied forces. The British newspaper The Daily Telegraph, quoting an unnamed senior UK government source, had reported two weeks earlier that Iraqi insurgents were being offered a "deal" whereby Saddam would receive a more lenient sentence if they gave up their attacks.

On 17 June 2005, former Malaysian prime minister Mahathir Mohamad, former U.S. Attorney General Ramsey Clark, former Minister of Foreign Affairs of France Roland Dumas and former President of Algeria Ahmed Ben Bella announced the formation, under their joint chairmanship, of an international Emergency Committee for Iraq, with a main objective of ensuring fair trials for Saddam and the other former Ba'ath Party officials being tried with him.

On 18 July 2005, Saddam was charged by the Special Tribunal with the first of an expected series of charges, relating to the mass killings of the inhabitants of the village of Dujail in 1982 after a failed assassination attempt against him.

On 8 August 2005, Saddam's family announced that they had dissolved the Jordan-based legal team and had appointed Khalil al-Duleimi, the only Iraq-based member, as the sole legal counsel. In an interview broadcast on Iraqi television on 6 September 2005, Iraqi president Jalal Talabani said that he had directly extracted confessions from Saddam that he had ordered mass killings and other "crimes" during his regime and that "he deserved to die." Two days later, Saddam's lawyer denied that he confessed.

Saddam's defense repeatedly argued for a delay in the proceedings, insisting that it had not been given evidence secured by the prosecution, had not been given sufficient time to review any prosecution documents, but these submissions received no response from the court. International human rights groups, including Human Rights Watch, Amnesty International, and UN bodies such as the Working Group on Arbitrary Detention and the High Commissioner for Human Rights stated that the Iraqi Special Tribunal and its legal process did not meet international standards for a fair trial. United Nations Secretary-General Kofi Annan declined to support the proceeding, expressing similar concerns over fairness as well as over the possibility of a death sentence in the case.

== Al-Dujail trial: 19 October 2005 ==
Iraqi authorities put Saddam and seven other former Iraqi officials on trial on 19 October 2005, four days after the 15 October 2005 referendum on the new Iraqi constitution. The tribunal specifically charged the defendants with the killing of 148 Shiites from Dujail, in retaliation for the failed assassination attempt of 8 July 1982. Supporters of Saddam protested against the trial in Tikrit. After the charges were read to them, all eight defendants pleaded not guilty. While initially open to the public, the trial was closed to them on 15 March 2006, after Saddam began making political statements on the stand and an argument began between him and the presiding judge.

Saddam's co-defendants were:

- Barzan Ibrahim al-Tikriti, his half-brother and former chief of intelligence
- Taha Yassin Ramadan, former Vice-President
- Awad Hamed al-Bandar Al-Sa'dun, a former chief judge
- Abdullah Kadhem Roweed Al-Musheikhi, Al-Dujail Ba'ath party official
- Mizher Abdullah Roweed Al-Musheikhi, (son of Abdullah Kadhem), Al-Dujail Ba'ath Party official
- Ali Daeem Ali, Al-Dujail Ba'ath Party official
- Mohammed Azawi Ali, Al-Dujail Ba'ath Party official

As in his pre-trial appearance, at the opening of the 19 October trial, Saddam appeared defiant. He rejected the tribunal's legitimacy and independence from the control of the foreign occupation. "I do not respond to this so-called court, with all due respect to its people, and I retain my constitutional right as the president of Iraq", Saddam declared. He added, "Neither do I recognize the body that has designated and authorized you, nor the aggression because all that has been built on false basis is false." When the judge asked for his name, Saddam refused, stating "I am the president of Iraq". He returned the question, asking Kurdish judge Rizgar Mohammed Amin, "Who are you? I want to know who you are." When Amin addressed Saddam as "the former president", Saddam objected emphatically.

The first session of Saddam's trial lasted three hours. The court adjourned the case until 28 November 2005, as some of the witnesses were too frightened to attend, and to allow the defense more time to study evidence. During an interview with the Arab news agency Al Arabiya following the opening of the trial, Saddam's eldest daughter Raghad branded the court a "farce" and claimed that her father behaved like a "lion" during the proceedings. "He would be a lion even when caged. Every honest person who knows Saddam knows that he is firm and powerful."

The trial was adjourned on 28 November 2005 by Chief Judge Rizgar Mohammed Amin to allow time to find replacement lawyers for several of the defendants; Attorney Saadoun Sughaiyer al-Janabi, charged with the defense of Awad Hamed al-Bandar, was abducted from his office by gunmen on 20 October 2005, and found shot dead near his office a few hours later. On 8 November 2005, attorney Adel al-Zubeidi, who had been representing Vice President Taha Yassin Ramadan and Abdullah Kazim Ruwayyid, was killed by three gunmen in Baghdad. Barazan Ibrahim's lawyer Thamer Hamoud al-Khuzaie was also wounded in the attack.

There were several incidents during the trial where Saddam showed defiance against the court's authority. At one point, Saddam's legal defense team stormed out of the court after questioning the tribunal's legitimacy, and asking about the return of defense papers seized by U.S. troops and security issues regarding the protection of the defense. Saddam, along with his co-defendants, railed against Chief Judge Amin and the tribunal. The next day, after listening to hours of testimony against him, he lashed out at the judge. He said that he was exhausted, he did not intend on returning to the trial, and to "go to hell". Later, on 7 December 2005, Saddam refused to enter court, complaining of the conditions in which he was being held and the conduct of the trial. Saddam's complaints included, among other things, that he had not been able to change his clothes for four days. On 12 December 2005, instead of cross-examining witnesses, Saddam accused his American captors of torturing him, saying, "I have been beaten on every place of my body, and the signs are all over my body."

On 29 January 2006, the trial was thrown in disarray after a courtroom session in which Saddam's half-brother Barzan Ibrahim al-Tikriti was dragged away by guards, the defense team walked out, and Saddam was ejected following a slanging match with chief judge Rauf Rashid Abd al-Rahman, who had replaced former chief judge Rizgar Amin, who resigned after complaining of government interference.

Chief Prosecutor Jaafar al-Moussawi called for the death penalty for Saddam and four other defendants including Barzan al-Tikriti, Saddam's half-brother, Taha Yassin Ramadan, former Iraqi Vice President and Awad Hamed al-Bander, former chief judge of Saddam's Revolutionary Court. The suspects faced execution by hanging if convicted and sentenced to death.

Following the assassination of his chief defense lawyer, Khamis al-Obeidi, Saddam began a hunger strike, protesting against the lack of international protection for lawyers, with the strike lasting 19 days.

=== Verdict: 5 November 2006 ===
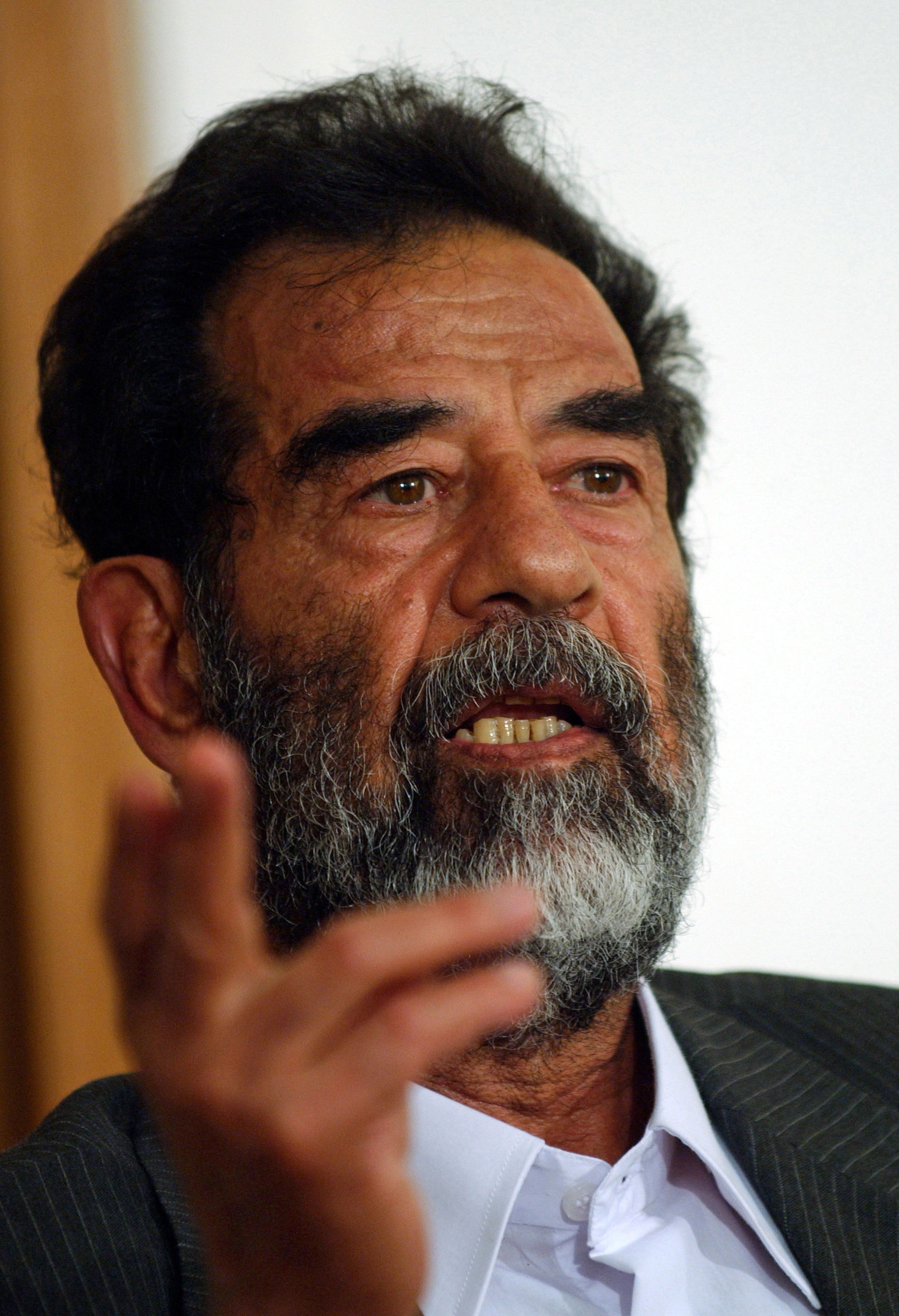
Saddam Hussein at his appearance before the Iraqi Special Tribunal on 1 July 2004; he went on trial on 19 October 2005.

On 5 November 2006, Saddam Hussein was sentenced to death by hanging for the killing of 148 Shiites from Dujail in retaliation for the assassination attempt of 8 July 1982. When the judge announced the verdict, Saddam shouted, "Long live the people. Long live the Ummah. Down with the spies. God is great." Chief defense lawyer Khalil al-Dulaimi later quoted a statement from Saddam given just before the Court issued its verdict. He said that Saddam urged his countrymen to "unify in the face of sectarian strife". Al-Dulaimi added that Saddam's message to the people was to "pardon and do not take revenge on the invading nations, its civilians". An appeal, mandated by the Iraqi judicial system, followed. There was speculation that appeals could delay his execution for years. However, on 26 December, Saddam's appeal was rejected and the death sentence was given. No further appeals were possible and Saddam had to be executed within 30 days of that date. The decision still had to be ratified by the Iraqi President but could not be commuted. Arif Shaheen, one of the nine appeal judges, said, "It cannot exceed 30 days. As from tomorrow the sentence could be carried out at any time. The appeals court has issued its verdict. What we have decided today is compulsory."

On 30 December 2006 at approximately 05:50 local time (UTC+03:00), Saddam was executed by hanging.

Among Saddam's co-defendants, Barzan Ibrahim al-Tikriti, his half-brother and Iraq's intelligence chief at the time of the Dujail killings, and Awad Hamed al-Bandar, who had issued death sentences to Dujail residents as head of a Revolutionary Court, were also sentenced to death by hanging. They were executed on 15 January 2007. Former Iraqi vice-president Taha Yassin Ramadan was sentenced to life in prison. However, on 12 February 2007, the sentence was changed to death by hanging, and Ramadan was executed on 20 March 2007.

Former Ba'ath Party officials in the Dujail region Abdullah Kadhem Roweed Al-Musheikhi, his son Mizher Abdullah Roweed Al-Musheikhi, and Ali Daeem Ali were sentenced to 15 years in prison. Mohammed Azawi Ali, also a Ba'ath Party official in Dujail region, was acquitted due to a lack of evidence.

== Execution ==
Saddam was executed by hanging after being convicted of crimes against humanity following his trial and conviction for the illegal killings of 148 Shi'ites in the town of Dujail in 1982. He was hanged on the first day of an important Islamic holiday, Eid ul-Adha, 30 December 2006, at approximately 06:05 AM local time (03:05 UTC). The execution was carried out at "Camp Justice," an Iraqi Army base in Kazimain, a neighborhood of north-east Baghdad.

== Reactions ==
=== Reactions to the verdict ===
Iraq: President Jalal Talabani said in a statement, "I think this trial was fair", and "I must respect the independence of the Iraqi judiciary. Until the end I must be silent." Prime Minister Nouri al-Maliki said the sentence may "help alleviate the pain of the widows and the orphans, and those who have been ordered to bury their loved ones in secrecy, and those who have been forced to suppress their feelings and suffering, and those who have paid at the hands of torturers" under Saddam's regime. First Deputy Speaker of the Iraqi National Assembly Khaled al-Attiyah said "we expected the maximum penalty against the criminal Saddam Hussein and his henchmen because they committed horrible crimes against the Iraqi people, the Arabs, Kurds, Muslims and the entire Western community."

Australia: Prime Minister John Howard said, "They could've easily allowed him to be arbitrarily executed as has happened in so many other countries, yet no, he could've been shot ... or something like that, but no, they were determined to have a transparent trial; they were determined to demonstrate to the world that there was a new Iraq." Howard said he was opposed to the death penalty, but could not govern what another country did. Howard stated that the death penalty is not the issue of significance. "The real issue is that he was tried in an open, transparent fashion and one of the great marks of democratic society is due process and the rule of law and this mass murderer was given due process."

Belgium: Belgian Foreign Minister Karel De Gucht believed that carrying out the death penalty on a 69-year-old would be "unethical", as reported by flandersnews.be. Meanwhile, Prime Minister Guy Verhofstadt told the press that "justice has been done", although a spokesman for the Prime Minister later said that Verhofstadt felt that it would have been better to have tried Saddam Hussein at the International Criminal Court in The Hague.

Canada: Foreign Affairs Minister Peter MacKay said "my understanding is there is an appeal process to follow, so given that fact, I think it would be pre-emptive to be passing any judgments or making any firm public declarations until all of those avenues have been exhausted."

Egypt: President Hosni Mubarak warned against the death penalty for Saddam, stating that "Carrying out this verdict will explode violence like waterfalls in Iraq," and that "the verdict will transform [Iraq] into blood pools and lead to a deepening of the sectarian and ethnic conflicts."

Hamas: A spokesman for Hamas condemned Saddam's sentencing, stating that "We as the Palestinian people support whoever supports our people, and president Saddam Hussein was one of those," that "there was not a fair trial and those who judged him were those who participated in the affair of the Abu Ghraib prison and crimes in Palestine," and that "the trial took place under American occupation of Iraq."

India: External Affairs Minister Pranab Mukherjee reacted guardedly to the death sentence, saying such verdicts should not appear to be "victor's justice" and should be acceptable to the people of Iraq and the international community. In a statement, he said "such life and death decisions require credible due process of law."

Ireland: A spokesperson for the Foreign Affairs Minister said "Ireland and its EU partners have made it clear in the past to Iraqi authorities that we are opposed to courts applying the death sentence."

Italy: Prime Minister Romano Prodi said "While not wishing to play down the crimes... I cannot but express the firm opposition of the Italian government - as well as mine - to a death sentence. As I reiterated again today (27 December 2006) at the cabinet meeting, Italy is opposed to capital punishment, always and in all cases. It is a general principle that I reiterated firmly also at the United Nations."

New Zealand: Prime Minister Helen Clark stated that the guilty verdict was appropriate but that she has "a long-standing objection to the death penalty and that will always be a concern to me." She declined to make a comment on whether the trial was fair, saying it was hard to determine from so far away.

Russia: Foreign affairs committee member Konstantin Kosachev made a cautious statement, saying he doubted the death penalty would be carried out. He said, "this is more of a moral ruling, revenge that modern Iraq is taking on the Saddam Hussein regime."

United Kingdom: Foreign Secretary Margaret Beckett said "it is right that those accused of such crimes against the Iraqi people should face Iraqi justice." Prime Minister Tony Blair stated that he is "against the death penalty, whether it is Saddam Hussein or anybody else."

United States: White House Press Secretary Tony Snow said the trial showed "absolute proof" that the judiciary in Iraq are independent. President George W. Bush in a statement said, "Saddam Hussein's trial is a milestone in the Iraqi people's efforts to replace the rule of a tyrant with the rule of law", and "today, the victims of this regime have received a measure of the justice which many thought would never come."

Vatican City: The head of the Vatican's Council for Justice and Peace, Cardinal Renato Raffaele Martino, opposed the death sentence for Saddam, saying, "For me, punishing a crime with another crime – which is what killing for vindication is – would mean that we are still at the point of demanding an eye for an eye, a tooth for a tooth."

Zimbabwe: The Zimbabwe Exiles Forum in South Africa welcomed Saddam's death sentence, and hoped it sent a message to Zimbabwe's dictator Robert Mugabe, as well as deposed dictators Augusto Pinochet of Chile and former Liberian dictator Charles Taylor, saying:

"[We] believe that together with the Pinochet, Taylor, and other recent cases, this case sends an unequivocally clear and resounding message to dictators and perpetrators of serious crimes under international and national laws. [We] hope that this loud message will not escape the ears of tyrants like President Robert Mugabe of Zimbabwe and all those who serve under him in the commission of torture and other crimes against humanity."

=== Criticism ===
Critics, including Saddam's legal counsel Khalil al-Dulaimi, alleged that U.S. officials had a heavy influence on the court. In a statement, Khalil said, "this court is a creature of the US military occupation, and the Iraqi court is just a tool and rubber stamp of the invaders."

Khalil al-Dulaimi and various international commentators alleged that the date on which the verdict was read live to the world, 5 November 2006, was deliberately selected by the Bush administration in order to influence the U.S. midterm elections which occurred two days later. This has been called a November Surprise. The verdict was expected to be on 16 October 2006, but was postponed to consider recalling some of the witnesses. Even as the verdict was released verbally on 5 November, the written, the final verdict was not released until days later.

The Washington Post reported that "Americans have drafted most of the statutes under which Hussein and his associates are being tried". It also reported that "A US official in Baghdad confirmed last weekend that only the United States and Britain had contributed experts to advise the court on how to prosecute governments for war crimes and other such matters".

Former prosecutor Vincent Bugliosi criticized the prosecution's choice to focus on the Dujail massacre, writing "it appears Hussein did not commit the crime of murder here" and alleging no evidence that Saddam knowingly executed innocent people or that those killed had not been part of the conspiracy to assassinate him, and that not giving the victims due process was irrelevant to the question of whether he was guilty of murder.

Human rights organization Amnesty International criticized the death sentence and said the trial was "deeply flawed and unfair." The process was marred by "serious flaws that call into question the capacity of the tribunal," Malcolm Stuart, director of Amnesty's Middle East and North Africa program, said. "In particular, political interference undermined the independence and impartiality of the court." The specific concerns raised by Amnesty International included the status of the trial as a "Special Trial" (unconstitutional according to the Iraqi Constitution), political interference in trial proceedings by the removal of a judge mid-trial, exclusion of members of the defense team at points in the trial, assassination of multiple members of the defense team, and the closure of the trial before the defense team had completed presenting its legal case.

In the opening statement of the Jury of Conscience of the World Tribunal on Iraq, keynote speaker Arundhati Roy retorted, "Saddam Hussein is being tried as a war criminal even as we speak. But what about those who helped to install him in power, who armed him, who supported him—and who are now setting up a tribunal to try him and absolve themselves completely?"

== Legacy and long-term effects ==
Journalist Mohamad Bazzi wrote in 2014 that Hussein's trial and execution deepened sectarianism in Iraq:

The vengeful and sectarian way in which Hussein was killed deepened the civil war that had been raging inside Iraq since early 2006—Sunni violence against Shiites, followed by Shiite reprisals. And if there wasn’t a deep-rooted Sunni-Shiite rift in the region before Hussein’s hanging, there certainly was one after. In the days following his execution, Hussein emerged as a Sunni Arab hero who stood calm and defiant as his Shiite executioners tormented him. No one will ever forget the way in which Saddam was executed", then–Egyptian President Hosni Mubarak told the Israeli newspaper Yediot Aharonot. "They turned him into a martyr". ...

Sunnis framed the hasty execution as an act of sectarian vengeance, shrouded in political theater and overseen by the American occupation. In several Arab capitals, Sunni protesters railed against the United States, Israel, and "Persians"—a code word for Shiites. Sunnis across the region saw the United States and the Shiite-dominated Iraqi government as killing off the last vestiges of Arab nationalism. ...

And in death, a new narrative emerged about the Iraqi dictator: that he had blocked Iranian dominance of the region, and had stood up to Israel.

== See also ==
- 2003 invasion of Iraq
- Execution of Saddam Hussein
- Show trial
- Victor's justice
