= Execution of Saddam Hussein =

2006 execution of the former Iraqi president

- Part of the Iraq War
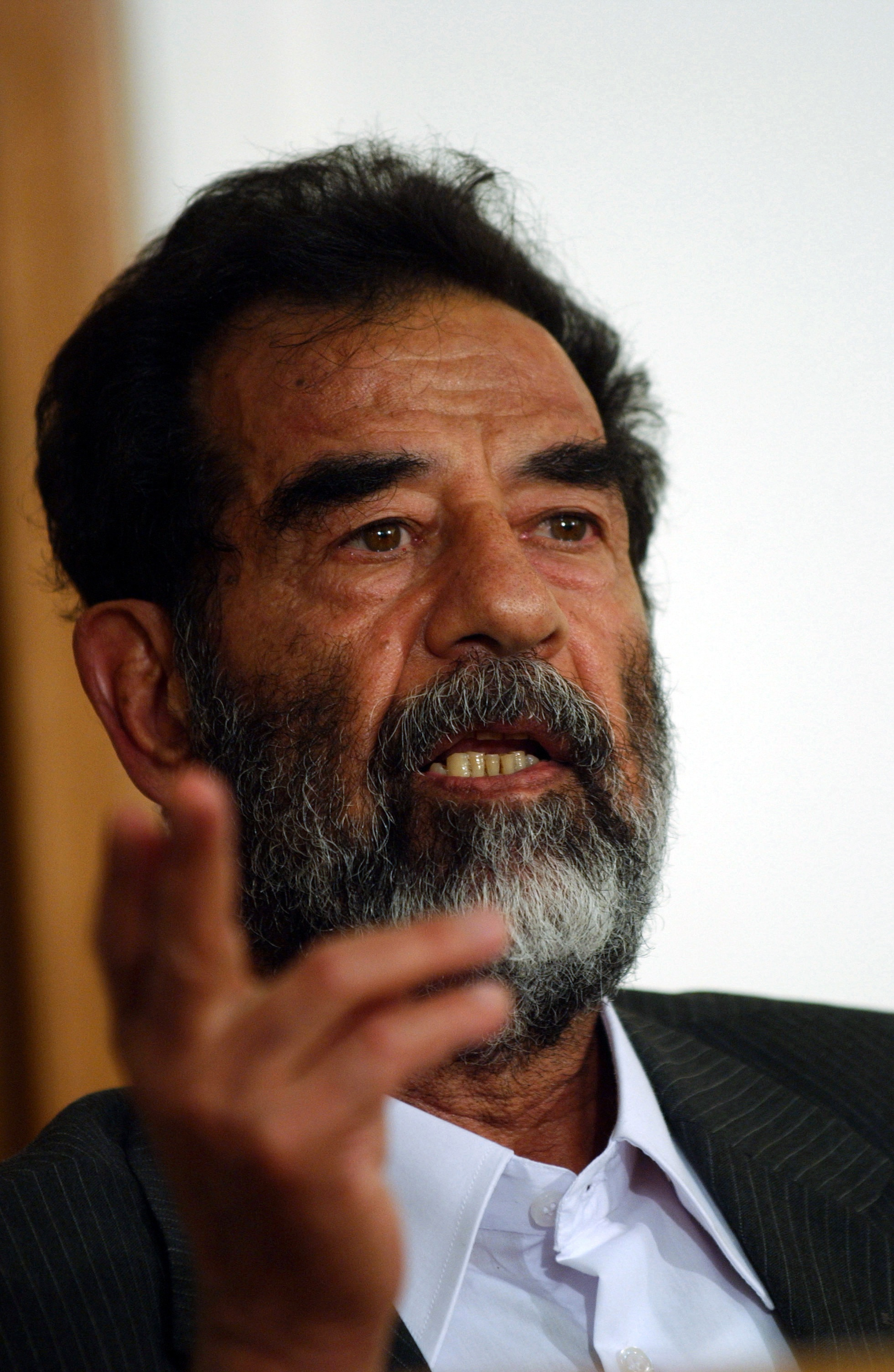
- Saddam during his first court appearance in 2004
- Date: 30 December 2006; 19 years ago
- Time: c. 05:50–06:10
- Venue: Camp Justice, Kadhimiya, Baghdad, Iraq

Saddam Hussein, the former president of Iraq, was executed on 30 December 2006. Saddam was sentenced to death by hanging, after being convicted of crimes against humanity by the Iraqi Special Tribunal for the Dujail massacre—the killing of 148 Iraqi Shi'ites in the town of Dujail, in 1982, in retaliation for a purported assassination attempt on Saddam.

The Iraqi government released an official video of his execution, showing him being led to the gallows, and ending after the hangman's noose was placed over his head. International public controversy arose when a mobile phone recording of the hanging showed him surrounded by a contingent of his countrymen, who jeered him in Arabic and praised the Shia cleric Muqtada al-Sadr, and his subsequent fall through the trap door of the gallows.

Saddam's body was returned to his birthplace of Al-Awja, near Tikrit, on 31 December and was buried near the graves of other family members.

Kurds in Iraqi Kurdistan marked the period from 30 December 2006 to 1 January 2007 as a three-day Eid celebration commemorating the execution of Saddam Hussein, consisting of Eid al-Adha and the New Year.

== Background ==
After being sentenced to death by an Iraqi court, Saddam asked to be executed by firing squad instead of hanging, claiming it as the lawful military capital punishment and citing his former position of commander-in-chief of the Iraqi military. This request was denied by the court. Two days before the execution, a letter written by Saddam appeared on the Arab Socialist Ba'ath Party website. In the letter, he urged the Iraqi people to unite, and not to hate the people of countries who invaded Iraq, such as the United States, but instead those countries' decision makers. He said he was ready to die as a martyr and that he was at peace with his death sentence. Hours before the execution, Saddam ate his last meal, of chicken and rice with a cup of hot water with honey.

== Execution ==
=== Time and place ===
Saddam was executed by hanging about 05:50 UTC +03:00 on the first day of Eid al-Adha (30 December 2006). Reports conflicted as to the exact time of the execution, with some sources reporting the time as 06:00, 06:05, or some as late as 06:10.

The execution took place at the joint Iraqi-U.S. military base Camp Justice, in Kazimain, a north-eastern suburb of Baghdad. Contrary to initial reports, Saddam was executed alone, not at the same time as his co-defendants Barzan Ibrahim al-Tikriti and Awad Hamed al-Bandar, who were executed on 15 January 2007. Saddam's cousin Ali Hassan al-Majid was also sentenced to death and was hanged on 25 January 2010.

=== Proceedings ===
A senior Iraqi official who was involved in the events leading to Saddam's demise was quoted as saying, "The Americans wanted to delay the execution by 15 days because they weren't keen on having him executed right away, but during the day [before the execution] the prime minister's office provided all the documents they asked for and the Americans changed their minds when they saw the prime minister was very insistent. Then it was just a case of finalizing the details." U.S. military spokesman Maj. Gen. William Caldwell told journalists in Baghdad that after "physical control" of Saddam was given to the Iraqi government, "the multinational force had absolutely no direct involvement with [the execution] whatsoever." There were no U.S. representatives present in the execution chamber.

Reports circulated that Saddam's behavior was "submissive" and that he was carrying the Qur'an he had been keeping with him throughout his trial before his execution. Iraqi National Security Advisor Mowaffak al-Rubaie, who was a witness to Saddam's execution, described Saddam as repeatedly shouting "down with the invaders". Al-Rubaie reportedly asked Saddam if he had any remorse or fear, to which Saddam replied:

No, I am a militant and I have no fear for myself. I have spent my life in jihad and fighting aggression. Anyone who takes this route should not be afraid.

Some witnesses described Saddam as appearing "broken and weak" yet "unrepentant" before his hanging. Other witnesses described Saddam as calm and defiant yet scornful with his captors. Sami al-Askari, a witness to the execution, said, "Before the rope was put around his neck, Saddam shouted, 'Allahu Akbar. The Muslim Ummah will be victorious and Palestine is Arab!'" Saddam also stressed that the Iraqis should fight the American invaders. After the rope was secured, guards shouted various rebukes including "Muqtada! Muqtada! Muqtada!" in reference to Muqtada al-Sadr; Saddam laughed, repeating the name mockingly and rebuked the shouts stating, "Do you consider this bravery?" A Shi'a version of an Islamic prayer was recited by some of those present in the room while Saddam recited a Sunni version of an Islamic prayer. One observer told Saddam:

Go to hell!

Saddam replied,

The hell that is Iraq?

In response to the heckling of one of the masked guards (the man who said "You have destroyed us, you have killed us. You have made us live in destitution!"), Saddam replied: "I have saved you from destitution and misery and destroyed your enemies, the Persians and Americans."

The deputy prosecutor, Munqith al-Faroun, responded to hecklers, stating,

Please, stop. The man is facing an execution.

Saddam began to recite the Shahada twice. Before finishing his second recitation, the trapdoor sprang. His last word was, "Muhammad." According to The New York Times, the executioners "cheer their Shi'ite heroes so persistently that one observer [in the execution chambers] makes a remark about how the effort to rein in militias does not seem to be going well." An observer shouted "The tyrant has fallen!" During the drop, there was an audible crack, indicating that Saddam's neck was broken. After Saddam was suspended for a few minutes, the doctor present listened with a stethoscope for a heartbeat. After he detected nothing, the rope was cut, and the body was placed in a coffin. Saddam was confirmed dead at 06:03.

=== Postmortem stabbings ===
According to Talal Misrab, the head guard at Saddam's tomb, who also helped in the burial, Saddam was stabbed six times after he was executed. The head of Saddam's tribe, Sheikh Hasan al-Neda, denies this claim. Mowaffak al-Rubaie stated, "I oversaw the whole process from A–Z and Saddam Hussein's body was not stabbed or mutilated, and he was not humiliated before execution."

== Burial ==
Saddam's body was buried in his birthplace of Al-Awja in Tikrit, Iraq, near family members, including his two sons Uday and Qusay Hussein, on 31 December 2006 at 04:00 local time (01:00 GMT). His body was transported to Tikrit by a U.S. military helicopter, where he was handed over from Iraqi government possession to Sheikh Ali al-Nida, the late head of the Albu Nasir tribe and governor of Saladin. He was buried about three kilometers (2 mi) from his two sons' bodies, in the same extensive cemetery. Saddam's grave, in a family plot, was dug into the floor of an octagonal, domed building he had ordered the construction of in the 1980s for religious festivals at the site.

Saddam's eldest daughter Raghad, under asylum in Jordan, had asked that "his body be buried in Yemen temporarily until Iraq is liberated and it can be reburied in Iraq", a family spokesperson said by telephone. The family also said his body might be buried in Ramadi, citing safety concerns, though there are no plans to do this. The tomb where Saddam's body was buried was later destroyed during fighting between Islamic State militants and Iraqi forces. Saddam's body had reportedly been removed by a Sunni tribal group before the tomb's destruction.

== Media coverage ==
The primary news source for the execution was the state-run Iraqi television news station Al Iraqiya, whose announcer said that the "criminal Saddam was hanged to death". A scrolling headline read, "Saddam's execution marks the end of a dark period of Iraq's history". Al Arabiya reported that Saddam's lawyer had confirmed Saddam's death.

Major news networks carried official video of the moments leading up to Saddam's execution. The Iraqi government also released pictures of Saddam's dead body in a shroud.

=== Recording ===
Official video of the event stopped short of showing the moment of hanging. A low-quality, amateur video shot on a cellphone from a staircase leading to the gallows surfaced and showed the entire hanging. The amateur video, unlike the official video, included the sound of witnesses taunting Saddam at the gallows, to which the former president replied "God damn you."

On 3 January 2007, the Iraqi government arrested the guard who they believed made the mobile-phone video, which had spread across the Internet. Mowaffak al-Rubaie later held a press conference, where he announced that three arrests had been made in connection with the investigation into the video recording and leak.

The video was spread on the Internet and on DVD.

== Reaction ==
Reactions to the execution were varied. Criticism came both from Saddam's supporters, who believed it was unjust, and non-supporters, who either wanted additional judgement regarding other crimes besides those he was convicted for and those who approved of his conviction but not of capital punishment. Some supporters considered him a martyr.

=== Copycat hangings ===
There were reports of copycat deaths influenced by the media coverage. Sergio Pelico, a 10-year-old boy in Webster, Texas, United States, hanged himself in his bedroom. His mother stated that the boy had previously watched a news report about Saddam's execution and decided to hang himself as a form of experimentation. In Multan, Pakistan, a 9-year-old boy also died apparently copying the televised execution; his 10-year-old sister assisted with the hanging. A 15-year-old girl from Kolkata, India, was reported to have hanged herself after becoming extremely depressed by watching the execution. Copycat hangings were blamed for the deaths of seven people worldwide.

== Legality ==
Human Rights Watch issued a statement that the "execution follows a flawed trial and marks a significant step away from the rule of law in Iraq". Amnesty International issued a statement that it "opposed the death penalty in all circumstances but it was especially egregious when this ultimate punishment is imposed after an unfair trial". Two days before the execution, the International Federation of Human Rights released a statement calling upon the head of state to issue a moratorium on the death sentence pronounced against Saddam by hanging. The organization also said Saddam should be treated as a prisoner of war under the Geneva Conventions. Lawyers for Saddam called the trial "a flagrant violation of international law" and plan to continue "using all legal paths available locally and internationally until public opinion gets the truth about this political assassination". In a separate statement, Saddam's American defense lawyer called the execution "an unfortunate display of arrogant aggressor's justice by the United States of America under the leadership of American President George W. Bush. It sets back achievements in international criminal law many decades and sends a clear message to people all over the world that the United States' aggression cannot be stopped by the law. It is truly a sad day for international justice and sad beginning to a new year." Juan Cole said that the execution might lead to more sectarian turmoil. "The trial and execution of Saddam were about revenge, not justice. Instead of promoting national reconciliation, this act of revenge helped Saddam portray himself one last time as a symbol of Sunni Arab resistance, and became one more incitement to sectarian warfare", he said.

However, other legal experts disagreed with these assertions and claims. Miranda Sissons, at the time an independent observer of the trial and a senior associate at the International Center for Transitional Justice, stated, "This was not a sham trial", and added the Iraqi judges presiding over the trial did "their best to try this case to an entirely new standard for Iraq". Jonathan Drimmer, winner of the first U.S. Department of Justice Assistant Attorney General Award for Human Rights Law Enforcement and a teacher at Georgetown University Law Center in Washington, D.C., when asked if the trial met the standards of international justice said, "The answer is no. But to look at the ultimate verdict, it certainly is consistent with the evidence presented", and further added the trial was both "a transparent proceeding" and "a major step for Iraq". Michael Scharf, a professor at Case Western Reserve University School of Law at the time, who also advised the Iraqi tribunal during the trial, responding to accusations by Saddam's defense team stated, "The U.S. government was not the puppet master of this tribunal" and added, "Saddam was convicted on the strength of his own documents", referring to documents signed by Saddam himself approving execution orders.

== Perception of the Iraqi government ==
After the leaking of mobile phone footage of Saddam Hussein's execution, along with the detention on 3 January 2007, of a guard under the Justice Ministry headed by Sunni Iraqi minister Hashim Abderrahman al-Shibli, suspicions have arisen that the ministry may have intended to inflame sectarian tensions. In an interview with La Repubblica on 19 January 2007, Muqtada al-Sadr said that the people who were in the room during execution were "people paid to discredit him" and the purpose of the unofficial video was to "make Muqtada look like the real enemy of the Sunnis".

U.S. President George W. Bush mentioned on 4 January 2007 that he wished that the execution "had gone on in a more dignified way". Bush later stated, in a 16 January 2007 interview with U.S. television host Jim Lehrer, that Saddam's execution "looked like it was kind of a revenge killing". Bush said he was "disappointed and felt like they fumbled the Saddam Hussein execution. It reinforced doubts in people's minds that the Maliki government and the unity government of Iraq is a serious government. And it sent a mixed signal to the American people and the people around the world."

== See also ==
- Killing of Muammar Gaddafi
- Killing of Osama Bin Laden
- Killing of Qusay and Uday Hussein
- Assassination of Ali Khamenei
- List of heads of state and government who were sentenced to death
