= Barzan Ibrahim al-Tikriti =

Iraqi Mukhabarat leader (1951–2007)

Barzan Ibrahim
- برزان إبراهيم
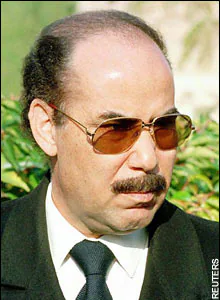
- Barzan in Baghdad, 2000

Personal details
- Born: 17 February 1951 Tikrit, Kingdom of Iraq
- Died: 15 January 2007 (aged 55) Camp Justice, Kadhimiya, Baghdad, Iraq
- Cause of death: Decapitation due to botched execution by hanging
- Party: Arab Socialist Ba'ath Party
- Spouse: Ilham Khairallah
- Relations: Sabawi (brother); Watban (brother); Daham (half-brother); Saddam (half-brother); Khairallah (uncle and father-in-law); Abd al-Latif (uncle); Badra (aunt); Rafi (cousin); Hani (cousin)
- Children: Mohamed; Saja; Ali; Noor; Khawla; Thoraya
- Parents: Ibrahim al-Hassan; Subha Talfah

Military service
- Allegiance: Ba'athist Iraq
- Battles/wars: Iraq War

Barzan Ibrahim al-Hassan al-Tikriti (Arabic: برزان إبراهيم الحسن التكريتي; 17 February 1951 – 15 January 2007), also known as Barzan Hassan, was an Iraqi politician, diplomat and intelligence officer. He was one of three half-brothers of Saddam Hussein and served as the leader of the Iraqi Intelligence Service (Mukhabarat).

As the head of the Mukhabarat, he was responsible for ordering the killings of dissidents. Despite falling out of favour with Saddam at one time, he was believed to have been a close presidential adviser at the time of his capture by U.S. forces in 2003. On 15 January 2007, Barzan was hanged for crimes against humanity. He was decapitated by the hangman's rope after errors were made calculating his body weight and length of drop from the platform.

== Early and personal life ==
Barzan İbrahim al-Tikriti was born in 1951 (or 1950) in Tikrit. His full name was Barazan Ibrahim al-Tikriti, Barasan Ibrahem Alhassen. In 1968, he accompanied his half brother Saddam during the 17 July Revolution.

== Head of the Mukhabarat ==
Barzan was a leading figure in the Mukhabarat, the intelligence service that performed the role of secret police from the 1970s, and later took over as director. During his time in the secret police, Barzan played a key role in the Iraqi regime's execution of opponents at home and assassinations abroad. He was also known for his ruthlessness and brutality in purging the Iraqi military of anyone seen as disloyal.

Barzan became Iraq's representative to the United Nations in Geneva—including the UN Human Rights Committee—in 1989. He was in Geneva for almost a decade, during which he is believed to have managed clandestine accounts for Saddam's overseas fortune. Swiss intelligence services alleged that Barzan controlled the al Tikriti family's vast wealth through the canton of Ticino headquartered firm Mediterranean Enterprises Development Projects (MEDP). Swiss attorney Alain Bionda represented Barzan's interests in Switzerland. (Note: From 1996 to 2003 during the Oil for Food program, Swiss attorney and oil businessman Alain Bionda allegedly received large sums of the money generated from the Oil for Food program while the Iraqi government diverted funds from this program to non-food related items. Bionda strongly supports the Serbian businessman Philip Zepter, the United Kingdom's Conservative Party to which he coordinates money transfers from Russians including Alexander Temerko, Jean Goutchkov, who was the head of private banking at Société Générale in Geneva until spring of 2014, and Gennady Timchenko. Through Genii Energy and the Lotus Formula One team, Bionda is a business partner of Spaniard Gérard López who made a very large sum of money through his investment in Skype and is very close to Vladimir Putin.) In the 1990s, Swiss National Bank estimated Barzan's fortune at 462 million Swiss francs. Barzan's son, Muhammad, who was the Geneva representative of the Iraqi national airline Iraqi Airways, is the direct heir of the al Tikriti clan.

U.S. officials said Barzan was a member of "Saddam's Dirty Dozen", responsible for torture and mass murder in Iraq. Barzan was the five of clubs (queen of hearts according to CNN) in the U.S military's most-wanted Iraqi playing cards.

=== Human rights violations ===
Barzan was noted for his cruelty. According to Indict, a US-backed organisation based in London which advocated for Iraqi war crimes tribunal, he was personally responsible for murdering and torturing scores of innocent people, including the inhabitants of one entire village, while he was head of the secret service. He was said to have used methods such as whipping with electrical cords and would often oversee torture. During the trial one woman testified that after her arrest she was stripped naked and tied up by her feet before the intelligence chief kicked her in the chest repeatedly. Ahmed Hassan, another prosecution witness, described being taken to an interrogation facility in Baghdad and seeing a meat grinder for human flesh. He allegedly shot an agent of his for buying a bottle of duty-free wine without asking permission. He was known for holding a minimum of 90 people hostage, killing up to 380 of them. However, death certificates are only available for 148 of the potential deaths. This was thought to have occurred due to his Hussein's execution of a well-known Shiite leader, in which assassination attempts occurred against him, angering Barzan.

== Post-invasion ==
Barzan was among the leadership figures U.S. forces targeted during the Iraq War. In April 2003, warplanes dropped six satellite-guided bombs on a building in the Iraqi city of Ramadi, west of Baghdad, where he was thought to be. U.S. Army Special Forces captured Barzan alive on 17 April 2003; the news was publicly confirmed late summer 2003, with Barzan surrounded by a large entourage of bodyguards in Baghdad. He was turned over to Iraq's Interim Government on 30 June 2004, and arraigned on 1 July 2004.

== Trial and courtroom charges ==
Barzan's trial started on 19 October 2005. He was a defendant in the Iraq Special Tribunal's Al-Dujail trial, and Abd al-Semd al-Husseini was his defense counsel. In the first stage of the trial, Barzan stood before a five-judge panel for the Dujail Massacre. He was charged for crimes against humanity, simultaneously with seven other former high officials (Taha Yassin Ramadan, Saddam Hussein, Awad Hamed al-Bandar, Abdullah Kadhem Roweed Al-Musheikhi, Ali Daeem Ali, Mohammed Azawi Ali and Mizher Abdullah Roweed Al-Musheikhi). They were said to have ordered and overseen the killings, in July 1982, of more than 140 Shiite men from Dujail, a village 35 miles north of Baghdad. The men were allegedly killed in retribution after an 8 July 1982 attack on the presidential motorcade as it passed through the village. It was alleged that, in addition to the killings, hundreds of women and children from the town were jailed for years in desert internment camps, and that date palm groves, which sustained the local economy and were the families' livelihood, were destroyed.

During the first court session on 19 October 2005, Barzan pleaded not guilty. During his trial, he became known for his angry outbursts in court and was ejected on several occasions.

In the weeks following the first audience, serious security concerns for the defense team of Saddam and the other accused became apparent. On 21 October 2005, 36 hours after the first hearing, a group of unidentified armed men dragged one of the defense attorneys from his office in east Baghdad and shot him dead. A few days later, a second lawyer was killed in a drive-by shooting, and a third, injured in that attack, subsequently fled Iraq for sanctuary in Qatar.

As a result, calls for the trial to be held abroad were heard. The defense lawyers, supported by the Iraqi Bar Association, imposed a boycott on the trial until their security concerns were met with specific measures. A few days before the trial was to resume, the defense team announced that it had accepted offers of protection from Iraqi and U.S. officials and would appear in court on 28 November 2005. The agreement is said to have included the same level of protection offered to the Iraqi judges and prosecutors, with measures such as armored cars and teams of bodyguards.

After a short court session on 28 November 2005, during which some testimony regarding the killings in Dujail was presented, Judge Rizgar Mohammed Amin ordered a one-week adjournment until 5 December, to grant the defense teams time to find new counsel.

On 12 March 2006, the prosecutor announced that if Saddam Hussein and his seven co-defendants were sentenced to death in the Dujail case, the sentence would be carried out as soon as possible. Thus, the other cases for which they were indicted would not be heard in court. On 19 June 2006, the prosecutor asked the court, in his closing arguments, that the death penalty be imposed upon Barzan, Saddam, and Ramadan.

On 5 November 2006, Barzan was sentenced to death by hanging.

=== Appeals ===
A sentence of death or life imprisonment generates an automatic appeal. On 3 December 2006, the defense team lodged an appeal against the verdicts for Barzan, Saddam, and al-Bander, who had been sentenced to death. On 26 December 2006, the appeals chamber confirmed the verdict and the death sentence against Barzan.

In November 2006, Iraqi President Jalal Talabani appealed for Barzan to be moved to medical facilities to receive treatment for his spinal cancer. Barzan originally made an appeal from his cell to U.S. President George W. Bush and to Talabani for treatment, referring to the latter as an "old friend".

== Botched execution ==
On 15 January 2007, the death sentence was carried out. Barzan, along with co-defendants Saddam Hussein and the former chief justice of the Iraqi Revolutionary Court al-Bandar, were sentenced to death by hanging. Barzan was originally scheduled to hang on 30 December with Saddam (as he and al-Bandar wished) but due to the Eid, lack of time, and lack of a helicopter to deliver them, as well as international pressure, the hangings were postponed to 15 January. Barzan's sentence was carried out at 03:00 local time (00:00 UTC) on 15 January 2007. His death was confirmed at 3:05/00:05 UTC. Barzan was decapitated by the long drop, the accidental result of the hangman using a rope that was too long. As with Saddam's hanging, Barzan's and al-Bandar's counsel was not allowed to attend.

=== Reaction to the execution ===
On 15 January, U.S. secretary of state Condoleezza Rice said in a news conference with the Egyptian foreign minister: "We were disappointed there was not greater dignity given to the accused under these circumstances."

In a press briefing by British prime minister Tony Blair's official spokesman, in response to a question as to Blair's reaction to the "botched hanging" in Iraq, the spokesman said: "In terms of the death penalty in Iraq, our position on the death penalty is well known, and we had made that position known to the Iraqi Government again since the death of Saddam Hussein. However, Iraq is a sovereign Government, and therefore has a right under international law to decide its own policy on the death penalty."

Barzan's son-in-law, Azzam Saleh Abdullah, said: "We heard the news from the media. We were supposed to have the information a day earlier, but it seems that the government does not know the rules." He said the execution reflected the hatred felt by the Shiite-led government: "They still want more Iraqi bloodshed. To hell with democracy."

== See also ==
- Omar al-Tikriti – Barzan Ibrahim al-Tikriti's nephew
- Execution of Saddam Hussein
- Capital punishment in Iraq
- Hanging § Long drop
- U.S. list of most-wanted Iraqis
