= Tariq Aziz =

Iraqi politician (1936–2015)

- ܛܐܪܩ ܥܙܝܙ طارق عزيز
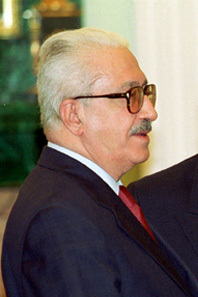
- Tariq Aziz in 2000

Deputy Prime Minister of Iraq
- In office 16 July 1979 – 9 April 2003
- Preceded by: Saadoun Ghaidan
- Succeeded by: Barham Salih

Minister of Foreign Affairs
- In office 11 November 1983 – 19 December 1991
- President: Saddam Hussein
- Preceded by: Sa'dun Hammadi
- Succeeded by: Mohammed Saeed al-Sahhaf

Member of the Revolutionary Command Council
- In office 16 July 1979 – 9 April 2003

Member of the Regional Command of the Iraqi Regional Branch
- In office 1 August 1965 – 9 April 2003

Personal details
- Born: 28 April 1936 Tel Keppe, Iraq
- Died: 5 June 2015 (aged 79) Nasiriyah, Iraq
- Cause of death: Heart attack
- Resting place: Madaba, Jordan
- Party: Arab Socialist Ba'ath (until 1966); Baghdad-based Ba'ath (1966–1982) (Ba'ath – Iraq Region)
- Spouse: Violet Yusef Nobud
- Children: 4
- Profession: Journalist, politician

Tariq Aziz (Syriac: ܛܐܪܩ ܥܙܝܙ, Arabic: طارق عزيز Ṭāriq ʿAzīz, 28 April 1936 – 5 June 2015) was an Iraqi politician and journalist who served as the Deputy Prime Minister of Iraq from 1979 to 2003 and Minister of Foreign Affairs from 1983 to 1991. He was a close advisor of President Saddam Hussein. Additionally, Aziz was a member of the Revolutionary Command Council and the Regional Command of the Iraqi Branch of the Ba'ath Party.

His association with Saddam began in the 1950s when both were activists for the then-banned Arab Socialist Ba'ath Party. Due to security concerns, Saddam rarely left Iraq, so Aziz would often be Iraq's highest-level representative at international and diplomatic summits. In the year prior to the 2003 invasion of Iraq, Aziz said that the United States did not want "regime change" in Iraq but rather "region change". He said that the Bush administration's reasons for war were "oil and Israel". After surrendering to American forces on 24 April 2003, Aziz was held in prison, first by American forces and subsequently by the new Iraqi government, in Camp Cropper in western Baghdad. He was acquitted at trial of some charges but was later found guilty of crimes against humanity and sentenced to 15 years in 2009 for the executions of 42 merchants found guilty of profiteering in 1992 and another 7 years for relocating Kurds.

On 26 October 2010, he was sentenced to death by the Iraqi High Tribunal, which sparked international condemnation from Iraqi bishops, other Iraqis, the Vatican, the United Nations, the European Union and the human rights organization Amnesty International, as well as various governments around the world, such as Russia. On 28 October 2010, it was reported that Aziz, as well as 25 fellow prison inmates, had begun a hunger strike to protest the fact that they could not receive their once-monthly visit from friends and relatives, which was normally set for the last Friday of each month. Iraqi President Jalal Talabani declared that he would not sign Aziz's execution order, thus commuting his sentence to indefinite imprisonment. Aziz remained in custody for the rest of his life and died of a heart attack in the city of Nasiriyah on 5 June 2015, aged 79, and was then sent to be buried in Jordan.

One of the most prominent figures during the Ba'athist era of Iraq, he was the sole Christian to hold a high position in Saddam's government.

== Early life and education ==
Aziz was born on 28 April 1936, near the city of Mosul in northern Iraq, to an Iraqi Assyrian family. He and his family were of the Chaldean Catholic Church. There are claims that he was born Mikhail or Michael Yuhanna (Syriac: ܡܝܟܐܝܠ ܝܘܚܢܢ Arabic: ميخائيل يوحنا) and later changed his name to Tariq Aziz (which denotes "glorious past") to gain acceptance by the Arab and Muslim majority. However, this was denied by his son.

He studied English at the University of Baghdad and later worked as a journalist, before joining the Ba'ath Party in 1957. During the 1950s, when Iraq was under the monarchical rule, Aziz along with other Ba'athists opposed the government. During the 1950s and 1960s, the United States showed limited interest in the Arab Socialist Party, which later became the Ba'ath Party, and its rise to power in Iraq. In this period, the U.S. was primarily concerned with the spread of Soviet communism around the world, particularly in the Middle East, rather than focusing on the internal politics of Arab countries.

== Political movement and activism ==
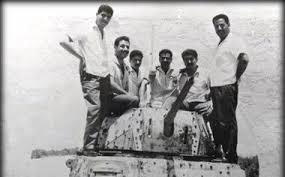
The Ba'athist after the coup in Iraq, 1963

According to Tariq Aziz, the U.S. did not perceive the Ba'ath Party as a significant force, either in Syria or Iraq, mainly because the U.S. lacked a deep understanding of Iraq’s political landscape. Aziz noted that while Britain and France had extensive historical involvement in the region, the United States did not have the same expertise and often viewed issues through a Cold War lens, concerned primarily with communism.

The Ba'ath Party first came to power in 1963 following the Iraq Revolution of 1958, a time when Tariq Aziz was serving as the editor-in-chief of the party's newspaper. Despite this significant political shift in Iraq, Aziz remarked that American diplomatic engagement with the country remained minimal. During the presidency of John F. Kennedy and later Lyndon B. Johnson, there was little meaningful interaction between Iraq and the U.S. government, with very few American journalists visiting Iraq compared to journalists from Britain, France, and the Soviet Union. In 1963, he was editor of the newspaper Al-Jamahir and Al-Thawra, the main newspapers of the Ba'ath party.

Following the coup against the Ba'ath Party regime in 1963, Aziz was imprisoned in Syria for over a year and did not have direct access to firsthand information during that time. However, he recalled that rumors circulated within the Iraqi government about CIA involvement in political and business circles in Iraq. While the involvement of CIA agents in Iraq was never conclusively proven at the time, Aziz later suggested that some of these agents may have had connections with Americans, and the presence of such figures was seen as suspicious by the Ba'ath Party leadership. However, Aziz emphasized that despite these rumors, the U.S. did not appear to take any direct or aggressive action in Iraq at that time, and Iraq did not view the CIA’s involvement as part of a larger, more significant American intervention in the country.

== Early Ba'ath Party rule ==
Aziz began to rise through the ranks of Iraqi politics after the Ba'ath party came to power in 1968. Aziz became close to Saddam who heavily promoted him. He became a member of the General Affairs Bureau of the Revolutionary Command Council. Aziz served as a member of the Regional Command, the Ba'ath Party's highest governing organization from 1974 to 1977, and in 1977 became a member of Saddam's Revolutionary Command Council. He also served as the Minister of Information from 1974 to 1977. He was also elected as a Baʿath Party regional leader. Aziz remarked that the U.S. began paying more attention to Iraq, especially amidst concerns over Soviet influence in the region. Despite Iraq’s alignment with the Soviet Union in some areas, Iraq’s leadership remained independent in its foreign policy, and the country did not seek to be part of the Soviet bloc. Aziz explained that while Iraq did not completely boycott the U.S., it primarily focused on relations with France and Europe, viewing them as more impartial regarding the Arab-Israeli conflict.

In the 1970s, the U.S. government, particularly under Henry Kissinger during the Nixon administration, expressed concerns about Iraq’s alliance with the Soviet Union, including unfounded claims about a Soviet military base in Iraq. These claims were refuted after Aziz facilitated a meeting between U.S. journalists and Vice President Saddam Hussein, who challenged the allegations. Despite these tensions, the diplomatic relationship remained limited, and the U.S. continued to view Iraq through the lens of its broader Cold War strategy rather than as a major Middle Eastern partner. In 1975, Aziz said Hussein had told David Rockefeller better relations would improve when the United States stopped interfering in Iraqi internal affairs.

By the time Saddam Hussein became vice president in the early 1970s, Iraq had taken bold steps to nationalize its oil industry, a move that was met with resistance from Western countries, including the United States, Britain, and the Netherlands. However, France, under President Georges Pompidou, was more supportive, signaling a key shift in Iraq's foreign policy. Iraq’s relations with France, and Europe more broadly, grew stronger during this period, as these nations took a more neutral stance on Iraq's oil nationalization and the broader Middle Eastern political situation. Aziz also reflected on the 1970s as a time when Iraq's main focus was on its economic development, with both Saddam Hussein and other key leaders like Aziz prioritizing the modernization of Iraq's industry, infrastructure, and education systems. Despite the challenges posed by the Iran-Iraq War, this vision of a highly developed, self-sufficient Iraq remained central to the Ba'ath Party’s goals.

In the late 1970s, during the Carter administration, there were persistent U.S. concerns regarding Iraq's potential alignment with the Soviet Union. Aziz recalled how the United States floated claims about Iraq being a pro-Soviet regime, specifically suggesting that Iraq hosted a Soviet airbase or naval base. To address these allegations, Aziz invited two prominent journalists from Time magazine to meet with then Vice President Saddam Hussein. Aziz mentioned to the journalists that they had information about a possible Soviet base in Iraq. In response, Saddam told the journalists to look for themselves to verify whether the claims were true. After their visit, the journalists found no evidence of any such Soviet installations, reaffirming that these claims were baseless.

During this period, diplomatic relations between the U.S. and Iraq were strained. In the aftermath of the 1967 Israeli-Arab war, many countries in the region, including Iraq and Egypt, severed their diplomatic ties with the United States. Iraq's diplomatic presence in Washington was minimal; rather than an official embassy, Iraq had an interest section—a practice that left Iraq's representation in the U.S. largely dormant. Aziz, at the time serving as the Minister of Information, emphasized that Iraq did not feel any significant American influence or concern during this period.

Under the leadership of Henry Kissinger as U.S. Secretary of State, there was growing discontent throughout the Middle East with U.S. foreign policy, especially due to U.S. support for Israel. Aziz noted that, during this period, the entire region, including Iraq, was increasingly leaning toward anti-American sentiment. As a result, Iraq's foreign relations were focused more on Europe and the Soviet Union, with these countries becoming increasingly important partners for Iraq during this time.

== Deputy Prime Minister ==
In 1979, Aziz became Deputy Prime Minister of Iraq, and worked as a diplomat to explain Iraq's policies to the world. He was the sole Christian holding a position of power during Saddam's rule.

=== Assassination attempt ===
In April 1980, there was an attempt to assassinate Aziz at the main gate of Al-Mustansiriya University while university students were gathered on both sides of the entrance to welcome him. A graduate of Al-Sadr Camp and a member of the Dawa Party threw a hand grenade at his motorcade. His bodyguards quickly surrounded him, but he sustained a hand injury from grenade shrapnel. Many university students near the gate were also injured, with red blood clearly visible on their white shirts, for the university's uniform for the hot days of April consisted of a white shirt and gray pants. However, an anonymous phone call to Pars News Agency claimed that Fada'iyan-e Islam was behind the attack. The Dawa Party had been particularly offended by the Christian affiliation of Tariq Aziz, and had always applied the Christian surname Hanna to his name – once even using the surname Tubia – and also hinted that he was Jewish. They accused Tariq Aziz, along with Michel Aflaq, of creating Ba'athism to destroy Islam in the Arab world.

After the incident, Saddam Hussein arrived at Al-Mustansiriya University and delivered a speech to the students, during which he said "We are dancing on the shoulders of death." At the time, the Iraqi government said that Iran backed the attack, and Saddam's government immediately accused the Dawa Party of orchestrating the attempt. It was an Iranian-backed assassination attempt. The attack killed several people. This incident formed part of the casus belli of the Iran–Iraq War. As the attempted assassin was a Feyli Kurd, the incident also formed the casus belli for the signing of Decree No. 666 which ordered the deportations of Iraqis of foreign origin.

=== Foreign relations ===
As Deputy Prime Minister of Iraq, Aziz played a key role in shaping the country's foreign policy, particularly in relation to the United States during a period of complex geopolitical dynamics. Following the Iran-Iraq War, Iraq sought to re-establish diplomatic relations with the U.S. under the leadership of President Saddam Hussein. Aziz’s involvement in this process is noted for his strategic approach to balancing Iraq’s relationships with both the Soviet Union and the U.S.

In 1979, during the Non-Aligned Movement summit in Havana, a decision was made that the next summit in 1982 would be held in Iraq. On the way back from Havana, President Hussein expressed his concerns to Aziz, stating, "We have very good relations with the Soviet Union, but we also need to appear non-aligned and engage with the superpowers, including the United States." Although Aziz was not yet the foreign minister, as deputy prime minister, he served as a key advisor on foreign policy matters and was entrusted with sensitive diplomatic responsibilities. The President tasked him with preparing for the resumption of diplomatic ties with the United States, while avoiding any haste, understanding that careful timing was crucial.

The outbreak of the Iran-Iraq War in 1980 complicated these plans. Initially, Aziz and the Iraqi leadership decided against pursuing any immediate contact with the U.S., fearing it would be misinterpreted as aligning with America against Iran. Instead, they focused on maintaining Iraq’s independence and military capacity. By 1982, after two years of war and as the political landscape shifted, Iraq began cautiously exploring the prospect of resuming ties with the U.S.

That year, the head of the American Interest Section in Baghdad requested an increase in the level of diplomatic contacts. Previously, communication between the U.S. and Iraq had been handled through the Iraqi Ministry of Foreign Affairs, but after the request, President Hussein authorized direct meetings between Aziz and U.S. diplomats. During this period, Aziz engaged in numerous discussions with American diplomats and congressional staff visiting Baghdad on fact-finding missions. This dialogue helped both sides better understand each other's positions on key issues, including the Arab-Israeli conflict and the war with Iran.

Aziz’s diplomatic efforts laid the groundwork for the eventual restoration of U.S.-Iraq relations in 1984, which was a significant shift in Iraq's foreign policy after years of tension with the United States.

== Minister of Foreign Affairs: 1983–1991 ==
=== Iran–Iraq War ===
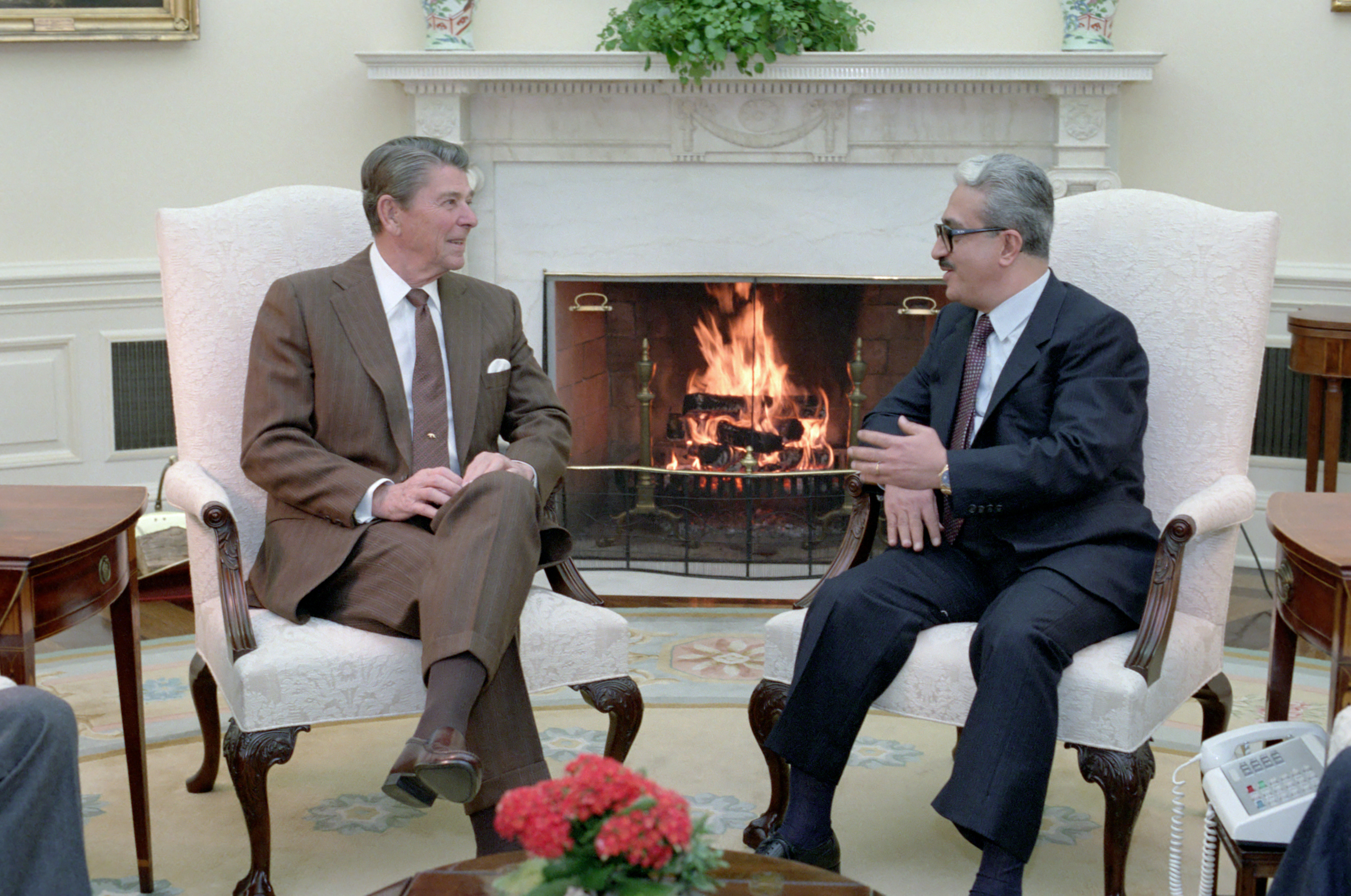
Ronald Reagan hosts Aziz at the White House, 1984

Since Saddam rarely left the country, he appointed Aziz as the minister of foreign affairs in 1983, replacing Sa'dun Hammadi. Aziz managed to win support from the United States during the Iran–Iraq War and met then United States president Ronald Reagan in 1984. Aziz accompanied Saddam during a visit on 19–20 December 1983 from Donald Rumsfeld, then Ronald Reagan's special envoy to the Middle East. Rumsfeld later became the American Secretary of Defense and led the coalition forces against Iraq in 2003.

India, which had good relations with both Iran and Iraq, maintained neutrality in the conflict and urged both sides to cease hostilities. The 7th Summit of the Non-Aligned Movement was to be held in New Delhi in 1983. On 9 February 1982, Aziz traveled to India, met the Indian Minister of External Affairs, P.V. Narasimha Rao and held talks regarding Iran's presence at the summit. Aziz said that he hoped Iran would attend the conference. The two countries had been at war for more than a year.

Aziz acknowledged that Iraq used chemical weapons in the war, but insisted that Iran was the first to use them.

He told reporters at the airport that Iraq sought an end to the 16-month war, along their border. Aziz was part of the Iraqi delegation led by Saddam. However, tight security was maintained, due to an assassination plan by the Islamic Dawa Party. Later, Aziz attended several Non-Aligned Movement summits, representing Iraq. Aziz negotiated with France to buy fighter planes and established an economic alliance with the former Soviet Union. In 1988 he traveled to Geneva, Switzerland, to negotiate a treaty to end the Iran-Iraq War.

=== Gulf War ===
After the war ended, tensions increased between Kuwait and Iraq, due to oil costs and debt. Aziz met Kuwaiti officials in an attempt to convince them to stop pumping excess oil. When Iraq invaded Kuwait in 1990, Aziz served as the international spokesman in support of the military action. He said the invasion was justified because Kuwait's increased oil production was harming Iraqi oil revenues. He condemned Arab states for "subservience to the United States' hegemony in the Middle East and their support for punitive sanctions." On 9 January 1991, Aziz was involved in the Geneva Peace Conference which included the United States Secretary of State, James Baker. The goal of the meeting was to discuss a possible resolution to the occupation of Kuwait.

As tensions escalated following the invasion of Kuwait on 2 August 1990, attention turned to Cairo after Egyptian president Hosni Mubarak called for an emergency summit on August 8 to discuss the crisis. The meeting was seen as a crucial moment in the unfolding Gulf crisis, as regional and international pressure mounted against Iraq. According to journalist Mohamed Hassanein Heikal, Mubarak made diplomatic efforts to de-escalate the situation. On the morning of 9 August, Mubarak summoned Iraqi Ambassador to Egypt Nabil Najm and asked him to deliver a verbal message to Saddam, advising that if Iraq could not attend the summit, it should at least send a high-level delegation willing to adopt a flexible approach. Later that day, Baghdad announced that a top-level Iraqi delegation was en route to Cairo. That evening, an Iraqi aircraft landed at Cairo Airport, carrying a delegation led by Taha Yassin Ramadan including Aziz.

Upon arrival, tensions arose immediately. Unlike other delegations, the Iraqi representatives were housed in a government guest palace rather than a hotel, which led Tariq Aziz to question the decision. He reportedly asked, "Why are we placed in a guest palace while all other delegations are in hotels?" Egyptian officials responded that the Iraqi delegation faced unique security concerns. Aziz remained skeptical; he asked, "Is this for our protection or to isolate us? If it is for our protection, we can take responsibility for ourselves. We trust the Egyptian people." An Egyptian official responded: "The issue is not with the Egyptian people, but with the tens of thousands of Kuwaitis now in Cairo."

Further tensions arose when only Taha Yassin was invited to meet President Mubarak on the evening of 9 August, excluding Aziz. Aziz objected, arguing that the delegation had arrived as a unified body and that he himself had a personal friendship with Mubarak. Despite his objections, the meeting proceeded as planned, with Ramadan attending alone. During their discussions, according to Heikal, Mubarak and Ramadan exchanged firm positions. Mubarak later said that Ramadan had insisted Iraq's annexation of Kuwait was "final and irreversible" and could not be subjected to Arab discussion. Meanwhile, Ramadan recounted that he had expressed Iraq's belief that certain Arab states had already aligned irreversibly with the U.S., though Iraq still had confidence in Mubarak’s leadership.

The delegation arrived in Cairo already suspicious of U.S. military movements in the region. The visit of U.S. Defense Secretary Dick Cheney to Jeddah, accompanied by General Norman Schwarzkopf, had raised alarms in Baghdad. The announcement that the nuclear-powered aircraft carrier USS Dwight D. Eisenhower was approaching the Suez Canal further heightened Iraqi fears that military action was imminent. According to Heikal, the summit seemed more like a public relations event than a decisive diplomatic initiative, reflecting the broader disarray within the Arab world at the time. The summit itself was chaotic. The Arab League General Secretariat, responsible for organizing the event, barely arrived in time, with Secretary-General Chedli Klibi and his aides landing in Cairo at the last minute. No official agenda had been prepared, adding to the confusion. The disorder that followed would ultimately mark a turning point in Iraq's diplomatic isolation in the lead-up to the Gulf War. Subsequently, Saddam ceased to make foreign visits and mostly sent either Aziz or Ramadan.

== Post-war: 1991–2003 ==
=== Compliance with sanctions ===
Aziz was deeply involved in Iraq's dealings with the United Nations Special Commission (UNSCOM), which was established to oversee Iraq's disarmament after the Gulf War. Throughout this period Aziz maintained a critical view of UNSCOM, particularly regarding its role in prolonging the sanctions imposed on Iraq by the United Nations Security Council (UNSC). From the outset, Aziz believed that UNSCOM was not solely focused on disarmament but was also a tool to hurt Iraq and extend the sanctions. He argued that by 1991, most of Iraq's banned weapons, including chemical and biological agents, had been destroyed—either by UNSCOM or unilaterally by Iraq. He maintained that by 1992, there were no remaining chemical or biological weapons in Iraq, and that all disarmament tasks had been completed, but UNSCOM did not acknowledge this.

In March 1992, Aziz attended a formal Security Council meeting in New York and presented evidence to support his claim that Iraq had fully complied with the disarmament terms of Resolution 687. He suggested that the UN sanctions be reduced, arguing that Iraq had completed its obligations. However, despite presenting facts and figures showing the disarmament efforts, the UN Security Council refused to ease the sanctions. Aziz noted that instead of acknowledging Iraq's compliance, UNSCOM continued to make allegations about Iraq hiding weapons, even though no such weapons were found.

Aziz also criticized the leadership of UNSCOM, claiming that many of the inspectors, particularly those from the US and the UK, were not neutral professionals but were instead politically motivated to maintain the sanctions and conduct espionage. He believed that UNSCOM's mission had evolved into a political tool rather than a purely disarmament-focused effort. Throughout this period, Aziz maintained that the imposition of sanctions was unjust and that the work of UNSCOM, while initially aimed at disarming Iraq, was increasingly used to spy on Iraq and provide a pretext for continuing the sanctions regime. Despite Iraq’s compliance, Aziz felt that the UNSCOM operation had been hijacked by political interests, particularly from the US and UK, to serve broader geopolitical agendas rather than the actual goal of disarmament.

=== Representative of Iraq ===
Aziz attended a conference in February 2001 in Moscow. At the conference Russia Foreign Minister Igor Ivanov said that fighting terrorism should be based on solid legal foundations and that the UN should play the role of coordinator of international efforts. Aziz stressed that Iraq would not yield to U.S. threats, and claimed that Iraq had implemented all its commitments in line with UN Security Council resolutions. Gennadii Seleznev, speaker of the Russian State Duma, also met with Aziz and said that "Russia is resolutely against United States threats to strike Iraq as part of its war against terrorism," Interfax reported on 28 January. In return, Aziz said that "Iraq has never been a burden on the shoulders of either Russia or the Soviet Union. [Iraq] completely supports Russia on the issue of Chechnya, and this is no accident. Russia is our number one partner."

In April 2002, Aziz warned Russia that its economic interests with Iraq would be harmed if it agreed to the implementation of so-called "smart sanctions." This warning played a role in Russia blocking a United Nations Security Council resolution that would have authorized their application. In October 2002, during a visit to Ankara, he declared that Iraq would no longer consider Turkey a friendly state if it allowed its bases to be used by the United States in the event of an attack on Iraq. This statement contributed to the Turkish Parliament's decision in early March 2003 to reject a U.S. request on the matter.

=== Iraq War ===
In October 2000, the then-junior Minister for Foreign Affairs from Britain, Peter Hain, set up a secret war avoidance team to carry messages back and forth between himself and Aziz. After initial cooperation, Aziz rebuffed the delegations. He mounted a violent attack on President Bush and his ally, Tony Blair, characterising America in 2002 as the "dictator of the world".

On 14 February 2003, Aziz reportedly had an audience with Pope John Paul II and other officials in Vatican City, where, according to a Vatican statement, he communicated "the wish of the Iraqi government to co-operate with the international community, notably on disarmament". The same statement said that the Pope "insisted on the necessity for Iraq to faithfully respect and give concrete commitments to resolutions of the United Nations Security Council, which is the guarantor of international law".

=== Weapons of mass destruction ===
In September 2002, Kofi Annan met Saddam Hussein and Aziz. Aziz told that Iraq is ready to work with UN. He said: "As I told the [UN] secretary general, if anybody can have a magic solution, so that all these issues are being dealt with together, equitably and reasonably, we are ready to find such a solution and we are ready to cooperate with the United Nations,". Shortly after the invasion of Iraq, President George W. Bush claimed Aziz as one of the Iraqi regime who was responsible for hiding Iraqi WMD:

President Bush expressed unshakable confidence Saturday about finding banned weapons in Iraq and complained that Tariq Aziz, one of Saddam Hussein's closest deputies, is not cooperating with U.S. forces who have him in custody. Bush said the deputy prime minister, the most visible face of the former Iraqi government other than Hussein, 'still doesn't know how to tell the truth.'

— USA Today, 3 May 2003

== Trial, detention and death ==
=== Detention and defense witness ===
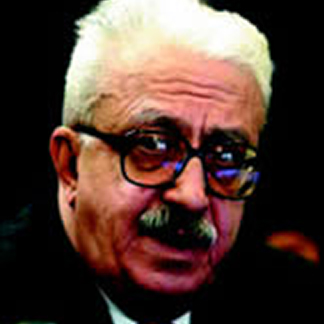
Aziz on the Most-Wanted Iraqi Playing Cards

He voluntarily surrendered to American forces on 24 April 2003, after negotiations had been mediated by his son. His chief concern at the time was for the welfare of his family. At the time of his surrender, Aziz was ranked number 43 out of 55 in the American list of most-wanted Iraqis despite a belief "he probably would not know answers to questions like where weapons of mass destruction may be hidden and where Saddam Hussein might be."

Before the war, Aziz claimed he would rather die than be a U.S. prisoner of war: "Do you expect me, after all my history as a militant and as one of the Iraqi leaders, to go to an American prison – to go to Guantanamo? I would rather die", he told Britain's ITV. On 24 May 2006, Aziz testified in Baghdad as a defence witness for Ibrahim Barzan and Mukhabarat employees, claiming that they did not have any role in the 1982 Dujail massacre. He stated that the arrests were in response to the assassination attempt on Saddam Hussein, which was carried out by the Shiite Dawa Party. "If the head of state comes under attack, the state is required by law to take action. If the suspects are caught with weapons, it's only natural they should be arrested and put on trial".

He further testified that the Dujail attack was "part of a series of attacks and assassination attempts by this group, including against me". He said that in 1980, Dawa Party insurgents threw a grenade at him as he visited a Baghdad university, killing civilians around him. "I'm a victim of a criminal act conducted by this party, which is in power right now. So put it on trial. Its leader was the prime minister and his deputy is the prime minister right now and they killed innocent Iraqis in 1980," he said. The Dawa Party is now a party in the Shiite coalition that dominates the Iraqi government. The party's leader, Ibrahim al-Jaafari, was prime minister until mid-May, when another leading Dawa Party figure, Nouri al-Maliki, was picked and he was able to form a new government before the end of May 2006. In his closing remarks, he stated that "Saddam is my colleague and comrade for decades, and Barzan is my brother and my friend and he is not responsible for Dujail's events."

=== Imprisonment ===
On 29 May 2005, the British newspaper The Observer published letters (in Arabic and English) from Aziz written in April and May 2005, while he was in American custody, addressed to "world public opinion" pleading for international help to end "his dire situation":

It is imperative that there is intervention into our dire situation and treatment ... We hope that you will help us. We have been in prison for a long time and we have been cut from our families. No contacts, no phones, no letters. Even the parcels sent to us by our families are not given to us. We need a fair treatment, a fair investigation and finally a fair trial. Please help us.

— Tariq Aziz, prison letter, April 2005

In August 2005, Aziz's family was allowed to visit him. At the time, the location of Aziz's prison was undisclosed; his family was transported in a bus with blackened windows. For security reasons he was later moved to Camp Cropper, part of the huge U.S. base surrounding Baghdad airport. His son said that while his father was in poor health, he was being well treated by prison officials. He could make 30 minutes of telephone calls monthly and had access to US Arabic-language radio and television stations. Every two months his family could send a parcel containing clothes, cigarettes, chocolate, coffee and magazines.

The spiritual leader of Iraq's Chaldean Catholic community, Emmanuel III Delly, called for Aziz's release in his 2007 Christmas message. Aziz was acquitted of crimes against humanity. On 17 January 2010, Aziz suffered a stroke and was transferred from prison to hospital. On 5 August 2010, The Guardian released his first face-to-face interview since his surrender. On 22 September 2010, documents were released that he had given an interview about how he had told the FBI that President Hussein was "delighted" in the 1998 terrorist bombings of two U.S. embassies in East Africa but had no interest in partnering with Osama bin Laden.

=== Trial ===
Aziz was set to appear before the Iraqi High Tribunal set up by the Interim Government, but was not brought up on any charges until April 2008. This changed when, on 29 April 2008, Aziz went on trial over the deaths of a group of 42 merchants who were executed in 1992, after the merchants had been charged by the Iraqi regime with manipulating food prices when Iraq was under international sanctions. The charges brought against Aziz were reported by The Independent to be "surprising", for the deaths of the 42 merchants had always previously been attributed to Saddam Hussein. Nevertheless, on 11 March 2009 the Iraqi High Tribunal ruled that Aziz was guilty of crimes against humanity, and he was sentenced to 15 years in prison. On 2 August 2009, Aziz was convicted by the Iraqi High Tribunal of helping to plan the forced displacement of Kurds from northeastern Iraq and sentenced to seven years in jail. After these judgments had been passed, BBC News stated that "there was no evidence that a Western court would regard as compelling that he had anything like final responsibility for the carrying out of the executions" of the 42 merchants and "there was no real evidence of his personal involvement and guilt" with regards to the displacement of Kurds. That same year, he was acquitted in a separate trial which concerned the suppression of an uprising in Baghdad during the 1990s.

On 26 October 2010, the Iraqi High Tribunal handed down a death sentence against Aziz for the offense of "persecution of Islamic parties", amongst them the serving prime minister Nouri al-Maliki's Islamic Dawa Party, following a crackdown on a Shia uprising after the 1991 Gulf War. The Associated Press reported that "the judge gave no details of Aziz's specific role" in the crackdown. His lawyer stated that Aziz's role in the former Iraqi government was in the arena of "Iraq's diplomatic and political relations only, and had nothing to do with the executions and purges carried during Hussein's reign." His lawyer further stated that the death sentence itself was politically motivated and that timing of the death sentence may have been aimed at diverting international attention away from the Iraq War documents leak, which detailed crimes in which Maliki government officials have been implicated. His lawyers had 30 days to lodge an appeal, following which the court would have another 30 days to look into the appeal; if the appeal is turned down the sentence would be carried out after another 30 days.

On 26 October 2010, the Vatican urged the Iraqi government not to carry out his execution, and European Union foreign policy chief Catherine Ashton stated that Aziz's execution would be "unacceptable and the EU will seek to commute his sentence." That same day, the human rights organization Amnesty International issued a statement condemning the use of the death penalty in this case, as well as for the cases of two other former Iraqi officials; the statement also expressed concern regarding the manner in which trials may have been conducted by the Iraqi High Tribunal. On 27 October 2010, Greek President Karolos Papoulias and the Russian Foreign Ministry both released statements urging the Iraqi government not to carry out the death penalty against Aziz. Also on 27 October 2010, a spokesperson for United Nations Secretary-General Ban Ki-moon was reported to have "stressed that the UN is against the death sentence and in this case, as in all others, it is calling for the verdict to be cancelled."

On 28 October 2010, it was reported that some Iraqi Bishops and many ordinary Iraqis also condemned the death penalty for Aziz. Furthermore, according to The Wall Street Journal, "several international human-rights groups have criticised the procedures and questioned the impartiality of the court." According to Agence France-Presse (AFP), his family stated that Aziz, along with 25 fellow inmates, had been on a hunger strike following the sentence to protest the denial of their once-monthly visits with family and friends, but an Iraqi court official has denied this. According to AFP, Aziz and the other prisoners were "still at the site of the court in Baghdad’s Green Zone and had not been transferred back to prison where they could have received their monthly visit." On 17 November 2010, it was reported that Iraqi President Jalal Talabani had declared that he would not sign Aziz's execution order. On 5 December 2011, Saad Yousif al-Muttalibi, an adviser to the Prime Minister, had claimed the execution of Aziz would "definitely take place" after the withdrawal of American forces.

=== Illness and death ===
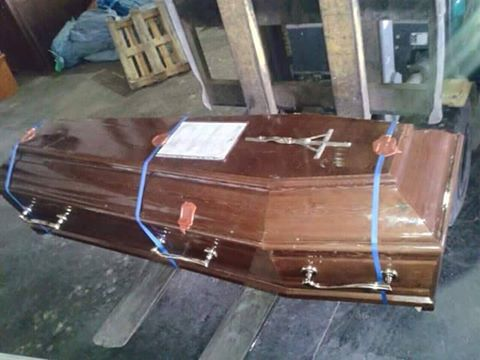
Funeral of Aziz, 2015

Aziz died on 5 June 2015 in al-Hussein hospital in the city of Nasiriyah, at the age of 79. According to his lawyer, he was being treated well in prison but suffered from ill health and simply wanted an end to his "misery". The incarcerated Aziz suffered from depression, diabetes, heart disease, and ulcers. Aziz's daughter, Zeinab, claimed his body was stolen at Baghdad International Airport en route to Jordan by unidentified men on 11 June, but it was recovered the next day. Jordanian authorities said the body had not been stolen, but merely delayed until the relevant paperwork was filled out. Aziz is buried in Madaba.

== Family ==
He had four children. Aziz resigned from his post over a corruption scandal involving his son Ziad Aziz, but Saddam did not accept his resignation. Ziad was eventually released from prison by Saddam.

Ziad Aziz now lives in Jordan with his wife, four children. Tariq Aziz's wife and another son live in Jordan.

== See also ==
- Saddam Hussein
- Izzat Ibrahim al-Douri
- Taha Yassin Ramadan
- Muhammad Saeed al-Sahhaf

Political offices
Preceded by Nasser al-Hani	Foreign Minister of Iraq; 1983–1991	Succeeded by Muhammad Saeed al-Sahhaf
