= Adel al-Zubeidi =

Adel al-Zubeidi عادل الزبيدي
- Died: 8 November 2005; Baghdad
- Occupation: Lawyer
- Known for: Defence lawyer for Taha Yassin Ramadan

Adel al-Zubeidi was a defense attorney during the Hussein Trials on the legal team representing Taha Yassin Ramadan.

He was killed on November 8, 2005, by three gunmen driving in either an Opel or a "government vehicle" outside Adil, a Sunni neighbourhood of Baghdad. He was traveling with Thamer Hamoud al-Khuzaie, another lawyer associated with the trials who was wounded in the attack. A day earlier, al-Zubeidi had predicted he would be murdered.

He was the second of Saddam's attorneys to be killed by unidentified forces, his death coming less than three weeks after Saadoun Sughaiyer al-Janabi was also killed.

== See also ==
- Saadoun Sughaiyer al-Janabi, a defense attorney for Awad Hamed al-Bandar, murdered in 2005
- Khamis al-Obeidi, a defense attorney for Saddam Hussein, murdered in 2006
