= Dujail massacre =

1982 mass killing in Dujail, Iraq

- Part of sectarian violence in Iraq
- Location of Dujail within Iraq
- Location: 33°50′20″N 44°14′53″E; Dujail, Saladin Governorate, Iraq
- Date: 8 July 1982; 44 years ago
- Target: Islamic Dawa Party
- Attack type: Judicial reprisals
- Deaths: 142–148 Shia Muslims
- Perpetrator: Iraqi Ba'ath Party (on the orders of Saddam Hussein)
- Motive: Retaliation for an unsuccessful assassination attempt by the Shia Islamic Dawa Party against the then President of Iraq, Saddam Hussein

The Dujail massacre was the mass killing of Shia civilians by the Ba'athist Iraqi government between 8 July 1982 and 1985 in Dujail in Iraq. The mass killing was committed in retaliation for an assassination attempt by the Iranian-backed Islamic Dawa Party on the President of Iraq, Saddam Hussein. The town of Dujail had a large Shia population, with 75,000 residents at the time of the incident, and was a well-known stronghold of the Dawa Party. It is located approximately 53 km (33 mi) from the capital of Baghdad, in the Sunni-majority Saladin Governorate of Iraq.

Hundreds of men, women and children were detained after the failed assassination attempt and more than 140 were sentenced and executed for their alleged involvement in the plot, including four who were mistakenly killed. Hundreds more were deported and their houses, farms and properties demolished.

Following his capture and subsequent trial during the Iraq War, Saddam Hussein was hanged on 30 December 2006 for crimes against humanity in connection with his involvement in the Dujail massacre. Many others, including Saddam’s brother, were also sentenced and executed for many crimes against humanity.

== Background ==
The Shia-dominated town of Dujail was a stronghold of the Islamic Dawa Party, an Islamist organization involved in the Iranian-backed insurgency against Saddam Hussein's Ba'athist regime in Iraq during the Iran–Iraq War. Widely viewed in the West as a terrorist organization at the time, the Dawa Party was banned by the Iraqi regime in 1980 and its members sentenced to death in absentia by the Iraqi Revolutionary Command Council.

== Events ==
On 8 July 1982, Saddam Hussein visited Dujail to make a speech praising local conscripts who had served Iraq in the ongoing war against neighbouring Iran. Hussein visited several households, and after finishing his speech, he prepared for his return to the capital city of Baghdad. As his motorcade proceeded down the main road, up to a dozen gunmen used the cover of the date palm orchards that lined both sides of the road to open fire, killing two of his bodyguards before fleeing on foot. In the ensuing four-hour-long firefight, most of the attackers were killed and several were captured.

== Reprisals ==
Saddam Hussein personally interviewed two of the captured attackers before he ordered his special security and military forces to round up all suspected members of the Islamic Dawa Party who lived in Dujail, along with their families. He later ordered the razing of orchards on both sides of the road from Balad to Dujail to prevent a repeat of the ambush.

On 14 October 1982, the Iraqi Revolutionary Command Council ordered the retitling of the roadside farmland to the Ministry of Agriculture and the compensation of the owners for their loss.

By late December 1982, 393 men over the age of 19 as well as 394 women and children from Dujail and the nearby town of Balad had been arrested. Held in detention at the Abu Ghraib prison near Baghdad, 138 male adult detainees and ten juveniles were tried before the Revolutionary Court after they confessed to having taken part in the assassination attempt.

Over several months, the remaining prisoners were transferred to detention centers in the desert to the west. One of the prisons was Nugra Salman Prison. More than 40 of those detained died during interrogation or in detention. A resident of Dujail later testified at Saddam's 2005 trial that he had witnessed torture and murders during the reprisal, including the murders of seven of his ten brothers.

After nearly two years in detention, around 400 detainees, primarily family members of the 148 who had confessed to involvement, were sent into internal exile in a remote part of southern Iraq. The remaining detainees were released and sent back to Dujail.

== Trial and execution of suspects ==
Following the 1982 confessions of 148 of the accused, the judiciary investigated the evidence in support and in late May 1984, it accepted their pleas of guilty to treason for providing armed support for Iran during the war, allowing the Revolutionary Court to review the investigation records and confessions before it sentenced the suspects. On 14 June 1984, the court handed down the mandatory death sentence. On 23 July 1984, Saddam signed the court documents authorising the executions and ordered the razing of the homes, buildings, date palms and fruit orchards of the convicted.

On March 23, 1985, 96 of the 105 condemned still living were executed. Two of the condemned were accidentally released, and a third was mistakenly transferred to another prison and survived. The 96 executed included four members of the Abdel-Amir family who had previously been found not guilty and ordered released. They were instead mistakenly executed. An investigation recommended for a decree to be issued to declare the Abdel-Amirs "martyrs" and the return of the property confiscated from their relatives. It further recommended the prosecution of the officer responsible. Saddam gave his approval to the recommendation and issued the decree. The officer would be sentenced to three years of imprisonment.

Ten children aged between 11 and 17 were originally believed to have been among the 96 executed, but they had actually been transferred to a prison outside the city of Samawah. In 1989, the ten juveniles, all now adults, were secretly executed on the orders of the Mukhabarat.

== After the fall of Saddam ==
The executions in Dujail were the primary charges for which Saddam was sentenced to death, and subsequently executed on 30 December 2006. At 1 a.m., on 13 December 2006, Barzan Hassan, Saddam's half-brother and the former Iraqi intelligence chief, and Awad Bandar, the former head of Iraq's Revolutionary Court, were escorted from their cells and told by their American guards that they were to be executed at dawn with Saddam. Nine hours later they were returned to their cells, as Iraqi authorities had decided to execute Saddam alone. They were both later hanged on 15 January 2007 for "aiding and abetting" a crime against humanity for naming the suspected Dawa Party members to be arrested.

Barzan Hassan was decapitated when he was hanged because of the wrong measurements of the rope. On January 25, 2010, Saddam's first cousin, Ali Hassan al-Majid, was hanged. Later, Taha Yassin Ramadan, Saddam's former deputy and vice-president who, as national commander of the Popular Army, had command responsibility (originally sentenced to life in prison but later to death by hanging), was likewise charged with "aiding and abetting" for arresting Dawa members and razing the orchards. Ramadan was executed on March 20, 2007, the fourth and last man in the Dujail trial to be hanged for crimes against humanity.

The charges against Saddam included razing 250,000 acres (100,000 ha) of Dujail farmland. The source for the figure was an unsourced claim published in a 2005 article in The New York Times. The claimed area is larger than the total amount of farmland surrounding Dujail, and less than 2% of the city's population had land confiscated or razed. Earlier media reports ranged from "thousands" to a high of "tens of thousands" of acres, which included the land confiscated from those convicted but also the land cleared to remove places of cover along the road from Balad to Baghdad for which the owners were compensated. There is no record of how many acres were actually razed. Two of the four Ba'ath Party officials who were executed for the massacre lived in Dujail, and the roadside farmland razed included land that belonged to both.

== See also ==
- List of massacres in Iraq
