= Ammar al-Bakri =

Iraqi lawyer

Ammar al-Bakri is an Iraqi judge who was the administrator of the Iraqi Special Tribunal to rule over the trial of Saddam Hussein. Al-Bakri was approved by the Iraqi National Council on October 4, 2004.

Critics claimed that al-Bakri is too close to the former interim Prime Minister Iyad Allawi.
