= 2008 Dujail bombing =

- Location: Dujail, Iraq
- Date: 12 September 2008 (UTC+3)
- Target: Police station
- Attack type: suicide bombings
- Deaths: 31
- Injuries: 60
- Perpetrator: Islamic State of Iraq (US claim)

The 12 September 2008 Dujail bombing occurred around 18:00 pm local time (15:00 UTC), on 12 September 2008 in Dujail, Salah ad-Din Governorate, when a suicide bomber drove and detonated an explosive laden car into a police station killing 31 and injuring 60. A nearby medical clinic was also damaged. The attack occurred at around 6:20 pm local time. The attack was blamed on Islamic State of Iraq by US military, was the biggest attack in Iraq in months and came at a time when the violence had fallen to a 4-year low.

== See also ==
- List of terrorist incidents in 2008
