= Saadoun Antar al-Janabi =

Iraqi lawyer

Saadoun Antar al-Janabi سعدون عنتر الجنابي
- Died: 20 October 2005; Baghdad
- Occupation: Lawyer
- Known for: Chief defence lawyer for Awad Hamed al-Bandar

Saadoun Antar al-Janabi (died 20 October 2005) was an Iraqi defence attorney during the Saddam Hussein trials, and was one of two lawyers representing Awad Hamed al-Bandar. He was the head of defense team in the trial.

== Career ==
He published his master's thesis Provisions of exceptional circumstances in Iraqi legislation (Arabic: أحكام الظروف الأستثنائية في التشريع العراقي) in 1981, which is still cited in several law courses such as at Al-Mustansiriya University.

== Death ==
Ten masked gunmen wearing Iraqi Police uniforms abducted al-Janabi, who was reportedly cooperative, from his office in Baghdad on October 20, 2005, one day after the trial of Awad Hamed al-Bandar began. His body was recovered outside an Ur mosque the following day with two gunshots to the head. Dheyaa al-Saadi, a lawyer who the following year led the Iraqi Bar Association, criticised the assassination, stating "This will have grave repercussions. This will hinder lawyers from defending those held for political reasons." In the course of the trials for Saddam Hussein, Saadoun al-Janabi was the first of many people to be killed by the government forces.

== See also ==
- Adel al-Zubeidi, a defense attorney for Taha Yassin Ramadan, murdered in 2005
- Khamis al-Obeidi, a defense attorney for Saddam Hussein, murdered in 2006
