= Taher Tawfiq al-Ani =

Iraqi politician

Taher Tawfiq al-Ani (born 17 December 1941) was an Iraqi politician who served as the governor of Mosul and the head of the Northern Affairs Bureau during the al-Anfal campaign. Prior to that, he was the secretary of the Revolutionary Command Council in 1968 and later served as undersecretary in the Ministry of Works and Housing. He also served as the Minister of Industry and Minerals between 1979 and 1983. Following the 2003 Invasion of Iraq he was charged by the Iraqi Special Tribunal with crimes against humanity, which were alleged were committed against the Kurds during the al-Anfal campaign. On 24 June 2007, Tawfiq was acquitted of all charges due to a lack of evidence.
