= Abdullah Kadhem Ruaid =

Iraqi politician and war criminal

Abdullah Kadhem Ruaid (Arabic: عبد الله كاظم رويد;1 January 1925 — 2 January 2011) was a former Arab Socialist Ba'ath Party official in the Dujail region of Iraq. He was also the father of Mizher Abdullah Roweed Al-Musheikhi. He was arrested in 2005 by A/1-128 of the Wisconsin Army National Guard. Ruaid was convicted of involvement in the killings of 148 Shia Muslims during the Al-Dujail trial of Saddam Hussein, and sentenced to 15 years in prison for aiding and abetting crimes against humanity.

Ruaid died in prison at the age of 86 on January 2, 2011, ten years before the end of his sentence.
