= Ali Dayeh Ali =

Ali Dayeh Ali (1940–2015) served as an Arab Socialist Ba'ath Party official in Dujail in 1982, where he was accused of involvement in the executions of 148 Shia Muslims in the area. He was tried alongside Saddam Hussein and was sentenced to 15 years in prison for aiding and abetting crimes against humanity.

He died at the age of 75 in prison in 2015, 6 years before completing his sentence.
