= Ali Hassan al-Majid =

Iraqi military officer and politician (1941–2010)

- علي حسن المجيد التكريتي
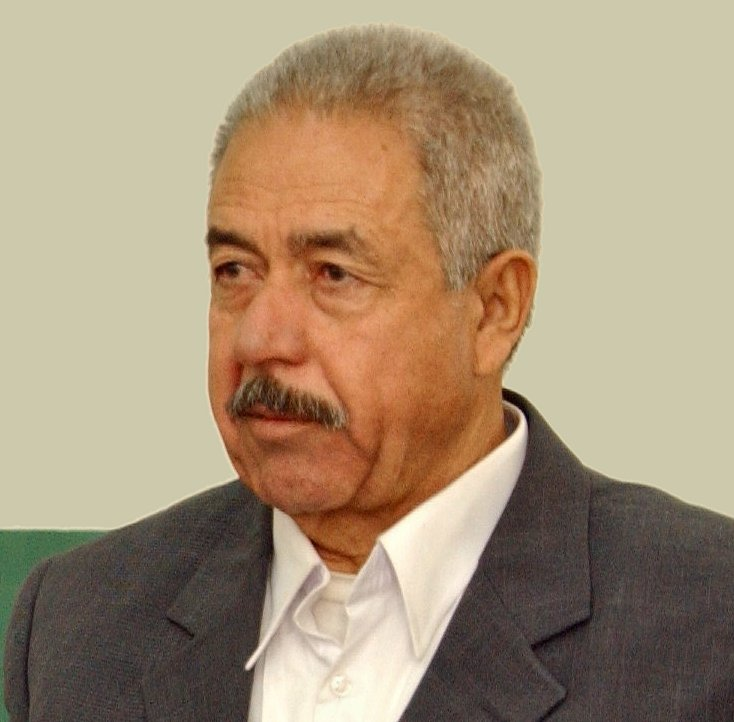
- Al-Majid at an investigative hearing in 2004

Director of the Directorate of General Security
- In office 1984–1987
- Preceded by: Fadhel Barak Hussein Al-Nasiri
- Succeeded by: Abdul Rahman al-Duri

Minister of Defense
- In office 1991–1995
- Preceded by: Saadi Toma Abbas
- Succeeded by: Sultan Hashim Ahmad al-Tai

Minister of Interior
- In office March 1991 – April 1991

Secretary of the Northern Bureau of the Iraqi Regional Branch
- In office March 1987 – April 1989

Member of the Regional Command of the Iraqi Regional Branch
- In office June 1982 – January 2010

Governor of Kuwait Governorate
- In office 1990–1991

Personal details
- Born: علي حسن المجيد التكريتي ʿʿAlī Ḥasan al-Majid al-Tikrītī c. 1941 (Note: al-Majid is thought to have been born in 1941, though he claimed in court that he was born three years later in 1944. The US, the United Nations and the Bank of England have also listed possible alternative birth years of 1943, 1939 & 1940. Official Iraqi court documents and the vast majority of journalistic obituaries cite 1941 as his approximate year of birth.) Tikrit, Iraq
- Died: 25 January 2010 (aged 68–69) Camp Justice, Baghdad, Iraq
- Cause of death: Execution by hanging
- Party: Iraqi Regional Branch of the Arab Socialist Ba'ath Party
- Relations: Saddam Hussein (cousin); Hussein (nephew); Saddam (nephew); Khairallah (brother-in-law)
- Parent: Hassan al-Majid
- Nickname: "Chemical Ali"

Military service
- Allegiance: (Iraq) Iraqi Republic (1959–1968); Ba'athist Iraq; (1968–2003)
- Branch/service: Iraqi Ground Forces
- Years of service: 1959–2003
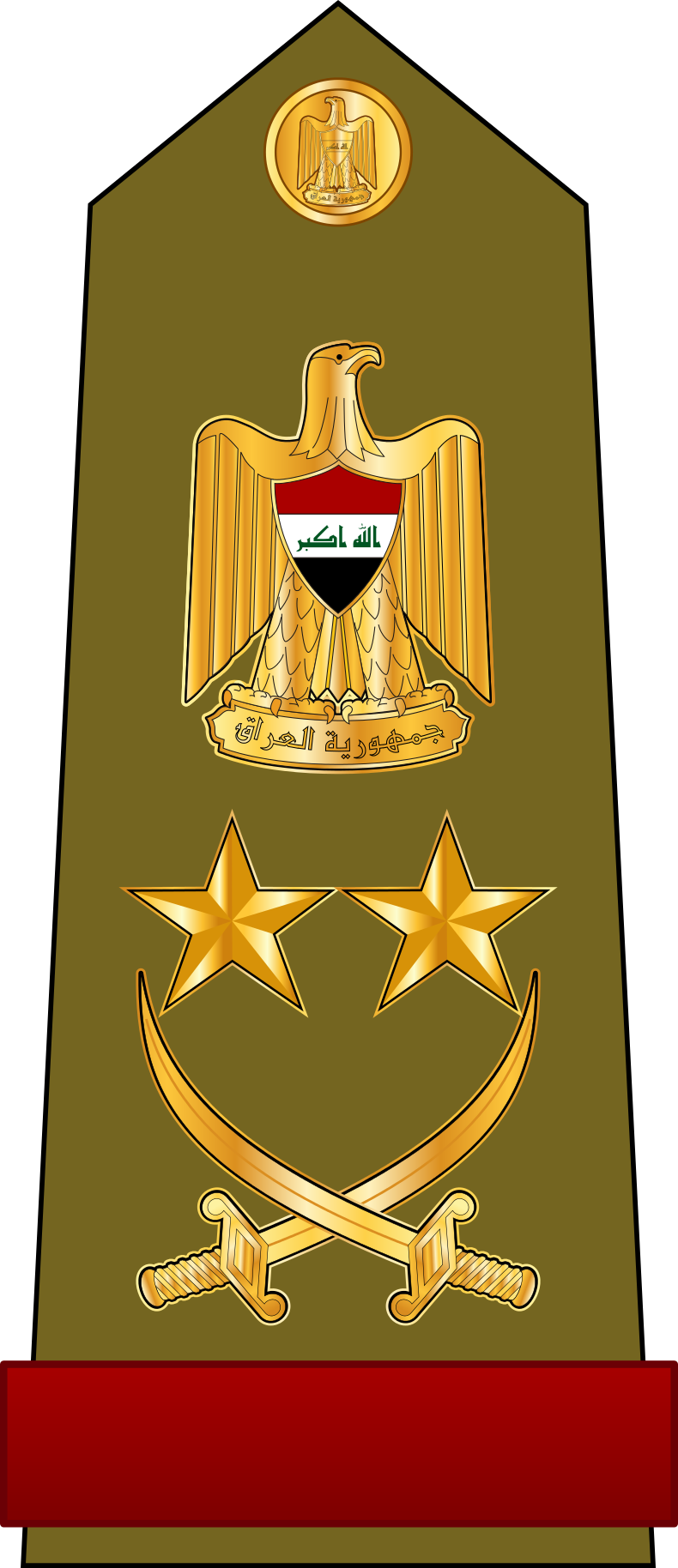
- Rank: Colonel General
- Commands: National Defense Battalions
- Battles/wars: First Iraqi–Kurdish War; Second Iraqi–Kurdish War; Iran–Iraq War; Anfal Campaign; Gulf War; Iraq War; Invasion of Iraq

Colonel General Ali Hassan al-Majid al-Tikriti (Arabic: علي حسن المجيد التكريتي, romanized: ʿAlī Ḥasan al-Majid al-Tikrītī; c. 1941 – 25 January 2010), was an Iraqi military officer and politician under Saddam Hussein who served as defense minister, interior minister, and chief of the General Security. He was also the governor of Kuwait during much of the Gulf War.

A first cousin of former Ba'athist Iraqi President Saddam Hussein, al-Majid became notorious in the 1980s and 1990s for his alleged role in the Iraqi government's campaigns against internal opposition forces, namely the Kurdish rebels of the north, and the Shia rebels of the south. Repressive measures included deportations and mass killings; al-Majid was dubbed "Chemical Ali" (علي الكيماوي, Ali Al-Kīmyāwī) by Iraqis for his use of chemical weapons in attacks against the Kurds.

Al-Majid was captured following the 2003 invasion of Iraq and was charged by the Iraqi government with war crimes, crimes against humanity and genocide. He was convicted in June 2007 and sentenced to death for crimes of genocide against the Kurds committed in the al-Anfal campaign of the 1980s. His appeal of the death sentence was rejected on 4 September 2007, and he was sentenced to death for the fourth time on 17 January 2010 and was hanged eight days later, on 25 January 2010.

== Early life ==
Al-Majid is thought to have been born around 1941 in al-Awja near Tikrit. He was a member of the Bejat clan of the Al-Bu Nasir tribe, to which his elder cousin Saddam Hussein also belonged. Saddam later relied heavily on the clan and tribe to fill senior posts in his government. Like Saddam, al-Majid also was a Sunni Muslim who came from a poor tribal family and had little formal education. He worked as a motorcycle messenger and driver in the Iraqi Army from 1959 until the Ba'ath Party seized power in 1968. Thereafter, he was able to gain entry into the Military Academy and was commissioned as an officer in the Infantry.

His rise, thereafter, aided by his cousin Saddam, was swift. He initially became an aide to Iraqi Defense minister Hammadi Shihab in the early 1970s after joining the Ba'ath party. He then became head of the government's Security Office, serving as an enforcer for the increasingly powerful Saddam. In 1979, Saddam seized power, ousting President Ahmed Hassan al-Bakr. At a videotaped assembly of Ba'ath party officials in July 1979, Saddam read out the names of political opponents, denouncing them as 'traitors', ordering that they be removed one by one from the room; many were later executed. Al-Majid could be seen in the background telling Saddam, "What you have done in the past was good. What you will do in the future is good. But there's this one small point. You have been too gentle, too merciful."

Al-Majid became one of Saddam's closest military advisors and head of the Iraqi Intelligence Service, Iraqi secret police known as the Mukhabarat. Following an unsuccessful assassination attempt on Saddam in 1982 in the town of Dujail, north of Baghdad, al-Majid directed the subsequent collective punishment operations in which scores of local men were killed, thousands more inhabitants were deported, and the entire town was razed to the ground.

== Al-Anfal campaign ==
During the late stages of the Iran–Iraq War al-Majid was given the post of Secretary General of the Northern Bureau of the Ba'ath Party, in which capacity he served from March 1987 to April 1989. This effectively made him Saddam's proconsul in the north of the country, commanding all state agencies in the rebellious Kurdish-populated region of the country. He was known for his ruthlessness, ordering the indiscriminate use of chemical weapons such as mustard gas and the extremely potent and toxic nerve agents sarin, tabun, and VX, against Kurdish targets during a genocidal campaign dubbed Al-Anfal ("Spoils of War"). The first such attacks occurred as early as April 1987 and continued into 1988, culminating in the notorious attack on Halabja in which over 5,000 people were killed.

With Kurdish resistance continuing, al-Majid decided to cripple the rebellion by eradicating the civilian population of the Kurdish regions. His forces embarked on a systematic campaign of mass killings, property destruction and forced population transfer (called "Arabization") in which thousands of Kurdish and Assyrian villages were razed and their inhabitants either killed or deported to the south of Iraq. He signed a decree in June 1987 stating that "Within their jurisdiction, the armed forces must kill any human being or animal present in these areas." By 1988, some 4,000 villages had been destroyed, an estimated 180,000 Kurds had been killed and some 1.5 million had been deported. The Kurds called him Chemical Ali ("Ali Al-Kīmāwī") for his role in the campaign; according to Iraqi Kurdish sources, Ali Hassan openly boasted of this nickname. Others dubbed him the "Butcher of Kurdistan".

== Gulf War and Iraq War ==
Al-Majid was appointed Minister of Local Government following the war's end in 1988, with responsibility for the repopulation of the Kurdish and Assyrian region with Arab settlers relocated from elsewhere in Iraq. Two years later, after the invasion of Kuwait in August 1990, he became the military governor of the occupied emirate. He instituted a violent regime under which Kuwait was systematically looted and purged of "disloyal elements". In November 1990, he was recalled to Baghdad and was appointed Interior Minister in March 1991. Following the Iraqi defeat in the war, he was given the task of quelling the uprisings in the Shi'ite south of Iraq as well as the Kurdish and Assyrian north. Both revolts were crushed with great brutality, with many thousands killed.

Al-Majid was subsequently given the post of Defense Minister, though he briefly fell from grace in 1995 when Saddam dismissed him after it was discovered that al-Majid was involved in illegally smuggling grain to Iran. In December 1998, however, Saddam recalled him and appointed him commander of the southern region of Iraq, where the United States was increasingly carrying out air strikes in the northern no-fly zone. Al-Majid was re-appointed to this post in March 2003, immediately before the start of the Iraq War. He based himself in the southern port city of Basra and in April 2003 he was mistakenly reported to have been killed there in a U.S. air strike.

Al-Majid survived the April 2003 attack but was arrested by American forces on 17 August 2003 in Basra. He had been listed as the fifth most-wanted man in Iraq, shown as the King of Spades in the deck of most-wanted Iraqi playing cards. In 2006, he was charged with genocide and crimes against humanity for his part in the Anfal campaign and was transferred to the Iraq Special Tribunal for trial. He received four death sentences for his role in killing Shia Muslims in 1991 and 1999, the genocide of the Kurds in the 1980s, and ordering the gassing of Kurds at Halabja.

== Trial and execution ==
The trial began on 21 August 2006, in acrimonious circumstances when al-Majid refused to enter a plea. He subsequently had a not guilty plea entered on his behalf by the court.

He was unapologetic about his actions, telling the court that he had ordered the destruction of Kurdish villages because they were "full of Iranian agents". At one hearing, he declared: "I am the one who gave orders to the army to demolish villages and relocate the villagers. The army was responsible to carry out those orders. I am not defending myself. I am not apologizing. I did not make a mistake."

During the trial, the court heard tape-recorded conversations between al-Majid and senior Ba'ath party officials regarding the use of chemical weapons. Responding to a question about the success of the deportation campaign, Ali Hassan told his interlocutors:

I went to Sulaymaniyah and hit them with the special ammunition [i.e. chemical weapons]. That was my answer. We continued the deportations. I told the mustashars [village heads] that they might say that they like their villages and that they won't leave. I said I cannot let your village stay because I will attack it with chemical weapons. Then you and your family will die. You must leave right now. Because I cannot tell you the same day that I am going to attack with chemical weapons. I will kill them all with chemical weapons! Who is going to say anything? The international community? Fuck them! The international community and those who listen to them. ... This is my intention, and I want you to take serious note of it. As soon as we complete the deportations, we will start attacking them everywhere according to a systematic military plan. Even their strongholds. In our attacks we will take back one third or one half of what is under their control. If we can try to take two-thirds, then we will surround them in a small pocket and attack them with chemical weapons. I will not attack them with chemicals just one day, but I will continue to attack them with chemicals for fifteen days. Then I will announce that anyone who wishes to surrender with his gun will be allowed to do so. Anyone willing to come back is welcome, and those who do not return will be attacked again with new, destructive chemicals. I will not mention the name of the chemical because that is classified information. But I will say with new destructive weapons that will destroy you. So I will threaten them and motivate them to surrender.

During the next few days of the trial, more recordings of al-Majid were heard in which he once again discussed the government's goals in dealing with the Iraqi Kurds. In the recordings, Ali Hassan calls the Iraqi Kurdish leader Jalal Talabani "wicked and a pimp," and promises not to leave alive anyone who speaks the Kurdish language.

Ali Hassan's defense claimed that he used such language as "psychological and propaganda" tools against the Kurds, to prevent them from fighting government forces. "All the words used by me, such as 'deport them' or 'wipe them out,' were only for psychological effect," Ali Hassan said.

On 24 June 2007, the court returned a verdict of guilty on all counts. The presiding judge, Mohammed Oreibi al-Khalifa, told al-Majid: "You had all the civil and military authority for northern Iraq. You gave orders to the troops to kill Kurdish and Assyrian civilians and put them in severe conditions. You subjected them to wide and systematic attacks using chemical weapons and artillery. You led the killing of villagers. You ... committed genocide. There are enough documents against you."

He received five death sentences for genocide, crimes against humanity (specifically willful killing, forced disappearances and extermination), and war crimes (intentionally directing attacks against a civilian population). He was also sentenced to multiple prison terms ranging from seven years to life for other crimes. As his sentences were upheld, under Iraqi law, sentence was to be carried out by hanging, subject to the convictions being upheld following an automatic appeal, and he was to be executed in the following 30 days along with two others – Sultan Hashim Ahmed al-Tai, military commander of the Anfal campaign; and Hussein Rashid, deputy general commander of the Iraqi armed force, assistant chief of staff for military operations, and former Republican Guard commander. However, the executions were postponed to 16 October, because of the arrival of the holy month of Ramadan. He was supposed to be executed 16 October 2007, but the execution was delayed when Iraqi President Jalal Talabani and Vice President Tariq al-Hashemi expressed opposition to the sentences of al-Majid's co-defendants and refused to sign the execution orders. He then entered into a legal row with Iraqi Prime Minister Nouri al-Maliki, and as a result the Americans refused to hand any of the condemned prisoners over until the issue was resolved.

In February 2008 an anonymous informant stated that Ali Hassan al-Majid's execution was finally approved by Talabani, al-Hashemi, and al-Maliki; this was the final hurdle in the way of the execution. On 2 December 2008, al-Majid was once again sentenced to death, but this time for playing a role in killing between 20,000 and 100,000 Shi'ite Muslims during the revolt in southern Iraq that followed the 1991 Gulf War.

On 2 March 2009, al-Majid was sentenced to death for the third time, this for the assassination of Grand-Ayatollah Mohammad al-Sadr in 1999.

The Iraqi Cabinet put pressure on the Presidential council on 17 March 2009 for Al-Majid's execution.

The situation was similar on 17 January 2010 prior to 9 am (GMT); a fourth death penalty was issued against him in response to his acts of genocide against Kurds in the 1980s. He was also convicted of killing Shia Muslims in 1991 and 1999. Alongside him in the trial was former defense minister Sultan Hashem, who was also found guilty by the Iraqi High Tribunal for the Halabja attack and sentenced to 15 years' imprisonment. Al-Majid was executed by hanging on 25 January 2010. He was buried in Saddam's family cemetery in al-Awja the next day; near Saddam's sons, half-brother and the former vice president, but outside the mosque housing the tomb of Saddam. While he was sentenced to death on four occasions, the original 2007 verdict sentenced him to five death sentences, and so the combined tally of death sentences handed out was eight.

Amnesty International's Middle East and North Africa Director Malcolm Smart later criticized the execution as "only the latest of a mounting number of executions, some of whom did not receive fair trials, in gross violation of human rights..."
