= Mizhar Abdullah Ruaid =

Iraqi politician, criminal (born 1952)

Mizhar Abdullah Ruaid (born 1952) is a former Arab Socialist Ba'ath Party official in the Dujail region of Iraq, and the son of Abdullah Kadhem Ruaid. He was arrested in 2005 by US Forces while still living in Dujail. The arresting unit was the A/1-128 Infantry of the Wisconsin Army National Guard. He was convicted of involvement in the killings of 148 Shia Muslims during the Al-Dujail trial of Saddam Hussein, and was sentenced to 15 years in prison for aiding and abetting crimes against humanity. Ruaid has since completed his sentence.
