= Camp Justice (Iraq) =

Joint Iraqi-American military base

Coordinates: 33.382°N 44.353°E

- معسكر العدالة
- Kadhimiya, Baghdad, in Iraq
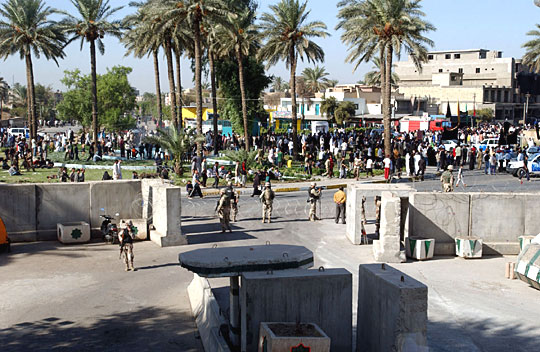
- Pilgrims march outside Camp Justice in 2004.

Site information
- Type: Military base
- Operator: United States Army, Iraqi military
- Controlled by: United States Army, Iraqi military
- Open to the public: No
- Condition: Active

Location
- Location of Camp Justice in Kadhimiya, Baghdad

Site history
- Built: 2004
- In use: 2004 – present
- Events: 2006 Execution of Saddam Hussein, 2007 Executions of Barzan Ibrahim al-Tikriti, Awad Hamed al-Bandar, Taha Yassin Ramadan, and 2010 Hanging of Ali Hassan al-Majid (Chemical Ali)

Garrison information
- Garrison: United States Army, Iraqi military
- Formerly known as "Camp Banzai" until mid-September 2004.

Camp Justice (also known as Camp Al-Adala; Arabic: معسكر العدالة) was a joint Iraqi-U.S. military base in the Kadhimiya district of Baghdad, Iraq used during Operation Enduring Freedom.

== Etymology ==
The location was referred to as the Old Iraqi Defense Intelligence Agency compound, then in 2003 as Camp Hunte after Spc. Simeon Hunte before it became Camp Banzai. It was renamed from "Camp Banzai" in mid-September 2004 as part of an effort to give Army facilities around Baghdad friendlier names. In 2011, it was the Joint Security Station (JSS) Justice before being handed back over to the Government of Iraq.

== History ==
Camp Justice was originally the site of Saddam Hussein's 5th Department and was used for Iraqi intelligence operations.

On 20 March 2003, the U.S. led the invasions of Iraq and in March Baghdad fell. In April 2003, the Coalition Provisional Authority (CPA) officials established the Central Criminal Court of Iraq (CCCI) to prosecute serious offences with proceedings hosted at Camp Justice.

The base was the location of the 2006 execution of Saddam Hussein; the 2007 hanging of Barzan Ibrahim al-Tikriti, Awad Hamed al-Bandar, and Taha Yassin Ramadan; and the 2010 hanging of Saddam's cousin Ali Hassan al-Majid, a.k.a. Chemical Ali.

Saddam Hussein, the former president of Iraq, was executed at approximately 05:50 +03:00 UTC on 30 December 2006. Two weeks later on January 15, 2007, Barzan Ibrahim al-Tikriti, former head of the Iraqi Intelligence Service, and Awad Hamed al-Bandar, former head of the Iraqi Revolutionary Court, were also executed by hanging at this site.

Saddam's former deputy and former vice-president, Taha Yassin Ramadan (who was originally sentenced to life in prison on November 5, 2006, but had it changed to a death sentence three months later), was likewise hanged here on March 20, 2007, two months and five days after Barzan's and al-Bandar's execution. Likewise Saddam's cousin Ali Hassan al-Majid (Chemical Ali) was hanged on January 25, 2010 (three years after his cousin's execution), after receiving four death sentences.

== Correctional facilities ==
Women on Iraq's death row are held at the Shaaba Khamsa death row facility at Camp Justice. As of 2014 the adult women's death row had 36 women as well as children even though the facility was only intended to hold 25 women.
