= Awad Hamed al-Bandar =

Iraqi chief judge during the presidency of Saddam Hussein

- عواد حمد بندر السعدون

Head of the Revolutionary Court for Dujail

Personal details
- Born: عواد حمد بندر السعدون; 2 January 1945 Basra, Kingdom of Iraq
- Died: 15 January 2007 (aged 62) Camp Justice, Kadhimiya, Baghdad, Iraq
- Cause of death: Execution by hanging
- Occupation: Judge

Awad Hamad al-Bandar (Arabic: عواد حمد البندر السعدون, romanized: ʿAwād Ḥamad al-Bandar al-Saʿdūn; (2 January 1945 – 15 January 2007) was an Iraqi chief judge under Saddam Hussein's presidency. He was a member of the Arab Socialist Ba'ath Party and was the head of the Revolutionary Court which issued death sentences against 143 Dujail residents, in the aftermath of the failed assassination attempt on the president on 8 July 1982.

== Arrest and trial ==
After the US invasion, he was formally handed over to the interim Iraqi Government in 2004. On 31 July 2005, at the Al-Dujail trial, the Iraqi Special Tribunal tried al-Bandar for crimes against humanity for issuing the death sentences where he pleaded not guilty. On 5 November 2006, al-Bandar was sentenced to death by hanging along with co-defendants Hussein and Barzan Ibrahim al-Tikriti. His body was buried next to Saddam Hussein's in Al-Awja.

Al-Bandar's defence counsel consisted of Bader Awad Hamed Alsa'doon as lead defense and Saadoun Antar al-Janabi (also: Sa'doon al-Janabi). The latter was assassinated on 20 October 2005, one day after being abducted from his home in Baghdad.

== Execution ==
The sentence was widely expected to be carried out on 30 December 2006, shortly before 6:00 AM Iraqi local time. Saddam Hussein was hanged at 6:05 AM Iraqi local time (0305 UTC). Initially, al-Tikriti and al-Bandar were also believed to have been hanged with him. A few hours later, official statements clarified that the executions of al-Bandar and his remaining co-defendant had been postponed to give special significance to the day that Hussein was executed. The United States claimed that it did not have helicopters available to fly the remaining two to the place of execution; the Iraqi government later said that they did not have time.

On 3 January 2007, an Iraqi government official told the Associated Press that preparations were under way to hang Saddam's half-brother al-Tikriti, a former intelligence chief, and al-Bandar, the former chief justice of the Revolutionary Court on Thursday 4 January 2007. Both were hanged before dawn on 15 January 2007. They were pronounced dead at 3:05 AM (0005 UTC). Al-Bandar's legal counsel was not allowed to attend. Hussein and his half-brother al-Tikriti were also not allowed to have their lawyer present when they were executed.
