= Dujail =

Dujail الدجيل
- Town
- Location of Dujail in Iraq
- Coordinates: 33°50′20″N 44°14′53″E
- Country: Iraq
- Governorates of Iraq: Saladin
- District: Dujail

Population (2015)
  - Total: 100,000

Dujail (Arabic: الدجيل; alternate spelling: Ad Dujayl) is a town in Saladin Governorate, Iraq. It is about 65 kilometers (40 mi) north of Baghdad. It was the site of the 1982 Dujail Massacre, in which between 142 and 148 people, including children, died. The 2008 Dujail bombing also took place there.

Dujail is mostly populated by the Al-Khazraji tribe.
