= 2002 in aviation =

This is a list of aviation-related events from 2002.

== Events ==
- A depression in North American commercial aviation begins in the aftermath of an economic recession and the 11 September attacks of 2001.
- The Government of Hungary creates the Civil Aviation Safety Bureau of Hungary as the agency responsible for the investigation of aviation accidents in Hungary.
- Air Djibouti ceases operations.

=== January ===
- During January, the Indonesian airline Metro Batavia makes its first flights, operating between Jakarta and Pontianak, Indonesia. The airline later will be renamed Batavia Air.
- 1 January – Norway's Accident Investigation Board for Civil Aviation – the future Accident Investigation Board Norway – takes on the responsibility for the investigation of railway accidents in Norway and is renamed the Accident Investigation Board for Civil Aviation and Railways.
- 5 January – A Cessna 172 Skyhawk piloted by high-school student Charles J. Bishop crashes into the side of the Bank of America Plaza in downtown Tampa, Florida, killing the teenager and damaging an office.
- 16 January – Both engines of a Boeing 737-3Q8 operating as Garuda Indonesia Flight 421 with 60 people on board flame out while the aircraft is flying through a thunderstorm with heavy rain and hail during an Indonesian domestic flight from Ampenan on Lombok to Yogyakarta on Java. Unable to restart the engines, the pilots attempt to ditch the aircraft in the Bengawan Solo River on Java. A flight attendant is killed after it strikes a rock; she is the only fatality.
- 27 January – A Russian Interior Ministry Mil Mi-8 (NATO reporting name "Hip") helicopter is shot down and explodes near Shelkovskaya in Nadterechny District, Chechnya, killing all 14 people on board. The deputy interior minister, a lieutenant general, a major general, and three colonels are among the dead.
- 28 January – When the pilots of TAME Flight 120, a Boeing 727-134 registered as HC-BLF and named El Oro, fly an incorrect route in foggy conditions on final approach to Teniente Coronel Luis a Mantilla International Airport in Tulcán, Ecuador, the aircraft flies into the side of the Cumbal Volcano near Ipiales, Colombia, killing all 94 people on board.

=== February ===
- 12 February – Iran Air Tours Flight 956, a Tupolev Tu-154M (NATO reporting name "Careless"), crashes in Iran 370 kilometres (200 nmi; 230 mi) southwest of Tehran, killing all 119 people on board.

=== March ===
- The Indonesian airline Awair suspends operations. It will not resume flights until December 2004, when it begins flying as an associate of AirAsia.
- 4 March – Ansett Australia permanently ceases flight operations for the second and final time due to financial collapse. Its final flight lands the following morning.
- 31 March – Bankrupt Swissair goes out of business. On the same day, the Swiss airline Crossair ceases operations as such and reconstitutes itself as Swiss International Air Lines, which immediately takes over many of Swissair's routes.

=== April ===
- 1 April – Swissair's last flight, Flight 145, arrives in Zürich, Switzerland, from São Paulo, Brazil. The 71-year history of Swissair, during which it has carried more than 260 million passengers, comes to an end.
- 15 April – Air China Flight 129, a Boeing 767, crashes on a mountainside near Busan killing 128 of the 166 people on board.
- 18 April – A Rockwell Commander 112 crashes into the upper floors of the Pirelli Tower in Milan, Italy, killing its pilot and four people in the building. Sixty more people in the building and on the ground sustain injuries.

=== May ===
- 3 May – After the pilot of an Indian Air Force MiG-21bis (NATO reporting name "Fishbed") fighter hears an explosion in the aircraft's engine and ejects, the MiG-21 crashes into a bank in Jalandhar, Punjab, India, setting the bank and an adjacent lumber store on fire, showering nearby homes with debris, killing eight people on the ground, and injuring 17 others. The pilot survives.
- 4 May – EAS Airlines Flight 4226 a BAC One-Eleven, crashes shortly after takeoff in Kano, Nigeria, killing 73 of the 77 people on board and 30 people on the ground.
- 7 May
  - EgyptAir Flight 843, a Boeing 737-566, crashes near Tunis, Tunisia, killing 14 of the 62 people on board.
  - China Northern Airlines Flight 6136, a McDonnell Douglas MD-82, crashes near Dalian, China, killing all 112 people on board after a passenger deliberately set the plane on fire.
- 20 May – The Republic of China removes the Aviation Safety Council – the government agency responsible for aviation accident investigation, with the purpose of analyzing causal factors and proposing flight safety recommendations in Taiwan – from the control of the Executive Yuan and makes it an independent government agency, as it had been from May 1998 to May 2001.
- 25 May – China Airlines Flight 611, a Boeing 747-200B, breaks apart in flight and crashes into the Taiwan Strait, killing all 225 passengers and crew. An investigation blames the accident on metal fatigue caused by inadequate maintenance 22 years earlier.

=== June ===
- 12 June – Returning to the frigate HMS Richmond after an exercise, the British Royal Navy Westland Lynx helicopter XZ256 suffers a double engine failure and crashes into the Atlantic Ocean, killing two of the three people on board. The helicopter's observer, Jenny Lewis, is believed to be the first female Royal Navy aviator to die in service.
- 14 June – Estonian Aviation Museum was opened to the general public.
- 17 June – A C-130A Hercules airtanker engaged in aerial firefighting near Walker in Mono County, California, crashes after both of its wings fold upward and separate from the aircraft. The entire crew of three is killed.

=== July ===
- 1 July – Bashkirian Airlines Flight 2937, a Tupolev Tu-154 (NATO reporting name "Careless"), collides with DHL Flight 611, a Boeing 757 cargo aircraft, over the towns of Überlingen and Owingen in southern Germany, killing all 69 people on the Tu-154 and both people on the DHL 757. Forty-five of the dead aboard the Tu-154 are Russian schoolchildren from the city of Ufa in Bashkortostan on a school trip to the Costa Daurada area of Spain organized by the local United Nations Educational, Scientific, and Cultural Organization (UNESCO) committee.
- 2 July – Steve Fossett becomes the first person to fly solo around the world non-stop in a balloon.
- 4 July
  - An Egyptian-American man, Hesham Mohamed Hadayet, opens fire on the El Al ticket counter at Los Angeles International Airport in Los Angeles, California, killing two Israelis and wounding four other people before an El Al security guard shoots him to death.
  - A Prestige Airlines Boeing 707-123B crashes on final approach to Bangui Airport in Brazzaville, Central African Republic, killing 28 of the people on board. There are only two survivors, both of whom are injured.
- 7–14 July – The 15th FAI World Precision Flying Championship takes place in Zagreb, Croatia. The individual winners are 1. Lubos Hajek (Czech Republic, in a Cessna 152), 2. Janusz Darocha (Poland, in a Cessna 152), 3. Predrag Crnko (Croatia, in a Cessna 150). Team winners are 1. the Czech Republic, 2. Poland, 3. Croatia.
- 10 July – Unable to land at Hamburg Airport in Hamburg, Germany, Swiss International Air Lines Flight 850, a Saab 2000, diverts to Tegel Airport in Berlin and then to Eberswalde Airfield in Eberswalde, but weather prevents those landings as well. Finally, the aircraft diverts to Werneuchen Airfield at Werneuchen, where it strikes an earth bank that stretches across a closed portion of the runway. The impact rips off its landing gear, and it slides to a halt on its belly on the runway, damaged beyond repair. One passenger suffers injuries.
- 15 July – The European Union's European Aviation Safety Agency is established. It will begin operations in September 2003.
- 16 July – The Sikorsky S-76A helicopter G-BJVX, operated by Bristow Helicopters, crashes in the southern North Sea during a flight between the gas production platform Clipper and the drilling rig Global Santa Fe Monarch, killing all 11 people on board.
- 17 July – Midway Airlines suspends operations.
- 18 July – A Consolidated P4Y-2 Privateer airtanker engaged in aerial firefighting near Estes Park, Colorado, crashes after its left wing folds upward and separates from the aircraft. Its crew of two is killed.
- 27 July – During an air show at Sknyliv Airfield in Lviv, Ukraine, the two-man crew of a Sukhoi Su-27 (NATO reporting name "Flanker") fighter of the Ukrainian Air Force demonstration team, the Ukrainian Falcons, ejects after the Su-27's left wing strikes the ground. The Su-27 then strikes a parked Ilyushin Il-76 (NATO reporting name "Candid") and cartwheels into a crowd of spectators, killing 58 adults and 19 children and injuring over 500 people.
- 29 July
  - Vanguard Airlines ceases operations. The next day it files for reorganization under Chapter 11 of United States bankruptcy law.
- July–December – Italian conservationist and pilot Angelo d'Arrigo guides a flock of 10 endangered Western Siberian cranes bred in captivity with a foot-launched powered hang glider 5,500 km (miles) from the Arctic Circle in Siberia across Kazakhstan to the shores of the Caspian Sea in Iran, avoiding Afghanistan and Pakistan, where he feared the birds would fall victim to the abundant guns there.

=== August ===
- 8 August – Attempting to land at Rio Branco International Airport in Rio Branco, Brazil, during a rainstorm, Rico Linhas Aéreas Flight 4823, an Embraer EMB 120 Brasilia, crashes short of the runway, killing 23 of the 31 people on board and injuring all eight survivors.
- 10 August – US Airways files for Chapter 11 bankruptcy.
- 12 August – The Republic of Korea abolishes the Investigation Division of the Ministry of Construction and Transportation's Civil Aviation Bureau and creates the Korea Aviation Accident Investigation Board, which replaces he Investigation Division as the government agency responsible for aviation accident investigations in South Korea.
- 13 August – Midway Airlines files for Chapter 11 bankruptcy.
- 15 August – Wanted for hijacking Delta Air Lines Flight 334 – a Boeing 727 with 88 people on board flying from New Orleans, Louisiana, to Atlanta, Georgia – to Havana, Cuba, in September 1980, Miguel Aguiar Rodriguez finally is arrested for the hijacking by U.S. authorities when he arrives for an appointment with the U.S. Immigration and Naturalization Service in Miami, Florida, seeking legal residency. He had returned to the United States illegally in 2000.
- 19 August – Chechnen separatists shoot down an overloaded Russian Federation Air Force Mil Mi-26 (NATO reporting name "Halo") helicopter carrying at least 140 Russian military personnel with a 9K38 Igla (USDoD designation "SA-18", NATO reporting name "Grouse") shoulder-fired surface-to-air missile at Khankala, Chechnya. The helicopter crashes in a minefield, killing 127 of those on board. It is the largest loss of life in a single incident in the history of helicopter aviation. For the Russian armed forces, it is the greatest loss of life in a single military aviation incident, and the greatest loss of life in any single incident since 1999.
- 26 August – An unmanned National Aeronautics and Space Administration scientific balloon sets a world altitude record for balloons, reaching 161,000 feet (49,000 meters). At 60,000,000 cubic feet (169,9011 cubic meters), it also is the largest balloon ever launched successfully.

=== September ===
- 5 September – As part of Operation Southern Focus, 100 American aircraft attack the main air defense site in western Iraq.
- 14 September – Total Linhas Aéreas Flight 5561, an ATR 42-312, crashed killing the two pilots on board.

=== October ===
- 9 October – Northwest Airlines Flight 85, a Boeing 747-451 bound from Detroit Metropolitan Wayne County Airport in Detroit, Michigan, to New Tokyo International Airport in Narita, Japan, with 404 people on board, experiences a rudder hardover event while cruising off Alaska at 35,000 feet (11,000 meters). The flight crew regains control of the aircraft and makes an emergency landing at Ted Stevens Anchorage International Airport in Anchorage, Alaska, without injury to anyone on board. The National Transportation Safety Board finds that the problem occurred because of a fatigue crack in a power control module.
- 18 October – Boeing reveals its Bird of Prey stealth technology demonstrator, which has conducted a number of flights during the period 1996 to 1999.
- 24 October – The Government of Kenya establishes the Kenya Civil Aviation Authority as Kenya's national civil aviation authority.

=== November ===
- The United States Navy's new F/A-18E Super Hornet fighter-bomber sees combat for the first time, when F/A-18Es of Strike Fighter Squadron 115 (VFA-115) flying from the aircraft carrier USS Abraham Lincoln (CVN-72) strike surface-to-air missile sites and command-and-control targets near Al Kut, Iraq, during Operation Southern Focus.
- 3 November – An American Central Intelligence Agency MQ-1 Predator unmanned aerial vehicle hits a vehicle in Yemen with an AGM-114 Hellfire missile, killing five al-Qaeda members in the vehicle, including Qaed Salim Sinan al-Harethi and Kamal Derwish.
- 6 November
  - Luxair Flight 9642, a Fokker 50 with 22 people on board, crashes in Luxembourg while on final approach to Luxembourg Findel Airport outside the city of Luxembourg after its flight crew accidentally selects reverse pitch for its propellers. Twenty of those on board die, including Luxembourgish artist Michel Majerus.
  - National Airlines, already operating under Chapter 11 bankruptcy, permanently ceases operations.
- 11 November – Laoag International Airlines Flight 585, a Fokker F-27 Friendship with 34 people on board, crashes into Manila Bay just after takeoff from Ninoy Aquino International Airport in Manila, the Philippines. Nineteen people die, and all 15 survivors are injured.
- 18 November – American Airlines and British Airways announce plans to codeshare some transatlantic flights, but the partnership is heavily restricted by U.S. regulators.
- 27 November - A British Airways Concorde from LHR to JFK loses part of its rudder but it is able to make a safe landing at JFK.
- 28 November – In Mombasa, Kenya, terrorists attack the Israeli-owned Paradise Hotel, killing 13 people and injuring 80 others with an exploding all-terrain vehicle, and almost simultaneously fire two shoulder-launched Strela 2 (NATO reporting name "SA-7 Grail") surface-to-air missiles at a chartered Boeing 757 airliner belonging to Israel-based Arkia Airlines as it takes off from Moi International Airport. Both missiles miss, and the airliner arrives safely five hours later at Ben Gurion Airport in Tel Aviv under the escort of Israeli Air Force F-15 Eagle fighters. Overnight, four Israeli C-130 Hercules transport aircraft evacuate the dead and injured from Mombasa. All commercial flights from Israel to Kenya are suspended indefinitely.

=== December ===
- Air Ukraine declares bankruptcy.
- 9 December – United Airlines files for Chapter 11 reorganization, the largest airline bankruptcy in US history.
- 21 December – TransAsia Airways Flight 791, an ATR 72-202 registered as B-22708, crashed due to icing killing both pilots on board.
- 23 December
  - An unmanned aircraft is involved in air-to-air combat for the first time when two Iraqi MiG-23s (NATO reporting name "Flogger") attack a U.S. Air Force RQ-1 Predator unmanned aerial vehicle experimentally armed with AIM-92 Stinger air-to-air missiles and patrolling the no-fly zone over southern Iraq in an attempt to bait Iraqi Air Force fighters into combat during Operation Southern Watch. After neither MiG-23 achieves a lock-on, an Iraqi MiG-25 (NATO reporting name "Foxbat") of the 1st Fighter-Interceptor Squadron scrambles to assist. The MiG-25 and Predator fire missiles at one other; the MiG-25 is out of range of the Predator's Stingers, but it shoots down the Predator.
  - An Antonov An-140 operated by Aeromist-Kharkiv crashes near Ardestan, Iran, while on descent to Isfahan International Airport at Isfahan, Iran, killing all 44 people on board.

== First flights ==
Section Source:

=== January ===
- 15 January – Millennium Jet SoloTrek XFV
- 15 January – Airbus A318
- 23 January – IITB PADD Micro airship

=== February ===
- 11 February – Airbus A340-500
- 16 February – WD D5 Evolution
- 19 February – Embraer 170
- 27 February – Cessna 680 Citation Sovereign
- February ?? – Socata TBM 700C2

=== March ===
- 4 March – Van's RV-9
- 7 March – Aviat Husky Pup
- 28 March – AATG AT-10 airship

=== April ===
- 4 April – Sikorsky MH-60R Seahawk
- 21 April – Irkut A-002
- 26 April – Extra 500
- 29 April – Saab AB JAS 39C Gripen

=== May ===
- 18 May – Tomair Cobra Arrow
- 22 May – Zlin Z 400 Rhino
- 22 May – Boeing X-45
- 29 May – Aceair Aeriks A-200
- 31 May – Toyota TAA-1

=== June ===
- 1 June – Aero L159B
- 22 June – Tupolev Tu-214VSSN
- 28 June – CAC J-10
- 30 June – 21st Century Airships SPAS-R1

=== July ===
- 1 July – Pilatus PC-21
- 9 July – CargoLifter Scala
- 11 July – Adam A500
- 18 July – Boeing YAL-1
- 31 July – Boeing 747-400ER

=== August ===
- 1 August – Scaled Composites White Knight
- 5 August – BAE Systems Hawk NDA
- 20 August – KAI T-50 Golden Eagle
- 26 August – Eclipse Aviation Eclipse 500
- 31 August – Learjet 40

=== September ===
- 18 September – GE90-115B, world's most powerful jet engine
- 20 September – BAE Systems Harrier GR Mk 7A

=== November ===
- 9 November – MVEN MVEN-1 Fermer
- 30 November – Sauper Aviation Papango

=== December ===
- 4 December – Vulcanair Mission – I-VAVF
- 9 December – Diamond Twin Star
- 12 December – Grob G 140TP

== Entered service ==
- Airbus A340-600 with Virgin Atlantic

=== March ===
- 18 March – HAL Dhruv with the Indian Coast Guard

=== September ===
- 27 September – * Sukhoi Su-30MKI (NATO reporting name "Flanker-H") with the Indian Air Force

== Deadliest crash ==
The deadliest crash of this year was China Airlines Flight 611, a Boeing 747 which broke up in flight and crashed into the Taiwan Strait on 25 May, killing all 225 people on board.
