= Iraqi Armed Forces =

Military of Iraq

- القوات المسلحة العراقية (Arabic) هێزە چەکدارەکانی عێراق (Kurdish)
- Emblem of the Ministry of Defense of Iraq
- Founded: 6 January 1921; 105 years ago
- Current form: 18 August 2003; 23 years ago
- Service branches: Iraqi Ground Forces; Iraqi Air Force; Iraqi Navy; Iraqi Air Defence Command; Counter Terrorism Command; Popular Mobilization Forces (Note: De facto independent and largely under the control of Iran and the Axis of Resistance. almost all PMF factions take orders from and pledge allegiance to Mojtaba Khamenei, the supreme leader of Iran.)
- Headquarters: Republican Palace, Baghdad
- Website: www.mod.mil.iq

Leadership
- Commander-in-Chief (Note: ”The Prime Minister is the direct executive authority responsible for the general policy of the State and the commander-in-chief of the armed forces”. (Article 78, Iraqi Constitution). The President performs “the duty of the High Command of the armed forces for ceremonial and honorary purposes”, such as "to award medals and decorations on the recommendation of the Prime Minister". (Article 73, IX, V, Iraqi Constitution)): Ali al-Zaidi
- Minister of Defence: Nayif al-Shammari
- Chief of the General Staff: General Abdul Amir Yarallah

Personnel
- Military age: 18
- Conscription: No
- Active personnel: 193,000 (2024)

Expenditure
- Budget: $10.3 billion (2023)

Industry
- Foreign suppliers: Brazil; China; Pakistan; Russia; Republic of Korea; Iran; Serbia; Germany; NATO; European Union; France; Turkey; United Kingdom; United States
- Annual imports: $2.4 billion (2015-2023)
- Annual exports: $1.8 billion (2015-2023)

Related articles
- History: Military history of Iraq: List of wars involving Iraq
- Ranks: Military ranks of Iraq

The Iraqi Armed Forces (Note: Arabic: القوات المسلحة العراقية, romanized: Al-Quwwat Al-Musallahah Al-Iraqiyyah; Kurdish: هێزە چەکدارەکانی عێراق) are the military forces of the Republic of Iraq. They consist of the Ground Forces, the Air Force, the Navy and the Air Defence Command. The armed forces are administered by the Ministry of Defence (MoD). Effective control of the armed forces rests with the prime minister of Iraq. Along with the primary service branches, there exists two non-MoD agencies that are part of the armed forces and report directly to the prime minister; namely, the Counter Terrorism Service and the Popular Mobilization Forces.

The armed forces of Iraq were initially formed in the early 1920s. Six military coup d'états were mounted by the army between 1936 and 1941. They first saw combat in the Anglo-Iraqi War of 1941. They fought against Israel in the 1948 Arab–Israeli War, in the 1967 Six-Day War, and in the 1973 Yom Kippur War. Two wars against the Kurds were fought during 1961-1970 and 1974–1975. A much larger conflict was the Iran–Iraq War, initiated by the Iraqis in 1980, which continued until 1988. Thereafter Iraq began the invasion of Kuwait, which led to the Gulf War of 1991, which led in turn to confrontations over the Iraqi no-fly zones during the 1990s, and finally the Iraq War of 2003, which resulted in the dissolution of the Iraqi armed forces imposed by the Coalition Provisional Authority.

The nascent post-Iraq war Iraqi armed forces were engaged in anti-insurgency during the insurgency and civil war that followed the US-led invasion of the country. The latest major conflict in which the armed forces of the country participated was the war against ISIS during 2013 until 2017. Logistics and combat engineering have been traditional strong points. Iraqi soldiers have also usually fought hard in difficult situations.

After the 2003 U.S. invasion of Iraq, which resulted in the toppling of Saddam Hussein and the subsequent dissolution of the whole armed forces, the United States sought to rebuild them anew, and so the country received substantial assistance from the United States Department of Defense. Since the implementation of the U.S.-Iraq Status of Forces Agreement on January 1, 2009, the Iraqi Armed Forces and the forces of the Iraqi interior ministry are responsible for providing security and upholding law and order throughout most of Iraq.

The Iraqi armed forces were historically one of the more competent militaries in the Arab world. However, during Saddam Hussein's dictatorship and interference in military organization, the competence of the Army severely declined. The Army, in particular, is one of the most trusted national institutions of Iraq. Iraqi Armed Forces deficiencies have been identified in enabling functions, such as, logistics and military intelligence. In high-end conventional operations, Iraqi capabilities are currently limited by lack of artillery and air power.

== Role ==
=== Legal standing ===
Article 9 of the Constitution of Iraq establishes the legal basis of the Iraqi Armed Forces, itself being drawn upon Article 27 of the 2004 Transitional Administrative Law.

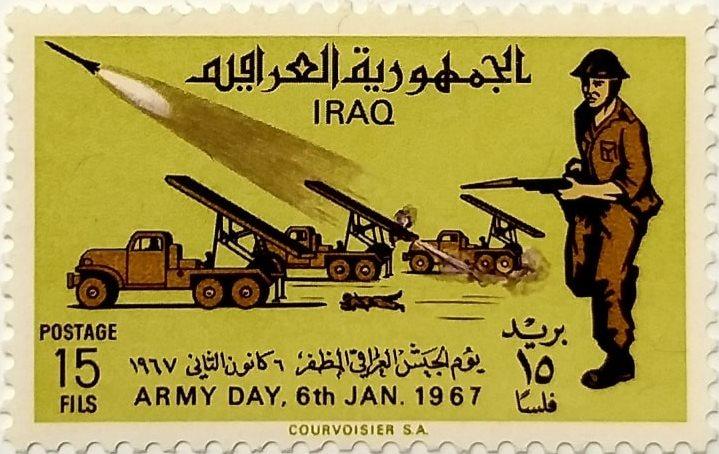
An Iraqi postage stamp of 15 fils, issued in 1967, on the occasion of the Iraqi Army Day, January 6.

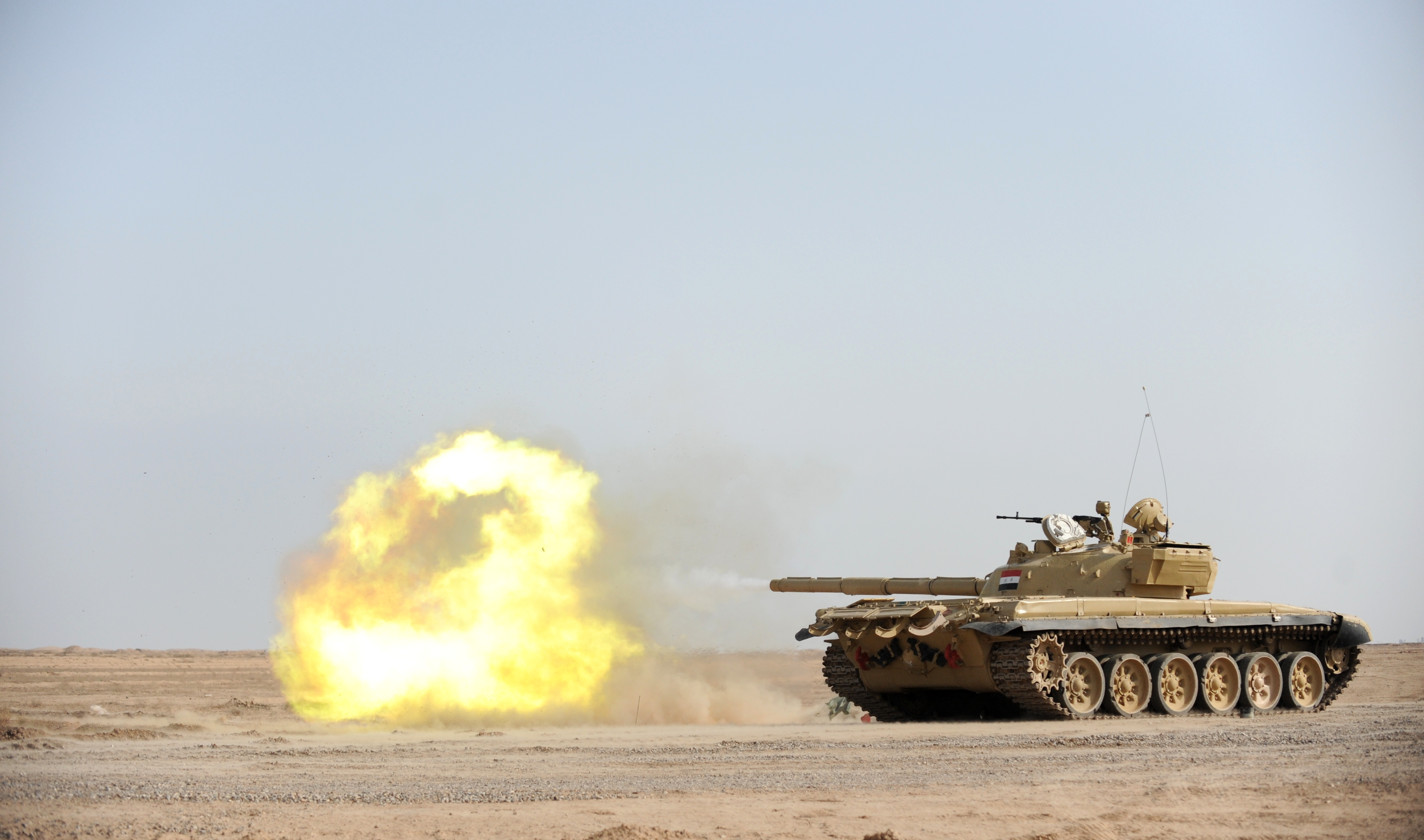
An Iraqi T-72 tank firing, presumably during military training

Part A, First Section, Article 9 states that 'The Iraqi armed forces and security services will be composed of the components of the Iraqi people with due consideration given to their balance and representation without discrimination or exclusion. They shall be subject to the control of the civilian authority, shall defend Iraq, shall not be used as an instrument to oppress the Iraqi people, shall not interfere in political affairs, and shall have no role in the transfer of authority.' Parts B and C prohibit the formation of military militias outside the framework of the armed forces and prohibit armed forces personnel from standing for political office or campaigning for political candidates. Part C expressively notes that military personnel are allowed to vote in elections. Part E expressively states the Iraqi Government's commitment to the respect and implementation of Iraq's international obligations regarding the non-proliferation, non-development, nonproduction, and non-use of nuclear, chemical, and biological weapons. The Second Section says that military service shall be regulated by law.

The prime minister acts as the commander-in-chief (Article 78 of the constitution), and the president’s role is strictly ceremonial and honorary, such as awarding medals and decorations on the recommendation of the commander-in-chief (Article 73). The appointment of the chief of staff is approved by the Council of Representatives of Iraq after being appointed by the Council of Ministers which is headed by the commander-in-chief, an ex officio position held by the prime minister of Iraq.

Iraq's legislation on defence dates from the Coalition Provisional Authority period of 2003–2004. CPA Order 22 established the New Iraqi Army on August 18, 2003, and CPA Order 67 renamed the New Iraqi Army the Iraqi Armed Forces on March 21, 2004. In the process, the New Iraqi Army was expanded to include an Army, Air Force, Coastal Defense Force, reserve forces, and other elements.

Iraq does not appear to have publicly issued a national defence review or white paper. Much of defence policy since 2003 has been set by the United States. For example, one mission objective for Multi-National Force-Iraq was an "Iraq that has a security force that can maintain domestic order and deny Iraq as a safe haven for terrorists". To do this, the U.S. aimed to train and equip Iraq's security forces and gradually transition security responsibilities to them. In 2010 there are at least three major defence tasks. They are the suppression of the insurgency, the resolution of the Kurdish Peshmerga forces' status in relation to the Iraqi Armed Forces themselves, and longer-term, the growth of the armed forces so that they can defend Iraq from external threats.

== History ==
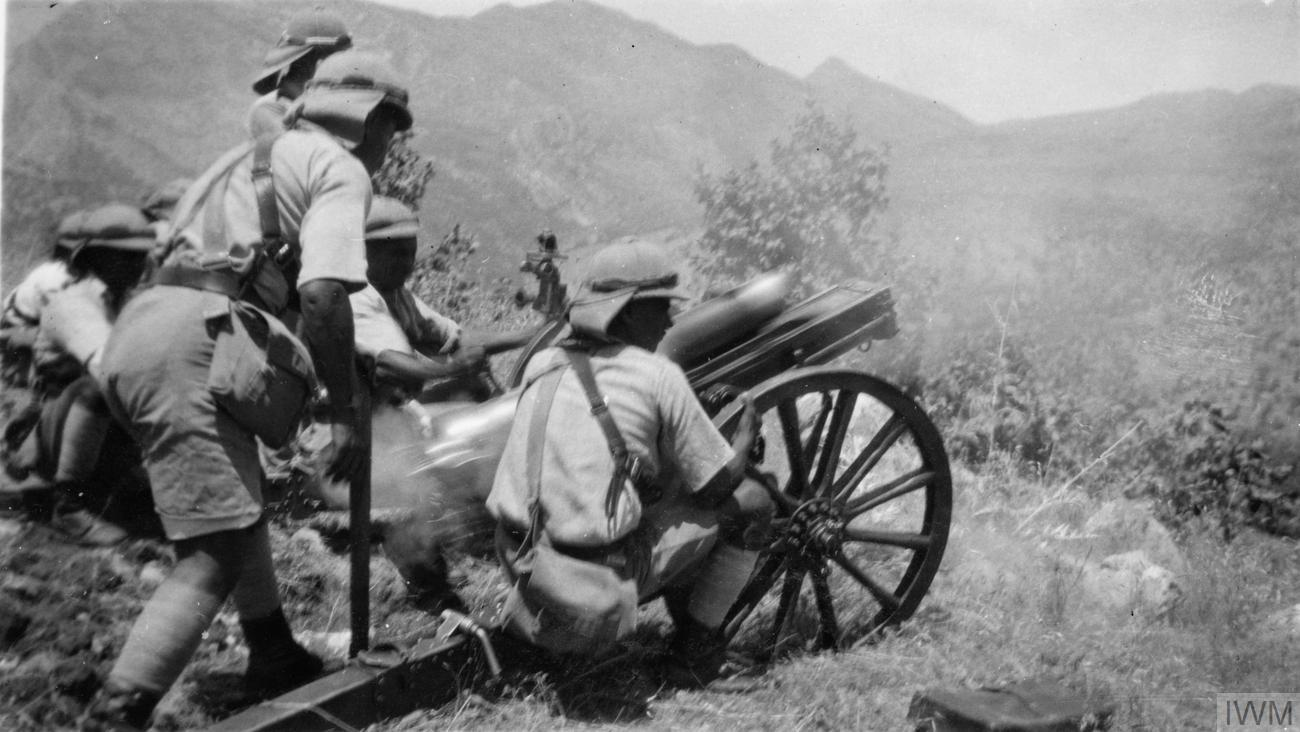
Iraqi Army mountain gun in action during the anti-Barzani operations against a revolt in northern Iraq, June 1932.

The armed forces of Iraq began to be formed by the United Kingdom after they assumed mandated control over Iraq after 1917. During the March 1921 Cairo conference, it was agreed that an Iraqi Army would be created along British lines, with British training and equipment. King Faisal wanted an army of 15,000–20,000 men. The army actually grew from 3,500 in 1922 to 7,000 in 1927 and then to 11,500 in 1932. The army became a modernising influence in the country. In 1931, the Iraqi Air Force was founded with a small number of pilots. Six Army coups took place, with one in 1936 being led by Bakr Sidqi and the last being the Rashid Ali coup of 1941. Following the persecution of the Assyrians, which culminated in the Simele massacre of 1932, a conscription law was introduced, which strengthened the Iraqi Army at the expense of the tribal sheiks. In 1938–1939, Iraqi Army forces were concentrated near the Kuwaiti border, as the military portion of a policy by then-King Ghazni to encourage its union with Iraq. British forces later defeated the Iraqis in the short Anglo-Iraqi War of May 1941, during the Second World War. The Iraqi Air Force used British aircraft until the 14 July Revolution in 1958, where the new Iraqi government began increased diplomatic relationships with the Soviet Union. The Iraqi Air Force used both Soviet and British aircraft throughout the 1950s and 1960s. In 1961, Iraqi forces were again amassed along the Kuwaiti border, and Iraqi again threatened to invade. A quick British deployment of troops, aircraft, and naval vessels, called Operation Vantage, deterred any move though. Iraqi forces fought in the 1948 Arab–Israeli War, a first war against the Kurds from 1961 to 1970, and then in the Six-Day War of 1967.

Iraqi participation in the Six-Day War was limited, principally owing to the slow reaction of the Iraqi 3rd Armoured Division, which had been stationed in eastern Jordan. The 3rd Armoured Division did not organise itself and reach the front line before the Jordanians ceased operations. Therefore, Iraqi participation was limited to a Tu-16 bomber raid on Israel, which did not locate its targets, and a return Israeli air raid on the H-3 airbase, which was around 435 kilometers from Bagdad in western Iraq, near the H-3 oil pumping station. The Israelis reportedly destroyed 21 Iraqi aircraft for the loss of three of their own.

After the first Kurdish war ended with a stalemate, the Armed Forces began to implement a number of changes. They concluded that Soviet equipment and methods did not meet their needs and that many western weapons were superior to their Soviet counterparts. Also the Soviet Union was trying to influence Iraqi policy by holding up arms deliveries. Despite the large amount of Soviet equipment that Iraq continued to receive (shown by the SIPRI Arms Transfers Database, Iraq 1973–1990), Iraq sought Western military equipment. Purchases from France included 64 Mirage F1 fighter-attack aircraft in 1976 and 200 AMX-30 tanks in 1977. That same year, Iraq ordered ten frigates and corvettes from Italy and in 1978 it purchased 200 Cascavel APCs from Brazil. While Iraqi generals supported a complete changeover to Western equipment, Western countries were reluctant to sell large amounts of weaponry to Iraq. Western weapons were more expensive than Soviet ones, and they took longer to train personnel on, so there was a reluctance to make a complete equipment reversal. However, more weapons were bought from various non-communist countries, supplementing their largely Soviet arsenal, and a reliance on Soviet doctrine reduced. In most cases, the Iraqis went back to British doctrine, while in others, they melded British and Soviet doctrine. Iraq's logistics capability was also improved, with the purchase of 2,000 heavy equipment transporters.

Iraqi participation in the Yom Kippur War of 1973 took the part of a 60,000 strong Iraqi Army expeditionary force which operated on the Syrian front. However, the force did not perform very well, and the Iraqi Air Force did not do well either, losing 26 of the 101 fighter aircraft sent to Syria without shooting down any Israeli aircraft.

The Kurds started the second Kurdish war of 1974–75, but the war ended in a Kurdish defeat after the Iranian–Iraqi Algiers agreement cut off Iranian support to the Kurds. From 1973 to 1980, Saddam largely relieved the armed forces of internal security functions by creating new paramilitary forces, such as the Iraqi Popular Army. He also guaranteed the military's loyalty to the regime by promoting loyal officers and purging questionable ones. However, this had the effect of filling the senior officer ranks with incompetents.

=== Iran–Iraq War (1980–1988) ===
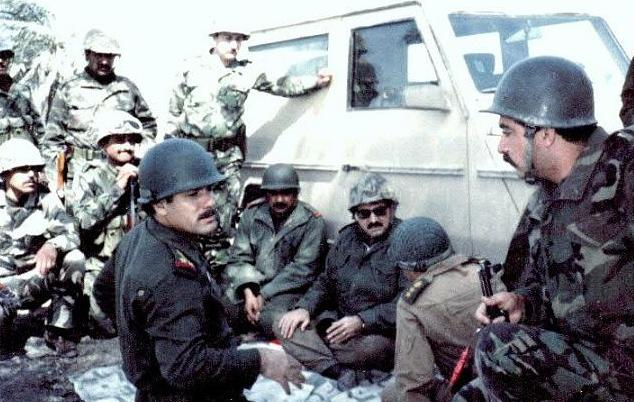
Iraqi commanders discussing strategy on the battlefront (1986)

The Iran–Iraq War (Note: Persian: جنگ ایران و عراق; Arabic: حرب الخليج الأولى, الحرب الإيرانية العراقية The war is known in the Arab world and other countries as the First Gulf War) was a protracted armed conflict that began on 22 September 1980 when Iraq invaded neighbouring Iran. The war lasted almost eight years, ending in a stalemate on 20 August 1988 when Iran accepted a UN-brokered ceasefire. Iraq's rationale for the invasion was primarily to cripple Iran and prevent Ayatollah Ruhollah Khomeini from exporting the 1979 Iranian Revolution movement to Shia-majority Iraq and threaten the Sunni-dominated Ba'athist leadership. Iraq had also wished to replace Iran as the dominant state in the Persian Gulf, which was before this point not seen as feasible by the Iraqi leadership due to pre-revolutionary Iran's colossal economic and military might, as well as its close alliances with the United States and Israel. The war followed a long-running history of border disputes, as a result of which Iraq had planned to annex Iran's oil-rich Khuzestan Province and the east bank of the Shatt al-Arab (also known in Iran as the Arvand Rud).

Although Iraq hoped to take advantage of Iran's post-revolutionary chaos and expected a decisive victory in the face of a severely weakened Iran, Iraq only made progress for three months. By December 1980 the invasion had stalled. In fierce fighting, the Armed Forces of the Islamic Republic of Iran started to gain momentum and regained virtually all lost territory by June 1982, pushing the Iraqis back to the pre-war border lines. Following this, the next five years saw Iran go on the offensive until Iraq took back the initiative in mid-1988, and whose major offensives led to the final conclusion of the war. There were a number of proxy forces operating for both countries. Also the United States, United Kingdom, Soviet Union, France, and most Arab countries provided an abundance of financial, political and logistical support for Iraq.

=== Gulf War (1990–1991) ===
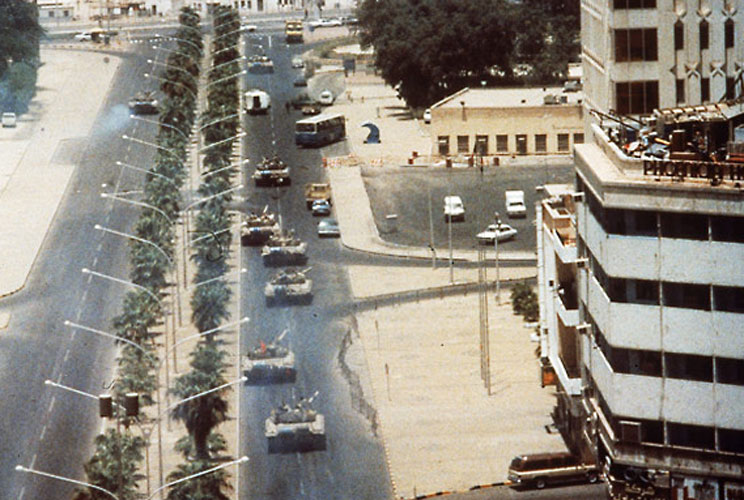
Iraqi tanks in Kuwait City of Iraqi-occupied Kuwait on 2 August 1990 during the Iraqi invasion of Kuwait that began the Gulf War.

Saddam Hussein had also poured massive resources into regime protection agencies, like the Republican Guard, that later took on a battlefield role. Losses during the Persian Gulf War from the United States-led coalition resulted in the reduction of Iraq's ground forces to 23 divisions and the air force to less than 300 aircraft. The Iraqi Popular Army was also disbanded. Military and economic sanctions prevented Iraq from rebuilding its military power. What rebuilding was done was concentrated on the Republican Guard and the new Special Republican Guard, created after the war ended. Iraq maintained standing armed forces about 375,000 strong. Armed force intelligence was provided by the Directorate of General Military Intelligence.

Under Saddam Hussein, Iraq had a growing domestic arms producing industry that produced everything from rifle bullets to ballistic missiles, advanced naval mines, the Lion of Babylon (tank), remote-piloted "drone" aircraft, sophisticated cluster-bomb, infrared and television-guided bombs and laser-guided missiles. At that time, Iraq was believed to be way ahead of its then rival Iran's arms producing industry.

The Iraqi Armed Forces were involved in suppressing the 1991 uprisings in Iraq, which led to refugees fleeing north in 1991. The U.S. launched Operation Provide Comfort with allied aid to provide assistance to these refugees. This involved some confrontations with the Iraqi armed forces. The Iraqi no-fly zones were established partially due to these operations. Operation Southern Watch dominated Iraqi airspace in the southern part of Iraq while Operation Northern Watch did the same in the north. As a result of Iraqi actions, cruise missile strikes on Iraq were launched in June 1993. The same year, the Iraqi Air Defence Command was elevated and established as a fourth service. Kuwait was then threatened with Republican Guard divisions in October 1994, which resulted in a major U.S. protective deployment designated Operation Vigilant Warrior. Operation Vigilant Sentinel was a later 1995–2007 operation of the same nature. More cruise missile strikes on Iraq were launched in 1996. Iraq was bombed again in Operation Desert Fox in 1998. As U.S. preparations for an attack on Iraq gathered pace in 2002, Operation Southern Focus was launched, further damaging Iraqi air defences in the southern part of the country.

=== Iraq War (2003–2011) ===
In the 1980s and 1990s, Iraq built and used an arsenal of chemical and biological weapons, some of which have been alleged to come from the United States and its allies. These weapons were ordered destroyed by United Nations Security Council Resolutions. After a protracted and problematic weapons inspection process, the majority of these types of weapons were considered to be destroyed and their facilities sealed under UN weapons inspections. A new round of weapons inspections was performed in early 2003 by United Nations weapons inspectors led by Hans Blix, which searched Iraqi sites again, but found no new weapons or weapons programs. However, the Bush Administration decided that Saddam Hussein's regime must be removed, and it gave an ultimatum to that effect.

On March 19, 2003, the United States, with British, Australian, and Polish assistance began the 2003 invasion of Iraq. In the process, Saddam's armed forces were defeated. In the south, the U.S. Combined Forces Land Component Command drove north with the Army's V Corps, and I Marine Expeditionary Force (which included a British Army division). They defeated the 3rd Corps, the Republican Guard, and much of the Fedayeen Saddam. In the north, the special operations-led Task Force Viking, defeated the 1st Corps and Iraqi 5th Corps plus parts of the Republican Guard. Significant battles included the Battle of Nasiriyah and the Battle of Baghdad. The British Army controlled the southern regions of Iraq and fought there until their withdrawal on 30 April 2009. The United States controlled Northern and Central Iraq. After the invasion, the Coalition Provisional Authority was established to administer the occupation.

=== Rebuilding the Armed Forces ===
The Armed Forces were formally disbanded and the Iraqi Ministry of Defense was dissolved shortly after the invasion, by Coalition Provisional Authority Order Number 2 of May 23, 2003.

On June 25, 2003, the Vinnell Corporation was awarded a contract to train the first nine battalions, or 9,000 recruits, of a 44,000 person-strong "New Iraqi Army." MPRI was given the military training subcontract. The Department of Defense created the Coalition Military Assistance Training Team under Major General Paul Eaton to oversee the process. On August 2, 2003, the first battalion of new Iraqi Army (IA) recruits started a nine-week training course at a training base in Qaraqosh. They graduated on October 4, 2003.

In the interim, the new army had been formally established by Coalition Provisional Authority Order 22 of August 18, 2003. Then on September 3, 2003, Coalition Provisional Authority Order Number 28 established the Iraqi Civil Defense Corps as a temporary security agency to complement Coalition military operations in Iraq.

In April 2004, an Iraqi battalion refused to fight insurgents in Fallujah. Soon afterwards, U.S. forces in Iraq were reorganised. Multi-National Force-Iraq (MNF-I) was created under General George W. Casey, Jr. For the new Iraqi armed forces, the most important move was the creation of Multi-National Security Transition Command - Iraq (MNSTC-I) as a subordinate command to MNF-I, under Major General David Petraeus. MNSTC-I was given the task of building up the new Iraqi Armed Forces, as well as the Ministry of Interior (Iraq) (MOI) and other security forces. A new force generation plan aimed to create ten army divisions.

On 22 April 2004, under Coalition Provisional Authority Order Number 73 all personnel, facilities, and equipment of the Iraqi Civil Defense Corps were transferred to the Iraqi Ministry of Defence as a component of the Iraqi Armed Forces.

After the dissolution of the Coalition Provisional Authority on June 28, 2004, the U.S. and its allies remained in Iraq, receiving authorisation to do so under United Nations Security Council Resolution 1546. For periods immediately after the invasion, U.S. Army forces had seen the fighting as conventional 'fighting in built up areas,' rather than as an insurgency. After a review of the Iraq War strategy in the end of 2004, General Casey directed the Coalition forces to shift their focus from fighting insurgents to training Iraqis. This was to be the strategy until 2006. The aim was a small Coalition footprint and a rapid handover of security responsibilities to new Iraqi forces. Developing indigenous military forces became a cornerstone of the 2006 United States counter-insurgency doctrine. However, after the national elections in December 2005, the Iraqi insurgency shifted focus from a resistance against the occupation towards a sectarian conflict. Accelerated by the Golden mosque bombing in February 2006, the levels of sectarian violence rose dramatically. In Baghdad, a cycle of sectarian violence accelerated in which Al-Qaeda-affiliated Sunni insurgents carried out suicide-bombings in Shia districts and Shia militias retaliated with killings in Sunni districts. It became evident that the Iraqi Armed Forces and the various MOI forces were incapable of putting a lid on the sectarian violence and protecting the population, and MNF-I had to adjust plans again. Though Iraqi forces had received initial training and been equipped, they had not developed the capabilities needed to plan, conduct and sustain effective counter-insurgency operations. There were also challenges at the ministerial level, within the Ministry of Defence and the Ministry of Interior, and these ministries could not sustain their forces in terms of logistics, intelligence, communications and procurement. The Iraq War troop surge of 2007 allowed Iraqi forces more time for training and leadership development, as well as more Coalition partnering with Iraqi units. The commander of the Iraqi Assistance Group, General Dana Pittard, said in June 2007 that Coalition forces should not draw down too quickly and that the transitioning of security responsibilities would take time.

In July 2006, a milestone was achieved when the first Iraqi province transferred to Provincial Iraqi Control. Al Muthanna Governorate was the first province to be transferred. Twelve further governorates were transferred to Provincial Iraqi Control from September 2006 to October 2008.

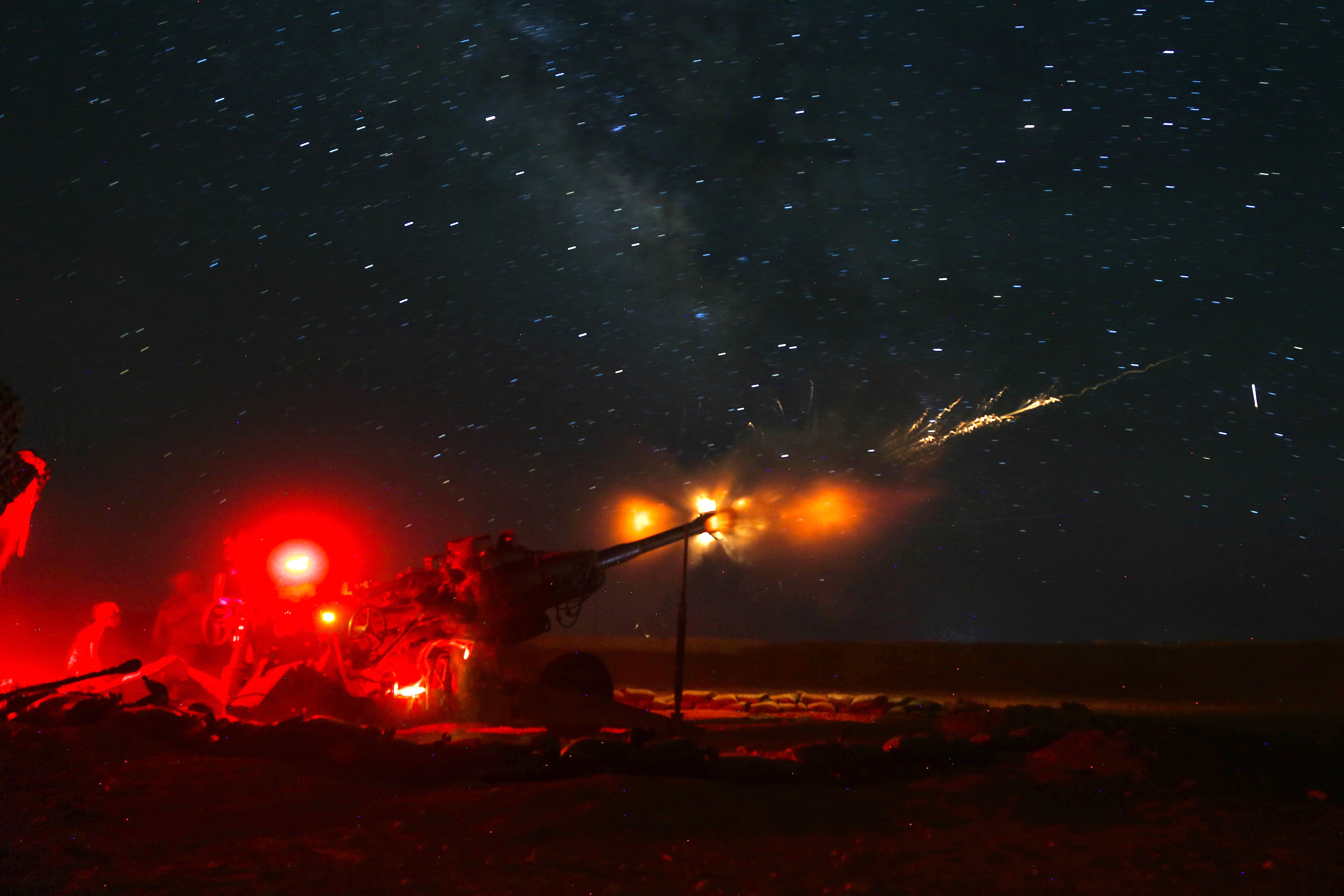
3rd Armored Cavalry Regiment and Iraqi Security Forces personnel fire a howitzer at known Islamic State of Iraq and Syria locations near the Iraqi-Syrian border during Operation Roundup, June 5, 2018.

The Iraqi Army launched its first solely planned and executed high-profile division-level operation March 25, 2008 in the Battle of Basra (2008). The IA received Coalition support only in air support, logistics and via embedded advisors. A British infantry brigade stationed at Basra International Airport was ready in a tactical overwatch role, but it did not intervene.

On January 1, 2009, the Provincial Iraqi Control process was superseded by the U.S.-Iraqi Security Agreement (see also U.S.-Iraq Status of Forces Agreement), which transferred all provinces' security responsibilities to the Iraqi government. Five provinces were transferred at once as a result.

== Military structure ==
The Ministry of Defense (MOD) oversees the forces, as well as the Iraqi Counter Terrorism Bureau, reporting directly to the Prime Minister of Iraq, which oversees the Iraqi Counter Terrorism Service. MOD forces include the Iraqi Army, the Army Aviation Command, the Iraqi Air Force, the Iraqi Navy, the Iraqi Air Defence Command, the Special Security Division (Green Zone protection), and also reportedly the Special Forces Command. The MOD also runs a Joint Staff College, training army, navy, and air force officers, with support from the NATO Training Mission - Iraq. The college was established at Ar Rustamiyah on September 27, 2005. The center runs Junior Staff and Senior Staff Officer Courses designed for first lieutenants to majors.

The Peshmerga, since September 2009 the 'Armed Forces of the Kurdistan Region,' are a separate armed force loyal to the Kurdistan Regional Government. The force is quite sizable. The KDP and PUK both had around 100,000 peshmerga (totalling 200,000) as of January 2010. Two divisions of the army are included in this figure; the regional government and the central government disagree as to whether they are under Baghdad's authority and to what extent.

Iraqi military intelligence has been rebuilt since the army was dissolved in 2003. However, it has suffered from political interference. In mid-2009 Prime Minister al-Maliki reportedly dismissed Major General Jamal Suleiman, the director of military intelligence, and took on the job himself. The Prime minister had reportedly dismissed the director of Iraqi national intelligence at the same time.

=== Iraqi Army ===
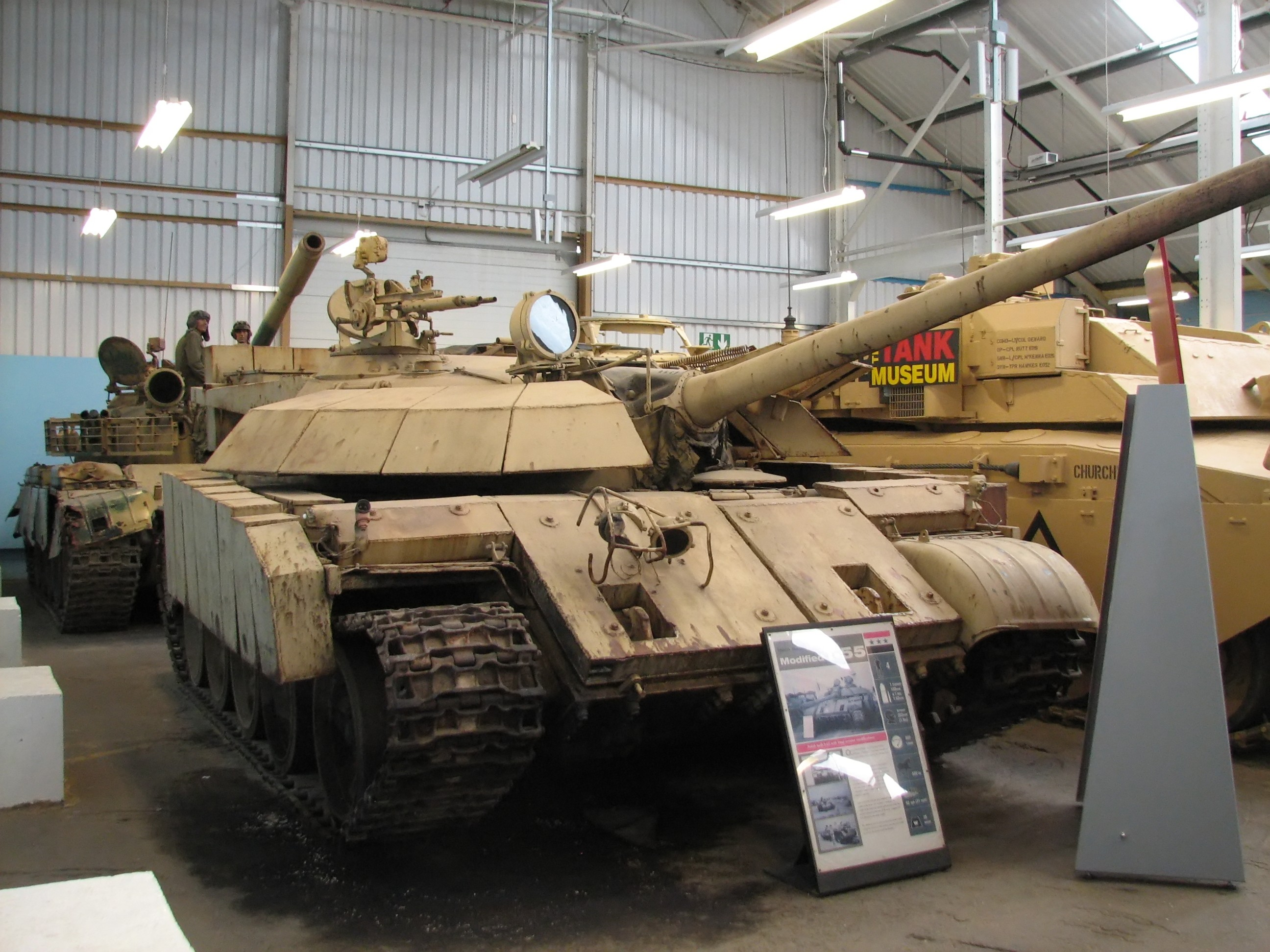
Modified T-55 tank of the 5th Mechanized Division which saw action in the Battle of Khafji

The Iraqi Army, officially the Iraqi Ground Forces (Arabic: القوات البرية العراقية), is the ground force component of the Iraqi Armed Forces. It was known as the Royal Iraqi Army up until the coup of July 1958.

The Iraqi Army in its modern form was first created by the United Kingdom during the inter-war period of British control of Mandatory Iraq. Following the invasion of Iraq by U.S. forces in 2003, the Iraqi Army was rebuilt along U.S. lines with enormous amounts of U.S. assistance at every level. After the Iraqi insurgency coalesced shortly after the invasion, the Iraqi Army was redesigned as a counter-insurgency force. After the withdrawal of U.S. troops in 2010, Iraqi forces assumed full responsibility for the country's security. A New York Times article suggested that, between 2004 and 2014, the U.S. had provided the Iraqi Army with $25 billion in training and equipment in addition to an even larger sum from the Iraqi treasury.

The Iraqi Army was designed as a counter-insurgency force that was developed under United States Army tutelage from 2003 to 2009. The force generation plan as of November 2009 includes 14 divisions, each consisting of 4 brigades. The Iraqi Army was described as the most important element of the counter-insurgency fight. The tactic is to provide security and other services on a local level by using infantrymen on dismounted patrols. As insurgents lose passive or active support from the local population, they will more easily be defeated, it was believed.

Light infantry brigades are equipped with small arms, machine guns, RPGs, body armor and light armored vehicles. Mechanized infantry brigades are equipped with T-54/55 main battle tanks and BMP-1 infantry fighting vehicles. The Hungarian Defence Forces donated 77 Soviet-made T-72 tanks from their own arsenal. The tanks were refurbished by Hungarian specialists and were delivered in fully battle-ready condition in 2004. Training of personnel was also provided to the newly forming Iraqi Army. Iraq was planned to receive 280 M1A1M tanks from 2010 and 2013.

The Army extensively collaborated with Iraqi Popular Mobilization Forces during anti-ISIL operations.

From its creation in 1922 to 2003, the army suffered from a number of serious difficulties, junior tactical leadership among them. "Iraqi forces consistently had problems because of a dearth of technical skills and a limited exposure to machinery." However it also had significant strengths, particularly in two areas: logistics and combat engineering. Two impressive logistical accomplishments of the army included the ability to sustain an armoured corps in Syria during the Yom Kippur War/1973 Arab–Israeli War and their ability to move formations of corps size from one end of the country to another in days during the Iran–Iraq War. Since 2003, creation of combat forces has been the priority, and logistical support was initially supplied in one way or another by the coalition. As of mid 2008, logistical problems included a maintenance crisis and ongoing supply problems. Logistical capabilities have been developing, however, and the build-up of a nationwide logistical structure, with the Taji National Depot at its centre, is now well under way.

=== Iraqi Air Force ===
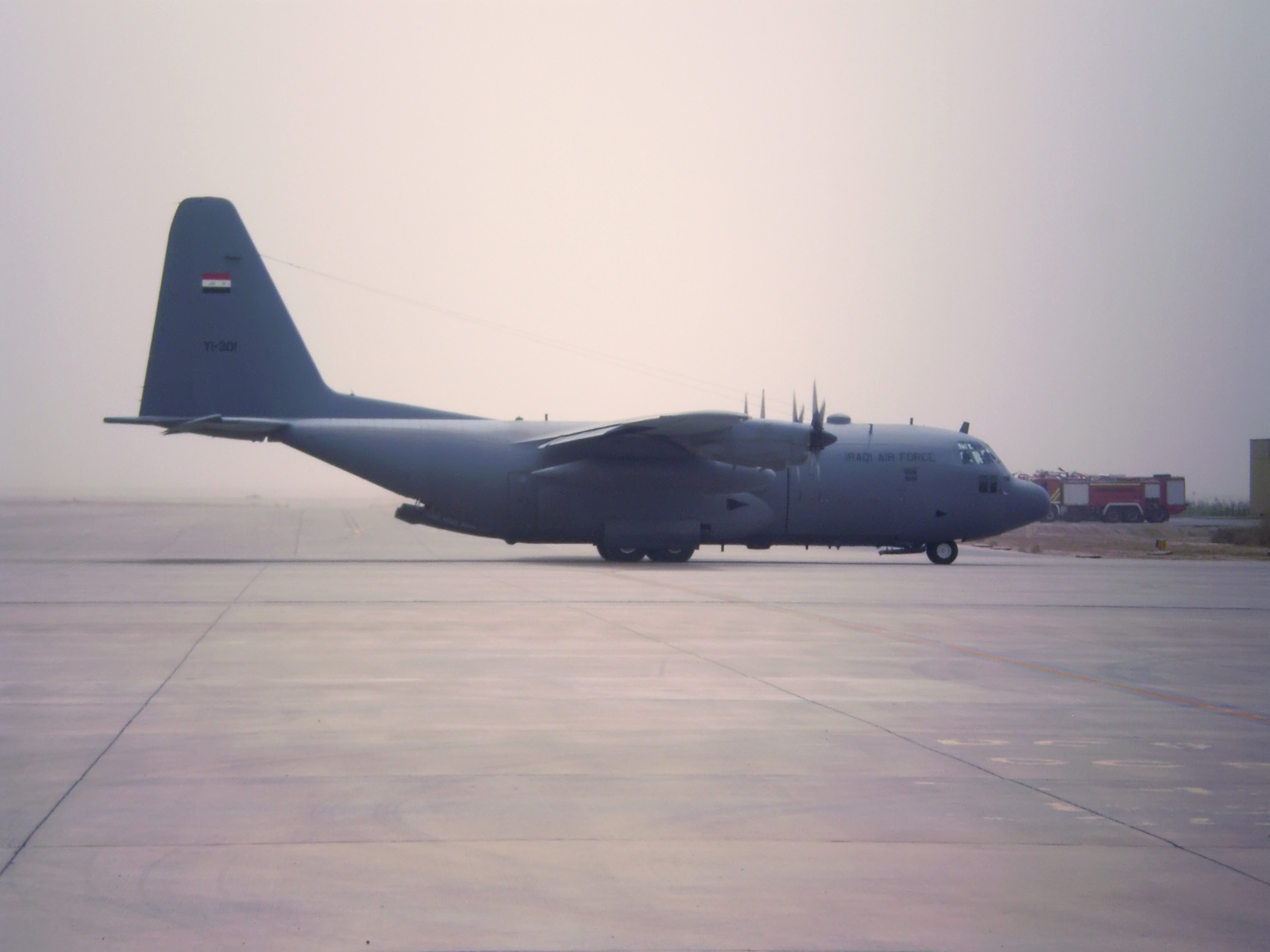
A C-130 Hercules of the Iraqi Air Force

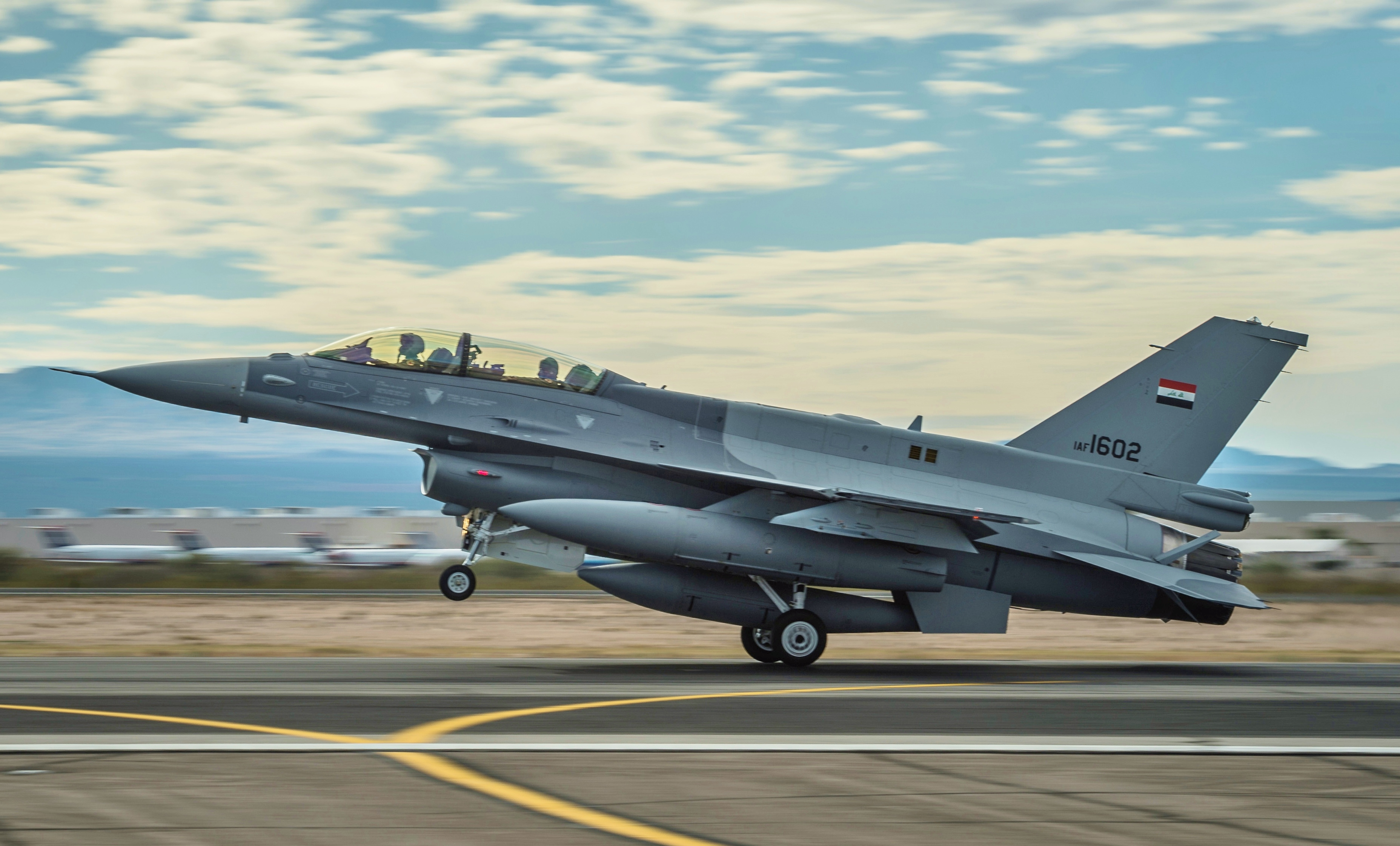
Iraqi F-16D landing at Tucson International Airport

The Iraqi Air Force (IQAF or IrAF) (Arabic: القوات الجوية العراقية, Al Quwwat al Jawwiya al Iraqiya) is the aerial warfare service branch of the Iraqi Armed Forces, responsible for the policing of international borders and surveillance of national assets. The Air Force also supports the Iraqi Navy and the Iraqi Army.

The Royal Iraqi Air Force was founded in 1931, during the period of British control in Iraq after their defeat of the Ottomans in the First World War, with only a few pilots. The Air Force considered its founding day as 22 April 1931, when the first pilots flew in from training in the United Kingdom. Before the creation of the new air force, the RAF Iraq Command was in charge of all British Armed Forces elements in Iraq in the 1920s and early 1930s. The new air force was based at the airport in the Washash neighborhood of Baghdad, and consisted of five pilots, aeronautics students trained at the RAF College Cranwell, and 32 aircraft mechanics. The original five pilots were Natiq Mohammed Khalil al-Tay, Mohammed Ali Jawad, Hafdhi Aziz, Akrem Mushtaq, and Musa Ali. During the early years of the Royal Iraqi Air Force, it mainly received aircraft from the United Kingdom as well as Breda Ba.65 attack planes and SM-79 bombers from Italy.

In the years following Iraqi independence, the Air Force was still dependent on the Royal Air Force. The Iraqi government allocated the majority of its military expenditure to the Army and by 1936 the Royal Iraqi Air Force had only 37 pilots and 55 aircraft. The following year, the Air Force increased its number of pilots to 127. The air force used both Soviet and British aircraft throughout the 1950s and 1960s. When Saddam Hussein came to power in 1979, the air force grew quickly when Iraq ordered more Soviet and French aircraft. The air force's peak came after the long Iran–Iraq War, which ended in 1988, when it consisted of 1029 aircraft of all types (of which 550 were combat aircraft), becoming the largest air force in the region. Its downfall came during the Gulf War (1990–91) and continued as U.S. and allied forces enforced no-fly zones. The remains of Iraq's air force were destroyed during the 2003 invasion of Iraq.

After the invasion, the Air Force was rebuilt, receiving most of its training and aircraft from the United States. In 2007, Iraq asked Iran to return some of the scores of Iraqi fighter planes that flew there to escape destruction during the Gulf War in 1991. As of 2014, Iran was receptive to the demands and was working on refurbishing an unspecified number of aircraft.

U.S. Air Forces Central Command, in coordination with Combined Joint Task Force – Operation Inherent Resolve, stood up a Coalition Aviation Advisory and Training Team in Iraq on February 1, 2018. It was intended to "train, advise and assist the Iraqi Army Aviation Command, Iraqi Air Defense Command and the Iraqi Air Force."

In 1988 the Iraqi Air Defence Command had about 10,000 personnel. By 2002 it had four air defence sectors and at least five missile brigades, the 145th, 146th, 147th, 148th, and 195th. It was commanded by General Yassin Mohammed Shaheen, who had been deputy air defence commander during the 1991 Gulf War, and had an estimated strength of about 17,000. The four regional SOCs co-ordinated SAM and anti-aircraft gun batteries. The longer-range SAMs consist primarily of the SA-2 and SA-3, with the SA-6 fulfilling a mobile, medium-range role. Jane's reported in May 2002 that other equipment includes Roland SAMs, anti-aircraft guns, and a mix of Western and Soviet-designed radar.

=== Iraqi Navy ===
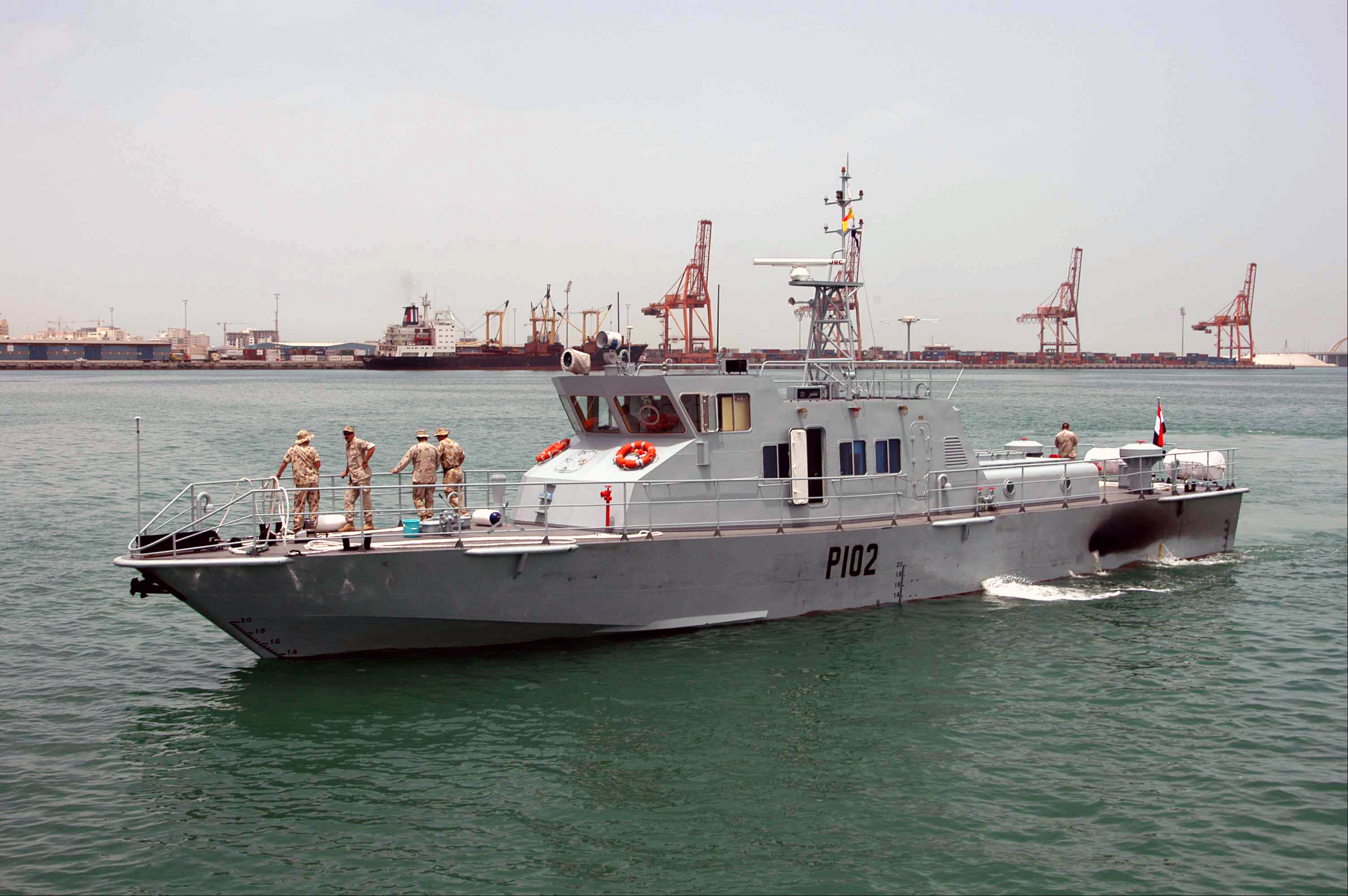
An Iraqi Coastal Defense Force patrol craft prepares to moor in Manama, Bahrain.

The Iraqi Navy (Arabic: القوات البحرية العراقية) is one of the components of the Armed Forces. Its primary responsibilities are the protection of Iraq's coastline and offshore assets. It was formed in 1937 as a small four-ship force headquartered in Basra. Between 1937 and 1958, it was primarily a riverine force. Following the 14 July Revolution of 1958, the Iraqi Navy began to expand. Based in the port of Umm Qasr, the Arabic Gulf Academy for Sea Studies was established in Basra, which offered a bachelor's degree in war and engineering naval studies. By 1988, the Navy grew to a force of 5,000, but played a relatively small role during the 1980–1988 Iran–Iraq War. Much of the Navy was destroyed during Operation Pearl.

Between 1977 and 1987, the Iraqi Navy received eight Osa-class missile boats, armed with P-15 Termit ("Styx") anti-ship missiles, from the Soviet Union. It also purchased four Lupo-class frigates and six Assad-class corvettes from Italy, although these were never delivered because of international sanctions following the Iraqi invasion of Kuwait in 1990.

The Iraqi Navy was almost completely destroyed by the Royal Navy during the Gulf War of 1991. The force had 19 ships sunk and 6 vessels damaged. In total, more than 100 Iraqi ships were destroyed. The Navy was not rebuilt and played little part in the Iraq War (2003). One Soviet patrol boat was destroyed. One exception was two mine warfare vessels captured by US Navy and Coast Guard units during the assault on Al Faw; The tug Jumariya, towing a well camouflaged minelaying barge, and the tug Al Raya, which had been outfitted as a minelayer itself. Of the units that remained by late 2002, most were in a poor state of repair and the crews were in a poor state of readiness. Whatever units that remained after 1991 were used primarily for safeguarding Saddam's palaces on the Tigris river.

The Navy "was reformed in 2003 around five Taiwanese-built 28-meter Predator -class patrol boats, calling itself the Iraqi Coast Guard until December 2004, when it assumed the navy title." By the time the force "assumed its new identity as the Iraqi Navy in December [2004], it had mustered a force of 600, including 200 naval infantry who guard" Iraq's two oil platforms."

In July 2008 it was reported that the Iraqi Navy was building a second Marine battalion. As of February 2011, the navy had approximately 5,000 sailors and marines which formed an operational headquarters, five afloat squadrons, and two marine battalions.

Headed by Rear Admiral Muhammad Jawad, the navy had plans to build six Al Uboor-class patrol boats in Baghdad, with the first of the boats to enter service in September 2005. This project however, was ultimately canceled. Additionally, two Assad-class corvettes built for Iraq in the 1980s by Italy were originally planned to be delivered sometime around 2006–2007. The ships however, were found to be in a worse state than originally believed, forcing the Iraqi navy to reconsider the deal and instead buy 4, newer, smaller modified-Diciotti class vessels.

The Iraqi Navy is designed for coastal water protection; preventing the smuggling of people, oil and weapons; and to protect the country's oil platforms. As a result, it mainly needs patrol boats. These may be backed up by fast attack craft. The patrol boats need to have the ability to launch Rigid-hulled inflatable boat for boarding ships and also possibly be able to accommodate a helicopter which would increase their patrol capability. In 2016 the Iraqi Navy awarded money to a ship maintenance company to sustain its current fleet of ships.

=== Challenges for the armed forces ===
Poor levels of internal security have stifled attempts to build any national banking or credit systems. In lieu of such organizations, Iraqi units operate at any given time with an estimated 10–20% absenteeism rate due to soldiers temporarily leaving their units to deliver their pay back to their families. This can be especially grueling if the unit is on deployment outside of their home province as the absenteeism time is naturally increased.

In addition, all military hospitals under the Ba'athist-led regime were looted and abandoned during the 2003 invasion of Iraq; resulting in a lack of medical equipment for the Iraqi military. There was only one military prosthetics facility in the country and virtually no mental health or burn treatment services. Wounded Iraqi soldiers are expected to receive treatment either at civilian hospitals or if possible, at Coalition medical facilities. Corruption practices spurred partly by over-taxation at these civilian hospitals significantly drive up costs to the soldier. Due to overwhelming red tape within the Iraqi military compensation system, it is commonplace for the soldier to end up bearing the financial brunt of medical expenses.

=== Military equipment purchases from the United States ===
U.S. foreign military sales (FMS) to Iraq during the fiscal year 2020 included:

- AeroVironment unmanned aircraft systems, maintenance, and training
- BAE Systems Inc. MK90 grain
- Chemring cartridge actuated devices/propellant actuated devices, which can be used in ejection seats
- General Dynamics vehicle logistics support and training in Taji, Iraq
- Lockheed Martin long range radar systems
- Lockheed Martin Integrated Air Defense System sustainment
- Navistar Defense transport trucks, recovery vehicles, and spare parts
- Northrop Grumman ATK contractor logistic support for Iraq's Textron Cessna 208 and Cessna 172 fleet
- Rapiscan Systems contractor logistics support for M60 mobile scanning vehicle systems
- Scientia Global digital mobile radio equipment and training
- Spartan Air Academy contractor logistics support for T-6A aircraft at Balad Air Base
- M16A4 rifles from Colt and FN America LLC.

== International defense cooperation ==
During the occupation, from 2003 to 2010, the U.S. Department of Defense took the major role in assuring Iraq's exterior defense. The U.S. command responsible was initially Combined Joint Task Force 7, then Multi-National Force – Iraq, and then United States Forces – Iraq. USF-I was established on January 1, 2010, and withdrew on December 31, 2011, following the conclusion of the occupation. Thereafter defense responsibility transitioned completely to the Iraqis. The Defense Security Cooperation Agency facilitated buying of U.S. weapons. Residual assistance efforts were then managed by the Office of Security Cooperation, Iraq, headed by Lieutenant General Robert L. Caslen. OSC-Iraq was established on October 1, 2011. Lt Gen John M. Bednarek succeeded Caslen.

While Iran has been accused of involvement in the Iraqi insurgency, the Iranian government also publicly offered help to build up the Iraqi armed forces. Then-Iraqi Defence Minister Saadoun al-Dulaimi met with his Iranian colleague Rear Admiral Ali Shamkhani in Tehran in 2005, and the Iranians pledged to give assistance.

In 2010, U.S. Army Major General Tony Cucolo mentioned Operation Bright Star as an example of a possible joint training exercise component of a future U.S.–Iraq military-to-military relationship.

In July 2015, during the war against ISIS and in response to a request by the Iraqi government, NATO agreed to provide defence and related security capacity-building support. In April 2016, NATO began conducting a number of “train-the-trainer’’ courses in Jordan for Iraqis (more than 350 Iraqi security and military personnel were trained). Then, following a request from the Iraqi Prime Minister, at the Warsaw Summit in July 2016 NATO Leaders agreed to provide NATO training and capacity-building activities to Iraqi security and military forces within Iraq. In January 2017, NATO deployed a modest but scalable Core Team to Baghdad of eight civilian and military personnel, setting up NATO’s permanent presence in Iraq. Jordan-based training transferred to Iraq in February 2017.

In 2018, at the NATO Summit in Brussels, following a request from the Iraqi government, NATO leaders agreed to launch a new training mission in Iraq called NATO Mission Iraq (NMI). This new mission was established in Baghdad in October 2018.

NATO Mission Iraq is focused on capacity-building, mentoring, and advising Iraqi national defence institutions through a series of activities conducted with full respect for Iraq’s sovereignty and territorial integrity. It is designed to help Iraqi security institutions further develop and sustain their capacity. NATO works closely with the Iraqi Ministry of Defence to train members of the Iraqi Military under the direct control of the Government of Iraq.

The NMI training activities are based in Baghdad in the Ministry of Defence, Office of the National Security Advisor, and other national security institutions. In addition, NMI will have training activities in the University of Defence, Computer Science School, Military Medical School, Bomb Disposal (EOD/C‐IED) School, Armour School, School of Electrical and Mechanical Engineering, School of Military Engineering, School of Transportation, School of Administration and Logistics, Military Signals School, Military Intelligence and Security School, and Non Commissioned Officers Academy.

== See also ==
- List of current equipment of the Iraqi Ground Forces
- Uniforms of Iraqi Armed Forces
- Military ranks of Iraq

== Bibliography ==
- Al-Marashi, Ibrahim; Salama, Sammy (2008). Iraq's Armed Forces: An Analytical History. London and New York: Routledge. ISBN 978-0-415-40078-7. (one callmark UA853.I72 ALM)
- Broder, JOHN M.; Jehl, DOUGLAS (13 August 1990). "Iraqi Army: World's 5th Largest but Full of Vital Weaknesses : Military: It will soon be even larger. But its senior staff is full of incompetents, and only a third of its troops are experienced". Los Angeles Times. Archived from the original on 16 March 2016.
- "Iraq (Military and Security)". The World Factbook. Central Intelligence Agency. 2023-03-02. Archived from the original on March 2, 2023.
- "Constitution of Iraq (2005)". ConstituteProject.
- Friedman, Norman (1992). Desert Victory: The War for Kuwait. United States Naval Institute Press (distributed by Airlife Publishing Ltd. in UK). ISBN 1-55750-255-2.
- IISS (2019). The Military Balance 2019. Routledge. ISBN 978-1857439885.
- Metz, Helen Chapin (1988). Iraq: A Country Study. Washington: GPO for the Library of Congress.
- Pollack, Kenneth M. (2002). Arabs at War: Military Effectiveness, 1948–91. Lincoln and London: University of Nebraska Press. ISBN 978-0-8032-3733-9.
- Rathmell, Andrew, Olga Oliker, Terrence K. Kelly, David Brannan, and Keith Crane, eds. Developing Iraq’s Security Sector: The Coalition Provisional Authority’s Experience. MG-365-OSD. Santa Monica, CA: RAND Corporation, 2005.
- Rayburn, Joel D; Sobchak, Frank K (2019). The U.S. Army in the Iraq War – Volume 1: Invasion – Insurgency – Civil War, 2003-2006. Carlisle, PA: Strategic Studies Institute and U.S. Army War College Press.
- Robinson, Colin D. (2022). "Why Did Rebuilding the Afghan and Iraqi Armies Fail?". The RUSI Journal. 167 (4–5): 26–39. doi:10.1080/03071847.2022.2149124. S2CID 254388006.
- Wright, Donald R.; Reese, Timothy (2008). On Point II Transition to the New Campaign: The U.S. Army in Operation Iraqi Freedom May 2003-January 2005. Fort Leavenworth, KS: Combat Studies Institute Press.
