= Uniforms of Iraqi Armed Forces =

During the Ottoman era, Iraqi troops wore standardized red and green Ottoman uniforms. Post‑1920 until its independence on 1932, Iraqis saw British influence, introducing khaki shirts and trousers tailored to the climate. In 1980s, uniform of Iraqi troops consisted of service and field attire for both summer and winter and a dress uniform and mess jacket for officers. The winter service dress uniform, of olive drab wool, consisted of a single-breasted coat having patch pockets with flaps, a khaki shirt and tie, and trousers that were usually cuffless. The summer uniform was similar but was made of light tan material. The winter field uniform consisted of an olive drab shirt, wool trousers, and a waist-length jacket. The summer field uniform was identical in style but was made of lighter material. Both field uniforms included a web belt, a beret or helmet, and high-top shoes.

Commissioned officers' rank insignia were identical for the army and for the air force, except that shoulder boards were olive drab for the army and were blue for the air force. Naval officer rank insignia consisted of gold stripes worn on the lower sleeve. Army and air force enlisted personnel wore stripes on the sleeve to designate rank, while the top noncommissioned officer rank, sergeant major and chief master sergeant, respectively, consisted of a gold bar on top of the shoulders.

The Iraqi Armed Forces have worn dozens of different camouflage since Iran-Iraq War. Most of these camouflage are sourced, imported (or captured) from other countries, and some camouflage are locally-made. Most of all camouflage uniform are issued for special unit only, such as commando units in the Army, Special Forces and the Republican Guard. Following U.S Invasion of Iraq in 2003, the entire Iraqi Armed Forces were restructured.

The average Iraqi soldier is equipped with an assortment of uniforms ranging from the Desert Camouflage Uniform, the six color "Chocolate Chip" DBDU and the woodland pattern BDU to the US MARPAT or Jordanian KA7. The ISOF using Chinese PLA Type 03 camouflage and U.S. Multicam. In January 2025, Iraqi armed forces introduced their newest pixelated camouflage uniforms during the celebration of their 104th anniversary. This new pattern is a hybrid, incorporating pixel clusters, and geometric shapes. The colors used on this pattern are organic shapes in tones of yellowish sand, medium brown, and light brown on a very light sand background.

Pre-2003 Attire
Name/Origin	Image	Issued by	Notes
Denison smock (United Kingdom)		Iraqi Armed Forces	Issued only to airborne personnel.
Lizard (France)		Iraqi Armed Forces	
Disruptive Pattern Material (United Kingdom)		Iraqi Armed Forces	Introduced to its Armed Forces in the late 1980s, some dessert variant are captured from Kuwaiti Forces during Iraqi invasion of Kuwait.
ERDL pattern (United States)		Iraqi Armed Forces, Iraqi Republican Guard, Iraqi Military College	Introduced to its Armed Forces in the mid- to late-1980s.
M81 Woodland-style (United States)		Iraqi Armed Forces, Iraqi Republican Guard	Also used by Iraqi Special Republican Guard.
Desert Camouflage Pattern (United States)		Iraqi Republican Guard	Limited use.
2003-Present Attire
M81 Woodland-style (United States)		Iraqi Ground Forces	Inherited from Saddam's regime armed forces.
Desert Camouflage Pattern (Chocolate Chip) (United States)		Iraqi Ground Forces, Iraqi Navy, Iraqi Air Defence Command	Issued from 2004.
Desert Camouflage Pattern (United States)		Iraqi Ground Forces, Iraqi Navy, Iraqi Air Force	Issued from 2006, alongside with Chocolate Chip.
Tiger stripe camouflage (United States)		Iraqi Special Operations Forces	Used by 36th Commando Battalion.
KA2 desert digital camouflage pattern (Jordan)		Iraqi Ground Forces, Iraqi Special Operations Forces	Limited use.
Type 07 "arid" pattern camouflage (China)		Iraqi Special Operations Forces	Small amount.
MultiCam (United States)		Iraqi Ground Forces, Iraqi Special Operations Forces	
MARPAT-Style (United States)		Iraqi Ground Forces, Iraqi Navy, Iraqi Air Force, Iraqi Special Operations Forces	Woodland pattern issued by some unit, including ISOF. Dessert variant issued by some unit, alongside with DCU.
"Hybrid-pixelated" Camouflage (Iraq)		Iraqi Ground Forces, Iraqi Navy, Iraqi Air Force	Standard issue.
