= Muzahim Saab Hassan =

Iraqi military officer

Lieutenant General Muzahim Sa'ab Hassan al-Tikriti
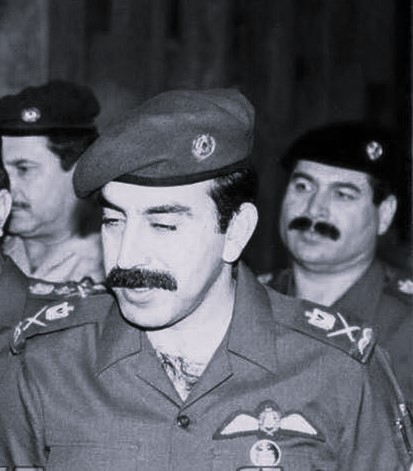
- Sa'ab in 1989
- Born: 1949 (age 76–77); Al-Awja, Tikrit, Kingdom of Iraq
- Military career
- Allegiance: Iraq
- Branch: Iraqi Air Force; Iraqi Air Defence Force
- Service years: 1973–2003
- Rank: Lieutenant General
- Commands: Air Defense Forces
- Conflicts: Iran–Iraq War; Gulf War; 1991 uprisings in Iraq; Iraq War

Muzahim Sa'ab Hassan al-Tikriti (Arabic: مزاحم صعب حسن التكريتي; born 1949) is a former Iraqi military officer who served as the commander of the Iraqi Air Defense Forces under the rule of Saddam Hussein from 1999 until 2003.

He was the "Queen of Diamonds" in the US deck of most-wanted Iraqi playing cards and was taken into custody on 23 April 2003.

The Supreme Iraqi Criminal Tribunal issued a warrant against Hassan for crimes committed during the 1991 uprisings in Iraq.

Hassan was released from custody in April 2012.
