= Operation Southern Focus =

Military operation

- Part of Iraqi no-fly zones conflict
Date	June 2002 – 17 March 2003
Location	Southern Iraq
Result	Successful reduction of Iraqi air defense systems

Belligerents
United States	Republic of Iraq

Commanders and leaders
George W. Bush (President of the United States) T. Michael Moseley (USCENTAF Commander)	Saddam Hussein (President of Iraq); Hamid Raja Shalah (Air Force Commander) Muzahim Saab Hassan (Air Defence Commander)

Casualties and losses
1 MQ-1 Predator destroyed	Unknown, many air defense systems destroyed

Operation Southern Focus was a period in the months leading up to the 2003 invasion of Iraq (called "Operation Iraqi Freedom" in the United States) in which the U.S. military's responses to violations of the southern Iraqi no-fly zones were increased, with more intensive bombing of air defense artillery installations and other Iraqi military complexes. It also marked a period of increased intelligence gathering by the U.S. The operation lasted from June 2002 until the beginning of the invasion in March 2003. It was intended to be a "softening up" period prior to the invasion, degrading Iraq's air defense and communication abilities. Lieutenant General T. Michael Moseley revealed the operation's existence in mid-2003.

== Operation ==
The operation was not publicly declared at the time, and was just said to be an intensification of the already-existing Operation Southern Watch. When it began, the United States Defense Department and CENTCOM stated that increasing numbers of bombings of Iraqi installations in the region were merely in response to more attacks by the air-defense forces of that country. The Iraqi no-fly zones had been patrolled continuously since the end of the 1991 Gulf War, and bombings by American and coalition fighter aircraft had taken place on a regular basis. However, Southern Focus saw many more engagements. Coalition forces responded to 651 attacks by dropping 606 bombs on 391 targets over the course of the operation.

== Bombs usage ==
The tonnage of bombs dropped increased from 0 in March 2002 and 0.3 in April 2002 to between 7 and 14 tons per month in May–August, reaching a pre-war peak of 54.6 tons in September – prior to Congress' 11 October authorisation of the invasion. The September attacks included a 5 September 100-aircraft attack on the main air defence site in western Iraq. According to New Statesman this was "Located at the furthest extreme of the southern no-fly zone, far away from the areas that needed to be patrolled to prevent attacks on the Shias, it was destroyed not because it was a threat to the patrols, but to allow allied special forces operating from Jordan to enter Iraq undetected."

== Success ==
Iraq's only success came on 23 December 2002, when a USAF RQ-1 Predator UAV was experimentally armed with AIM-92 Stingers, a type of air-to-air missile system, and sent to patrol the no-fly zone in an attempt to bait Iraqi fighters into combat. It was spotted by two Iraqi MiG-23s and attacked, however both planes were unable to achieve a lock-on. A MiG-25 of the 1st Fighter-Interceptor Squadron was then scrambled to assist. Both aircraft fired missiles at each other, however, the Iraqi jet was outside of the range of the Stinger so the American missile fell short. The Iraqi missile hit the Predator, destroying it. This was the first time an unmanned aircraft had been used in air-to-air combat.

The first combat use of the U.S. Navy's new F/A-18E Super Hornet fighter-bomber occurred in November 2002 during Operation Southern Focus, when aircraft from Strike Fighter Squadron 115 (VFA-115) flying from the aircraft carrier USS Abraham Lincoln (CVN-72) struck surface-to-air missile sites and command and control targets near Al Kut.

== See also ==
- Downing Street memo
- Operation Rockingham
