= 2002 Prestige Airlines Boeing 707 crash =

Fatal passenger plane crash in Bangui, Central African Republic

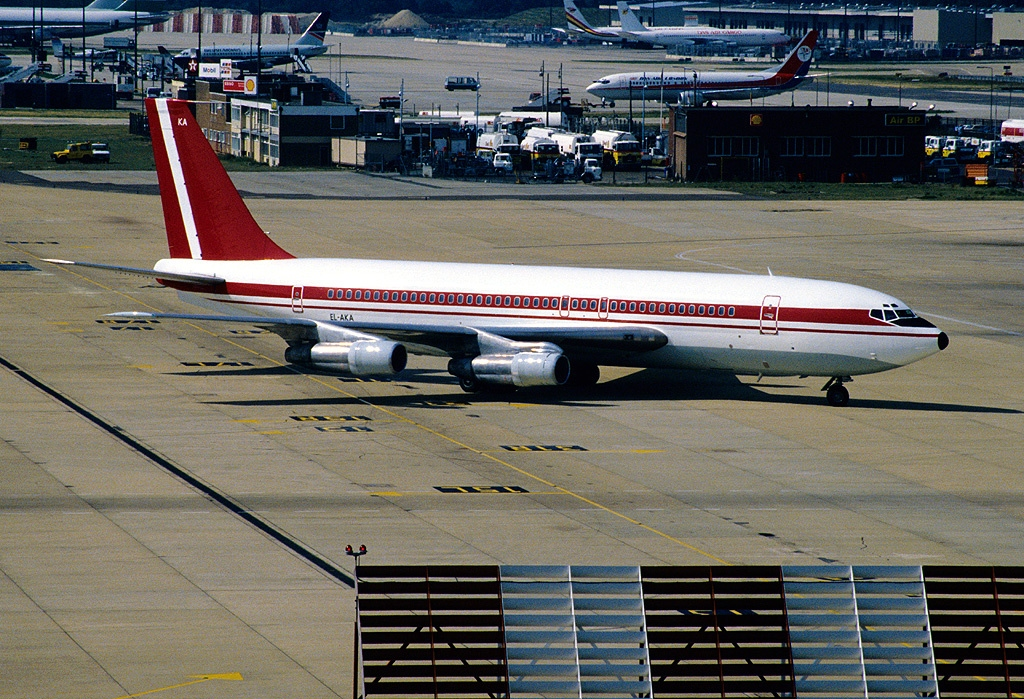
- The aircraft involved in the accident with a previous operator

Accident
- Date: 4 July 2002
- Summary: Crashed on approach
- Site: Guitangola, near Bangui Airport, Central African Republic; 4°21′49″N 18°31′55″E

Aircraft
- Aircraft type: Boeing 707-123B
- Operator: Prestige Airlines
- Registration: 9XR-IS
- Flight origin: N'Djamena Airport, N'Djamena, Chad
- Destination: Maya-Maya Airport, Brazzaville, Republic of the Congo
- Occupants: 30
- Passengers: 21
- Crew: 9
- Fatalities: 28
- Injuries: 2
- Survivors: 2

On 4 July 2002, a Boeing 707 operated by Prestige Airlines crashed whilst attempting an emergency landing at Bangui Airport, killing 28 of the 30 people on board. The flight was bound for Brazzaville, but the crew decided to divert to Bangui when the landing gear failed to retract.

== Background ==
The passengers consisted of 17 Chadians on board. The Boeing 707 belonged to airline New Gomair, owned by a local businessmen, but was chartered by Prestige Airlines at the time of the accident.

== Crash ==
On the final approach to Bangui, the aircraft descended until it contacted the ground. The crash occurred in clear weather at about 11:15 a.m. local time in the neighborhood of Guitangola, two miles short of the Bangui Airport's runway. The aircraft exploded upon touchdown, scattering wreckage and reportedly causing the roof of an empty house to collapse.

The two survivors were engineer Laurent Tabako and a woman from Chad; both were admitted to a hospital. According to Tabako, the engines stopped before landing and the crew may have dumped too much fuel before an emergency landing. The witnesses reportedly did not hear the usual engine noise during the crash and saw no flames when the aircraft disintegrated. The aircraft's flight recorder and voice recorder were recovered and an investigation was launched by the government of the Central African Republic.

The flight had requested an emergency landing due to a "technical incident".
