= 2002 Jalandhar MiG-21 crash =

Aviation incident in Jalandhar, India

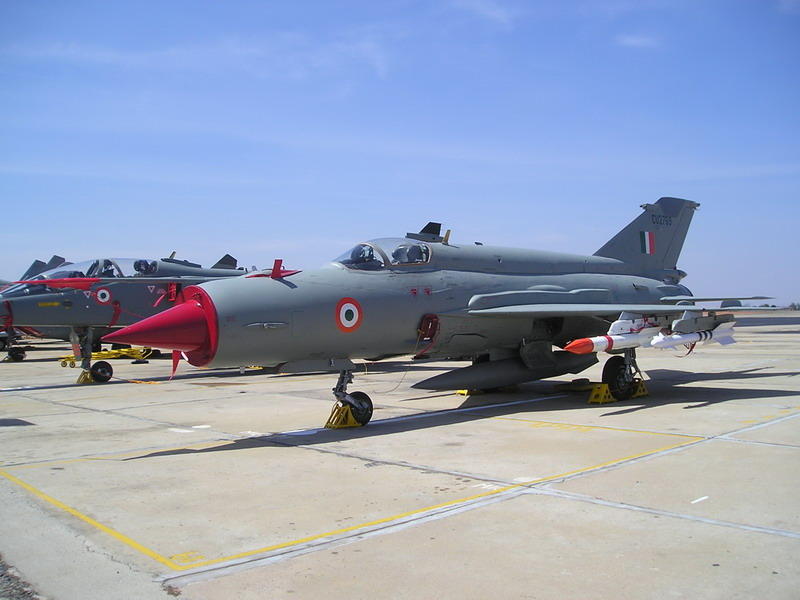
- An Indian Air Force MiG-21, similar to the aircraft which crashed

Occurrence
- Date: 3 May 2002
- Summary: Engine failure, Ejection
- Site: Jalandhar, Punjab, India
- Total fatalities: 8
- Total injuries: 17

Aircraft
- Aircraft type: Mikoyan-Gurevich MiG-21
- Operator: Indian Air Force
- Flight origin: Adampur Air Force Station, Adampur
- Destination: Adampur Air Force Station
- Passengers: 0
- Crew: 1
- Fatalities: 0
- Injuries: 0
- Survivors: 1

Ground casualties
- Ground fatalities: 8
- Ground injuries: 17

On 3 May 2002, an Indian Air Force (IAF) Mikoyan-Gurevich MiG-21 bis crashed into an office building in Jalandhar, Punjab, India, killing eight and injuring 17 people on the ground. The pilot, who ejected from the aircraft, survived. A number of passers-by were also injured as they attempted to rescue people trapped in the buildings.

== Overview ==
The aircraft, piloted by Flt Lt SK Nayak, had taken off from Adampur Air Force base about 10:00am, five minutes prior to the crash. The pilot reported that he "heard some unusual noise followed by an explosion in the engine", and ejected.

The aircraft crashed into the Jalandhar branch of the Bank of Rajasthan, located in a heavily populated residential and commercial section of the city. The crash started a large fire in the bank and the adjoining lumber store. Pieces of the aircraft also landed on nearby homes. The first firefighting units to respond could not find water sources with which to fight the blaze, which was not attacked until Indian Army trucks with foam arrived on scene. It took 40 fire units five hours to contain the fire.

At least one news source reported that a copilot had also ejected; however, the MiG-21bis is a single seat aircraft. Following the crash, the IAF suspended all MiG-21 flight training operations.

== Safety record ==
The safety record of the IAF's MiG-21s has raised concern in the Indian Parliament and media, leading to the aircraft sometimes being referred to in the IAF as a "flying coffin". One source estimates that in the nine years from 1993 to 2002, the IAF lost over 100 pilots in 283 accidents. During its service life, the IAF has lost at least 116 aircraft to crashes (not including those lost in combat), with 81 of those occurring since 1990.

"Prior to discussion on the accident proneness or otherwise of the MiG-21 aircraft, the figures of loss of 221 aircraft and 100 pilots during the period 1991-2000 appear to be incorrect. During this period, 221 MiG-21 were never lost nor 100 pilots lost their lives in MiG-21 accidents. The figures as reported perhaps are the total loss of IAF aircraft involving all the types operated by the service. It is also possible that the figures were wrongly reported in the press."

The age of the MiG-21s, and their safety record, led the Public Accounts Committee of Parliament to call for their immediate phase-out in a March, 2002 report, and this crash added urgency to that recommendation. However, Chief of Air Staff, Air Chief Marshal S. Krishnaswamy and Air Chief Marshal A.Y. Tipnis have stated that the aircraft are "fit to fly". Besides the raw age of the aircraft, their maintenance and upkeep have been called into question.

Other sources blame the accident rate on failures in the pilot training system.

A similar crash occurred on 14 June 1986, when the pilot of a MiG-21 taking off from an air base in Bareilly, India, ejected. The aircraft crashed into nearby Rampurmasi Village, killing 13 people on the ground.
