= Irkut A-002 =

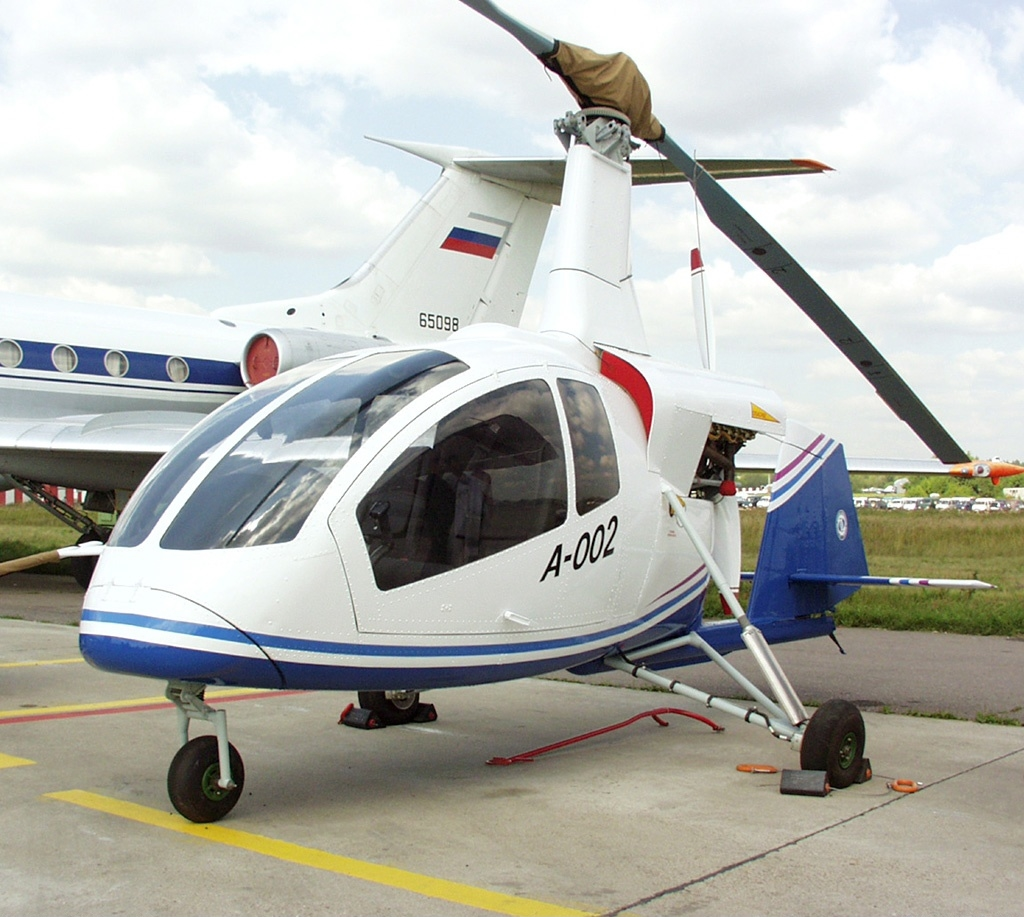

General information
- Type: Three seat autogyro
- National origin: Russia
- Manufacturer: Irkut Corporation
- Designer: Andrey Tatarnikov
- Status: development
- Primary user: IrkutskEnergo
- Number built: 5

History
- Introduction date: 2012 (expected)
- First flight: 21 April 2002

The Irkut A-002 is a three-seat, pusher configuration autogyro developed in Russia through the 2000s by the United Constructor Bureau for Light Aircraft team of the Irkutsk Aircraft Production Association (IAPO) "Irkut" as the first independent product. Take-off is possible when wind speed exceeds 8 m/s, otherwise a running start of up to 15 m is necessary. The riveted covering is made of duralumin. The first produced consignment consisted of five autogyros. The A-002M is a further development.

== Design and development ==
The A-002 has an enclosed, streamlined cabin accessed by large, windowed side doors. The two front seats have dual control, and there is a third seat behind. The fully enclosed, pusher-configuration flat-four AviaSmart engine is situated behind the cabin with a pair of cooling air intakes above its roof. The propeller thrustline is at cabin roof height. The two-blade rotor is mounted on a tall streamlined pylon at the rear of the cabin. In flight the rotor is undriven, but it can be spun up by the engine for jump starts made with no take-off run. Without this spin-up, take-off requires a run of 30 m (98 ft).

The A-002 has composite tail surfaces mounted on a short boom joined to the bottom of the cabin/engine pod. The fin carries a mass- and horn-balanced rudder and an all-moving tailplane at ⅓ fin height. The A-002 has a fixed, wide track tricycle undercarriage with main wheels on cantilever spring legs.

The first flight was on 6 July 2002. Production of five A-002s began in August 2002, but production was halted for further development and no deliveries were made until 2004,. Several revisions were made, including much-enlarged engine air intakes and the addition of endplate fins to the tailpane. The maximum take-off weight (MTOW) of the A-200 increased from 900 to 950 kg (1,980 to 2,090 lb), and both the rotor and fuselage were significantly extended. The more recent A-002M upgrade further raised the MTOW to 1,030 kg (2,270 lb). There have been tests of four- and six-bladed propellers.

In 2005 the autogyro project participated in the Russian Innovation Contest where it was declared that at least 150 units should be sold to pay back the project. In 2006 a renewed version with an AviaSmart engine and a new extended main rotor was named A-002M. In 2008 it was declared about the certification of such autogyro type that year according to the actual aviation rules, however, even by 2012 the certificate has not been received yet. In 2010 they published a specification for a heavier version of A-002M at higher cost. The possibility of jump take-off remained, but it is not considered regular any more due to enhanced load on the bearing structure. It was also reported about developing of the unmanned version. One case of the autogyro's experimental operation by the IrkutskEnergo company in 2006 is known; no further cooperation with this company was reported.

== Operational history ==
By late 2003 twenty A-002s had been ordered by Susuman Susumanzoloto OAO, a mining company which had received two, and by Irkutskehenergo OAO, which had received another two for power-line inspections. Five had been delivered by 2007.

== Variants ==
A-002
Original version.
A-002M
Heavier upgrade, specification released 2010.

== Failures and incidents ==
On July 24, 2012, at 17:15 local time the autogyro Irkut-A002M made an emergency landing to the moorland near Bokovo, the Irkutsk region. The lone pilot was uninjured. The preliminary version stated that the failure was caused by a crack in the oil header of the main rotor forced-start drive, which caused oil leakage in the autogyro's general oil system. The inexperienced pilot did not notice loss of oil pressure and continued the flight. The apparatus crash-landed on the main rotor autorotation and suffered severe damage attributed to poor piloting.

== Specifications (A-002M prototype) ==
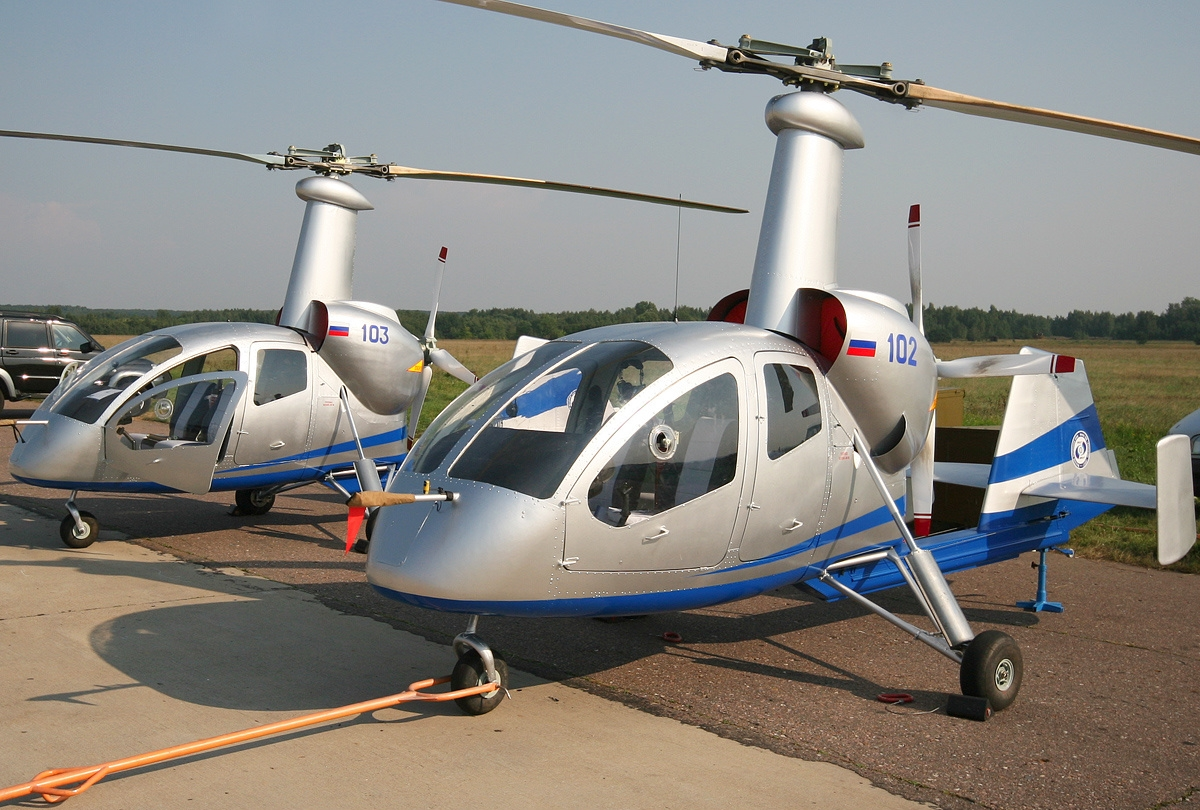
A-002M and A-002 at MAKS-2007 air show

Data from Jane's All the World's Aircraft 2011/12.

General characteristics

- Crew: 1
- Capacity: 2 passengers or 350 kg of cargo
- Length: 4.98 m (16 ft 4 in) fuselage, not including rotor
- Width: 2.40 m (7 ft 10 in) wheeltrack
- Height: 3.20 m (10 ft 6 in) without rotor
- Empty weight: 420 kg (926 lb)
- Max takeoff weight: 800 kg (1,764 lb) overloaded (normal=750 kg)
- Fuel capacity: 108 kg: 150L (39.6 US gal, 33.0 Imp gal)
- Powerplant: 1 × AviaSmart B-H4K flat-four cylinder piston with fluid cooling; digital control unit, 198 kW (265 hp)
- Main rotor diameter: 2-blade rotor, 1 × 10.30 m (33 ft 10 in)
- Main rotor area: 83.32 m^{2} (896.8 sq ft) swept
- Propellers: 2-bladed, 1.90 m (6 ft 3 in) diameter fixed pitch, pusher configuration

Performance

- Maximum speed: 210 km/h (130 mph, 110 kn)
- Cruise speed: 180 km/h (110 mph, 97 kn)
- Stall speed: 40 km/h (25 mph, 22 kn) minimum speed in level flight
- Range: 620 km (390 mi, 330 nmi)
- Endurance: 3h 30min
- Service ceiling: 3,000 m (9,800 ft)
- Rate of climb: 5 m/s (980 ft/min)
- Disk loading: 12.36 kg/m^{2} (2.53 lb/sq ft) maximum
