= Operation Southern Watch =

1992–2003 U.S. military operation in southern Iraq

- Part of the Iraqi no-fly zones conflict
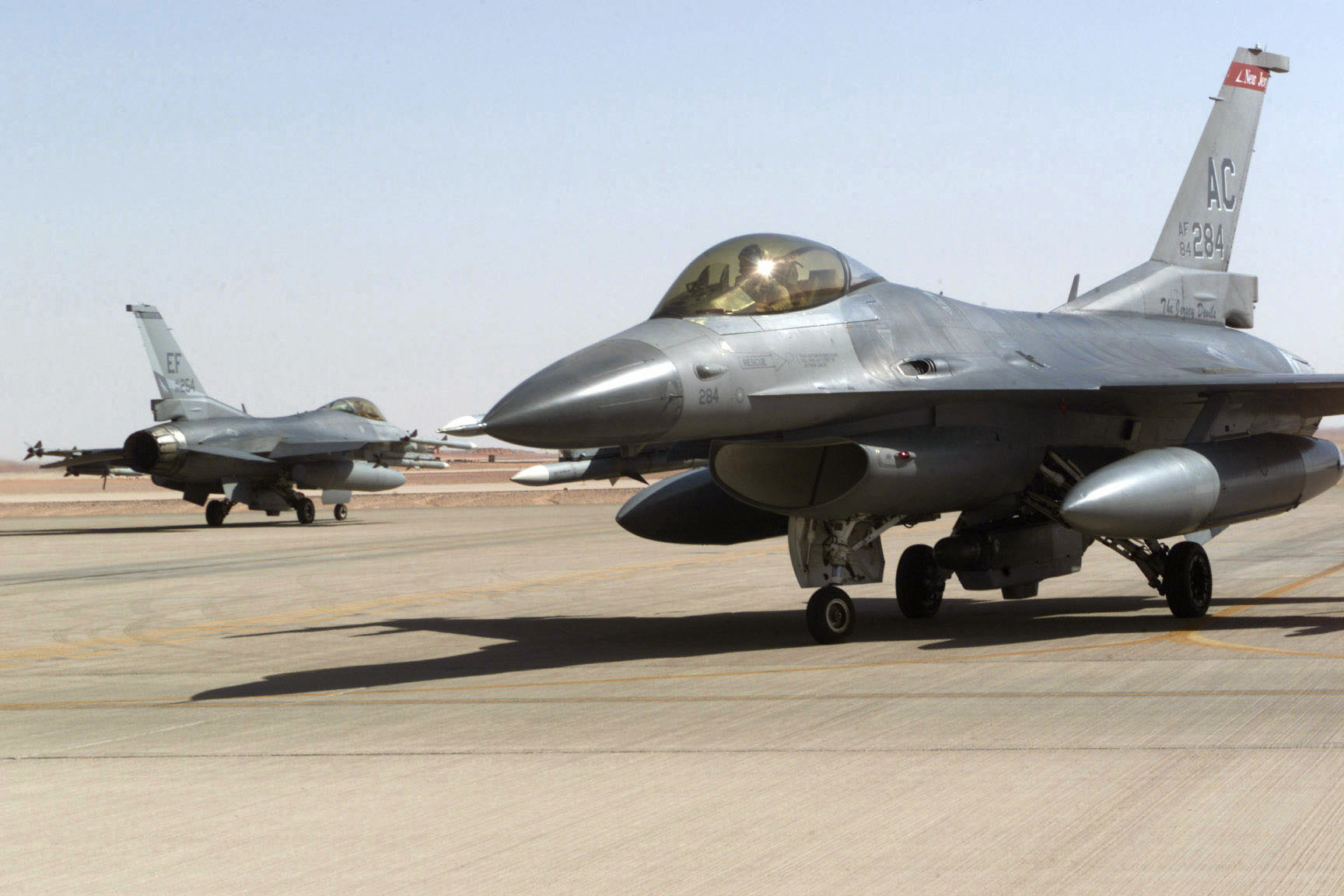
- Two F-16 Fighting Falcon aircraft from the Texas Air National Guard and New Jersey Air National Guard prepare to depart Prince Sultan Air Base on a patrol as part of Operation Southern Watch in 2000.
Date	26 August 1992 – 20 March 2003
Location	Southern Iraq, below the 32nd and 33rd parallels.
Result	Inconclusive

Belligerents
United States; United Kingdom; France (until 1998); Saudi Arabia	Iraq

Commanders and leaders
(United States) George H. W. Bush (United States) Bill Clinton (United States) George W. Bush	(Iraq) Saddam Hussein

Strength
5,000	Various Iraqi air defense forces

Casualties and losses
19 American airmen killed and 372 coalition personnel injured in the Khobar Towers bombing 3 RQ-1 Predator shot down	1 MiG-25 Foxbat and 1 MiG-23 Flogger shot down 10–15 air defense systems destroyed 175+ civilians killed and 500 others wounded

Operation Southern Watch was an air-centric military operation conducted by the United States Department of Defense from August 1992 to March 2003.

United States Central Command's Joint Task Force Southwest Asia (JTF-SWA) had the mission of monitoring and controlling the airspace south of the 32nd Parallel (extended to the 33rd Parallel in 1996) in southern and south-central Iraq during the period following the end of the 1991 Persian Gulf War until the 2003 invasion of Iraq.

== Summary ==
Operation Southern Watch began on 27 August 1992 with the stated purpose of ensuring Iraqi compliance with United Nations Security Council Resolution 688 (UNSCR 688) of 5 April 1991, which demanded that Iraq, "immediately end this repression and express the hope in the same context that an open dialogue will take place to ensure that the human and political rights of all Iraqi citizens are respected." Nothing in the resolution spelled out the Iraqi no-fly zones or Operation Southern Watch.

Following the end of the Gulf War in March 1991, the Iraqi Air Force bombed and strafed the Shi'ite Muslims in Southern Iraq during the remainder of 1991 and into 1992. The U.S. and UK deemed that Iraqi president Saddam Hussein was choosing not to comply with the resolution. Military forces from Saudi Arabia, the United States, the United Kingdom, and France participated in Operation Southern Watch. The commander of JTF-SWA, an aeronautically rated United States Air Force (USAF) Major General, assisted by an aeronautically designated United States Navy (USN) Rear Admiral, along with a battle staff, were initially headquartered at the Eskan Village U.S. military compound on the outskirts of Riyadh, Saudi Arabia, and reported directly to the Commander, United States Central Command (USCENTCOM) at MacDill AFB, Florida. In the summer of 2001, JTF-SWA relocated to Prince Sultan Air Base and a purpose-built Combined Air Operations Center (CAOC).

Military engagements in Southern Watch occurred with regularity, with Coalition aircraft routinely being shot at by Iraqi air defense forces utilizing surface-to-air missiles (SAMs) and anti-aircraft artillery (AAA), although such incidents were usually only reported in the Western press occasionally. An intensification was noted prior to the 2003 invasion of Iraq, though it was said at the time to just be in response to increasing activity by Iraqi air-defense forces. It is now known that this increased activity occurred during an operation known as Operation Southern Focus.

== Military operations ==
=== Immediate postwar ===
At first, Iraqi forces did not attack Coalition aircraft. However, after the United Nations voted to maintain sanctions against Iraq, Iraqi forces began to fire on the aircraft and USAF E-3 Sentry AEW&C aircraft reported an unusual amount of Iraqi Air Force activity.

On 27 December 1992, a lone Iraqi MiG-25 Foxbat crossed into the no-fly zone and flew towards a flight of USAF F-15C Eagles before turning north and using its superior speed to outrun the pursuing Eagles. Later in the day, several Iraqi fighters dodged back and forth across the 32nd parallel, staying out of missile range of American fighters. However, an Iraqi MiG-25 crossed too far and was trapped inside the 32nd parallel by a flight of USAF F-16C Fighting Falcons of the 33rd Fighter Squadron. After intelligence verified the aircraft was hostile, the fighter pilot received clearance to fire. The lead plane piloted by then-Lieutenant Colonel (later General) Gary North, USAF, fired an AIM-120 AMRAAM missile which destroyed the Iraqi fighter. This was the first combat kill by an F-16 in USAF service, and the first combat kill using the AMRAAM missile. On 17 January 1993, a USAF F-16C destroyed an Iraqi MiG-23 Flogger with an AMRAAM missile for the second USAF aerial victory.

On 7 January 1993, Iraq agreed to American, British, and French demands to withdraw their surface-to-air missiles from below the 32nd parallel. However, they did not remove all of them, and U.S. President George H. W. Bush ordered U.S. aircraft to bomb the remaining missile sites. On 13 January, more than 100 American, British, and French aircraft attacked Iraqi missile sites near Nasiriyah, Samawah, Najaf, and Al-Amarah. Around half the Iraqi sites south of the 32nd parallel were hit. On 29 June, a USAF F-4G Phantom II destroyed an Iraqi radar which had illuminated it, and a month later, two U.S. Navy EA-6B Prowlers fired AGM-88 HARM missiles at more Iraqi radars.

=== Operations "Vigilant Warrior" and "Desert Strike" ===
The first nine months of 1994 were quiet, and the USAF began to withdraw forces from the region. In October, Saddam deployed two divisions of Iraqi Republican Guard troops to the Kuwaiti border after demanding that UN sanctions were to be lifted, precipitating Operation Vigilant Warrior, the rushing of American troops to the Persian Gulf region. Saddam later withdrew the Iraqi Republican Guard out of the Kuwaiti border due to massive American military buildup. This served to increase Coalition resolve to enforce the no-fly zones.

On 25 June 1996, terrorists bombed the U.S. base at Khobar Towers in Dhahran, Saudi Arabia which housed personnel at King Abdulaziz Air Base supporting Operation Southern Watch. The attack killed 2 USAF officers, 17 USAF enlisted airmen, and injured an additional 372 people. This event led to a re-alignment of American forces in Saudi Arabia from Khobar Towers to Prince Sultan Air Base and Eskan Village, with both installations located away from population centers.

In August 1996, Iraqi forces invaded the Kurdish regions of northern Iraq and American forces responded with Operation Desert Strike against targets in southern Iraq. As a result, the no-fly zone was extended north to the 33rd parallel. This marked renewed conflict with Iraqi air defenses and several more radars were destroyed by F-16 fighters.

=== Operation "Desert Fox" ===
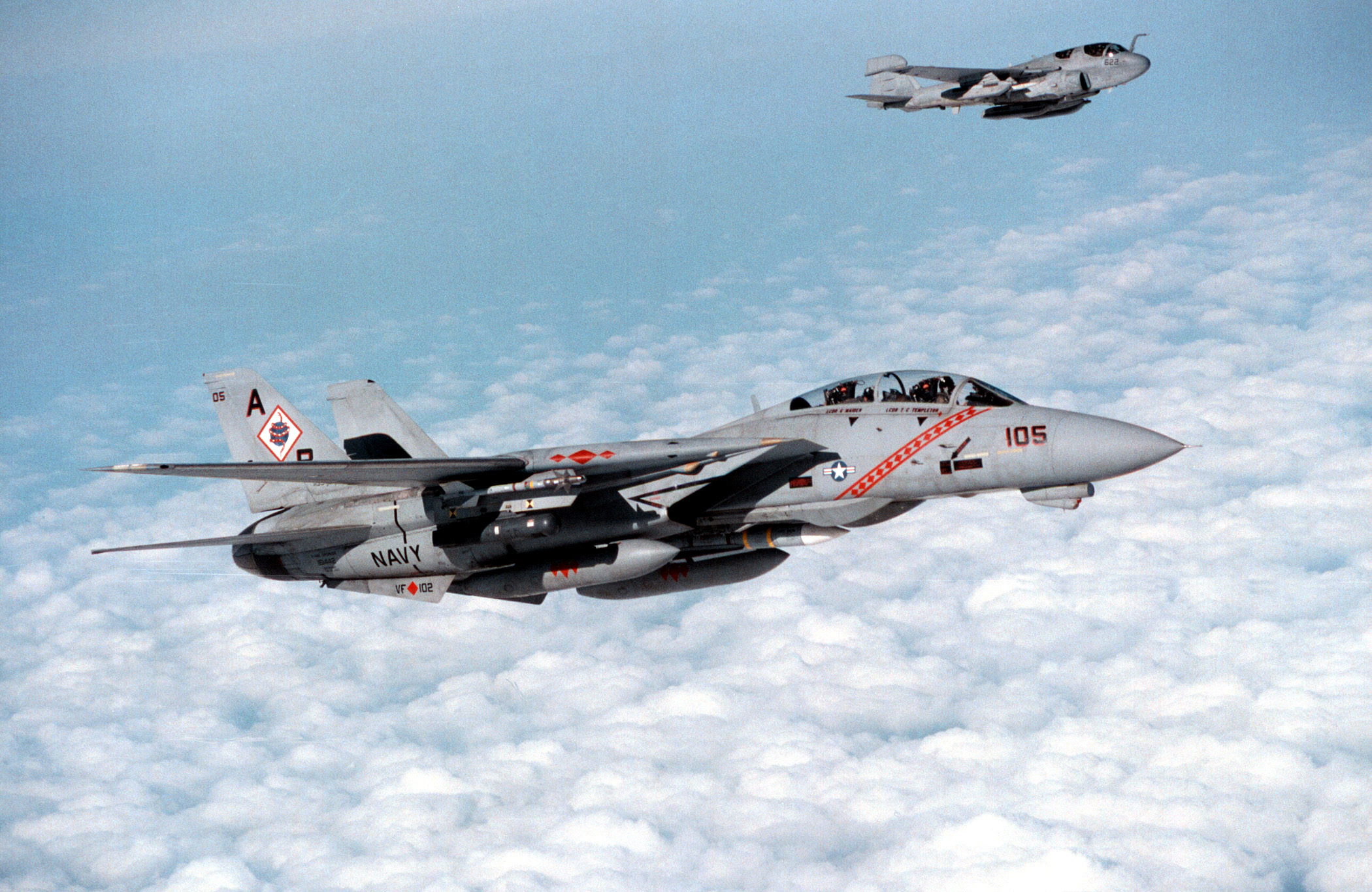
Two US Navy aircraft – an F-14B Tomcat of VF-102 (foreground) and an EA-6B Prowler of VAQ-137 – over Iraq during January 1998

On 15 December 1998, France suspended participation in the no-fly zones, arguing that they had been maintained for too long and were ineffective. On 16 December, U.S. President Bill Clinton ordered execution of Operation Desert Fox, a four-day air campaign against targets all over Iraq, citing Iraq's failure to comply with UNSC Resolutions. This resulted in an increased level of combat in the no-fly zones which lasted until 2003.

=== Last years ===
On 30 December 1998, Iraqi SA-6 missile sites fired 6 to 8 surface-to-air missiles at American military aircraft. USAF F-16s responded by bombing the sites.

On 5 January 1999, four Iraqi MiG-25s crossed into the southern no-fly zone, sparking aerial combat with two USAF F-15 Eagles and two USN F-14 Tomcats. The American fighters fired a total of six missiles at the Iraqi aircraft, but the Iraqi aircraft were able to evade all of the missiles and escape back to the north.

On 22 May 2000, it was reported that since execution of Operation Desert Fox in December 1998, there had been 470 separate incidents of AAA or surface-to-air missile fire at Coalition aircraft, while at the same time, Iraqi aircraft had violated the southern no-fly zone 150 times. Over the same time period, American aircraft had attacked Iraqi targets on 73 occasions.

On 16 February 2001, American and British aircraft launched attacks against six targets in southern Iraq, including command centers, radars and communications centers. Only about 40% of the targets were hit. This operation sparked scathing editorials in the foreign press, which reflected growing world skepticism about American-British policy towards Iraq. Incidents of Coalition planes coming under fire, followed by retaliatory air strikes began to happen on a weekly basis.

In late 2001, a Sudanese man with links to al-Qaeda fired a man-portable SA-7 Strela missile at a USAF F-15C Eagle fighter taking off from Prince Sultan Air Base in Saudi Arabia. The missile missed the target and was not detected by the pilot or anyone at the base. Saudi Police found the empty launcher in the desert in May 2002, and a suspect was arrested in Sudan a month later. He led police to a cache in the desert where a second missile was buried.

In June 2002, American and British forces stepped up attacks on Iraqi air defense targets all over southern Iraq. It was later revealed that this was part of a pre-planned operation called Southern Focus which had the goal of degrading the Iraqi air-defense system in preparation for the planned invasion of Iraq.

From August 1992 to early 2001, Coalition pilots had flown 153,000 sorties over southern Iraq.

From 1992 to 2003, various Coalition naval assets also supported maritime interdiction operations in the Persian Gulf under the banners of Operation Southern Watch and Operation Northern Watch.

== Basing and withdrawal ==
Until late February 2003, all USAF, USN, USMC, RAF, and French Air Force aircraft rotationally based in Saudi Arabia had been "defensive" assets to defend Saudi Arabia. They carried no "offensive" air-to-ground ordnance, only air-to-air missiles, 20 mm cannon rounds, and AGM-88 HARM missiles (only by USAF F-16CJs and USN/USMC EA-6Bs) as defense against Iraqi surface-to-air missiles.

As a result, strike aircraft with "offensive" ordnance were limited to USAF A-10 Thunderbolt II, F-15E Strike Eagle, F-16C, RAF Tornado GR4, and occasionally USMC F/A-18 Hornet or AV-8B Harrier aircraft based at Ali Al Salem Air Base and Ahmad al-Jaber Air Base in Kuwait, and USN and USMC F-14, F/A-18 and EA-6B aircraft aboard U.S. Navy aircraft carriers and USMC AV-8B aircraft aboard U.S. amphibious assault ships operating in the Arabian Gulf.

In addition to USN E-2 Hawkeye airborne early warning aircraft flying from aircraft carriers and USAF E-3 AWACS and E-8 J-STARS command & control aircraft and KC-135 Stratotanker air refueling aircraft based in Saudi Arabia, additional USAF KC-10 Extender and KC-135 air refueling aircraft were also based at Al Dhafra Air Base in the UAE, while RAF VC10 K3 refuelers were based alongside USN P-3 Orion and EP-3 Aries aircraft at the U.S. Navy's Aviation Support Unit (ASU) at Bahrain International Airport in Bahrain to support these strike aircraft.

In the 2003 Operation Iraqi Freedom, Saudi Arabia did not allow offensive air combat operations to be launched from its territory or airspace. As a result, it imposed takeoff and refueling restrictions to prevent U.S.-led Coalition warplanes stationed on its airfields from conducting offensive combat operations against Iraq.

During the Iraq war, although U.S.-led Coalition forces obtained access in the UAE and Bahrain through facilities or overflight permissions, the U.S. and other Coalition forces did not feel the need to launch attacks from these countries. This was due to the experience they had in the 1998 Operation Desert Fox, when the UAE and Bahrain, like Saudi Arabia, had not allowed air strikes to be launched from their own airfields.

Because of these restrictions, during the initial major air campaign phase of Operation Iraqi Freedom (OIF), U.S.-led Coalition forces conducted offensive air combat operations against Iraq using warplanes and missiles launched from airfields in Kuwait, Qatar, Jordan, and Oman, as well as from aircraft carriers and cruisers deployed in the Eastern Mediterranean, the Red Sea, and the Arabian Gulf.

In February 2003, Saudi Arabia partially relaxed its restriction on “offensive” air-to-ground munitions for the United States. However, the USAF F-16CJs aircraft that would use the permitted munitions in the war could only carry out defensive missions when operating from Saudi territory.

These missions consisted of escort SEAD (Suppression of enemy air defenses) and on-call DEAD (Destruction of enemy air defenses) missions against threats from Iraqi SAM's (surface-to-air missile systems), AAA's (anti-aircraft artilleries), and radar emissions to other U.S.-led Coalition aircraft, as well as on-call reactive, emergency, and time-sensitive CAS (Close Air Support) missions against the Iraqi Army threatening U.S.-led Coalition ground forces on the ground.

The U.S.-led Coalition air-to-air fighter jets stationed at Saudi airfields, namely USAF F-15Cs and RAF Tornado F3s, were likewise restricted to carrying out only DCA (defensive counter-air) missions.

The enforcement of the no-fly zone over southern Iraq and the major combat operations against the Saddam regime effectively came to an end in mid-April 2003 following the fall of Baghdad and subsequently the fall of Tikrit.

As a result, the United States relocated the Combined Air Operations Center (CAOC) located at Prince Sultan Air Base to a backup facility in Qatar on April 28. This transfer process was announced in a press statement following a meeting on April 29, 2003, by former Saudi Defense Minister Prince Sultan bin Abdulaziz and former U.S. Secretary of Defense Donald Rumsfeld.

All personnel at the air base—except for aircraft belonging to the Royal Saudi Air Force (RSAF)—as well as all combat troops, were fully transferred by the end of August 2003 to locations such as Al Udeid Air Base in Qatar and Al Dhafra Air Base in the United Arab Emirates.

== See also ==
- Operation Northern Watch
