= Iraqi Air Defence Command =

- قيادة الدفاع الجوي العراقي
- Emblem of the Air Defence
- Founded: 1 February 1993; 33 years ago
- Country: Iraq
- Type: Air Defence
- Size: 24,000 personnel (2025)
- Part of: Iraqi Armed Forces
- Headquarters: Baghdad
- March: March of the Air Defence
- Engagements: Invasion of Kuwait; Gulf War; 1991 uprisings in Iraq; Iraqi no-fly zones; Iraq War; War against the Islamic State; Syrian Civil War; Iran–Saudi Arabia proxy conflict; Iran–Israel proxy conflict; Twelve-Day War

Commanders
- Current commander: Lt. Gen. Muhannad Ghalib al-Asadi

The Iraqi Air Defence Command (Arabic: قيادة الدِفَاع الجَوِّي) is the aerial defense branch of the Iraqi Armed Forces. It is one of the key service components under the authority of the Iraqi Ministry of Defense, responsible for the protection of Iraq’s airspace and critical infrastructure from aerial threats. The current commander is Lt. Gen. Muhannad Ghalib al-Asadi.

Headquartered in Baghdad, the Iraqi Air Defense Forces oversee a network of radar sites, surface-to-air missile (SAM) systems, and anti-aircraft artillery units across the country. In recent years, Iraq has undertaken efforts to modernize its air defense capabilities, integrating legacy Soviet-era systems with newer platforms acquired through international partnerships.

Historically, the Iraqi Air Defense Command played a significant role during conflicts such as the Iran–Iraq War, the Gulf War, and the 2003 Iraq War. In the post-2003 period, the command has been in a process of rebuilding and restructuring, with a current estimated strength of approximately 24,000 personnel as of 2025.

== History ==
Before 1993 a considerable anti-aircraft gun and missile force had been built up, but not under a separate command. After the 2003 invasion of Iraq and the dissolution of all Iraqi Armed Forces it was reformed in 2011. In 2023 the commander was Lieutenant General Maan al-Saadi.

Iraqi air defence began with the purchase of 20-mm and 40-mm anti-aircraft guns for the Iraqi Army, and each of its divisions had an anti-aircraft battalion by the 1950s. Thereafter the force saw continual growth. But after the Israelis destroyed the atomic reactor at the Tuwaitha Nuclear Research Center in 1981 through the air raid Operation Opera, the defences were extensively redesigned. A network of radars, surface-to-air missiles and anti-aircraft guns were installed, centered on the strategic and industrial facilities of Baghdad.

In 1988 the Air Defence Command had about 10,000 personnel.

After the Gulf War of 1991, the force became a separate service in 1993.

By 2002 the IADC had four air defence sectors and at least five missile brigades, the 145th, 146th, 147th, 148th, and 195th. It was commanded by General Yassin Mohammed Shaheen, who had been deputy air defence commander during the 1991 Gulf War, and had an estimated strength of about 17,000. The ADC HQ, part of which was underground, was close to Muthenna Air Base in the Mansour area of Baghdad. The four regional SOCs co-ordinated SAM and anti-aircraft gun batteries. The longer-range SAMs consist primarily of the SA-2 and SA-3, with the SA-6 fulfilling a mobile, medium-range role. Jane's reported in May 2002 that other equipment includes Roland SAMs, anti-aircraft guns, and a mix of Western and Soviet-designed radar.

The air defence system consisted of the National Air Defence Operations Center in Baghdad and four air defence sectors:

- Central Region Air Defence Sector, with an operations center in Taji and operations centers in Taji, Taqaddam, Salman Pak, Kut, Najaf and Nukhib.
- Western Air Defence Sector, with its headquarters close to H3 airfield
- Southern Air Defence Sector
- Northern Air Defence Sector, headquarters Al-Hurriya Air Base close to Kirkuk

Each sector had missile brigades; anti-aircraft artillery; and early warning radar units.

== New equipments ==
In recent years, Iraq has focused on enhancing its air defense through international collaborations and acquisitions:

- Radar Systems: In 2022, Iraq inaugurated its first Thales Ground Master 403 (GM403) long-range radar system, marking a significant step in airspace surveillance. The GM403 radar provides 3D air surveillance capabilities with a range of up to 470 km. Plans include integrating these radars with existing systems like the U.S.-made AN/TPS-77 to establish a comprehensive air surveillance network.
- Command and Control: A new Air Defense Command Operations Center is under construction to coordinate the nation’s air defense assets effectively. This center aims to integrate various radar and missile systems, enhancing real-time threat assessment and response.
- Personnel Training: Collaborations with international partners include training programs to develop Iraqi expertise in operating and maintaining advanced air defense systems, ensuring long-term self-sufficiency.

== Status in 2025 ==
As of 2025, the Iraqi Air Defense Command (IADC) has undergone significant restructuring and modernization efforts to enhance its capabilities in safeguarding the nation’s airspace. The IADC now operates under a centralized command structure, integrating various air defense systems and radar installations across the country.

The IADC’s organizational structure comprises multiple specialized units, including:

- Surface-to-Air Missile (SAM) Battalions:
- One battalion equipped with Russian Pantsir-S1 systems, providing short to medium-range air defense capabilities.
- Another battalion operating American AN/TWQ-1 Avenger systems, offering mobile short-range air defense.
- A third battalion utilizing upgraded Soviet Igla-S systems for man-portable air defense.
- Radar and Surveillance Units:
- Deployment of Thales Ground Master 403 (GM403) long-range 3D radars, enhancing early warning and airspace monitoring capabilities.

In addition to existing systems, Iraq has entered into agreements to acquire advanced air defense technologies:

- Cheongung II (KM-SAM) Systems:
- In September 2024, Iraq signed a $2.8 billion deal with South Korea’s LIG Nex1 to procure eight batteries of the Cheongung II medium-range surface-to-air missile systems, aiming to bolster its air defense coverage.

The IADC’s modernization efforts reflect Iraq’s commitment to enhancing its air defense capabilities amid evolving regional security challenges.

== See also ==
- Iraqi Air Force
