= Abd al-Sattar =

ʻAbd al-Sattār (ALA-LC romanization of Arabic: عبد الستّار) is an Arabic Muslim male given name, built on the Arabic words ʻabd and al-Sattār. The name means "servant of the Veiler (of sins)".

Because the letter s is a sun letter, the letter l of the al- is usually assimilated to it. Thus although the name is written with letters corresponding to Abd al-Sattar, the usual pronunciation corresponds to Abd as-Sattar. Alternative transliterations include Abdus Sattar, Abdul Sattar, Abdel Sattar and others, all subject to variant spacing and hyphenation.

It may refer to:

== Politicians ==
- Abdus Sattar (president) (1906–1985), Bangladeshi jurist and politician who served as president of Bangladesh, November 1981 to March 1982
- Abdul Sattar (diplomat) (1931–2019), Foreign Minister of Pakistan 1993 and 1999–2002
- Abdul Sattar (Pakistani senator), member of the Senate of Pakistan
- Abdus Sattar (Comilla politician), a Bangladeshi Awami League politician from Comilla-21
- Abdus Sattar (Jamalpur politician)
- Abdus Sattar (Jhenaidah politician)
- Abdus Sattar (Lakshmipur politician)
- Abdul Sattar (Maharashtra politician)
- Abdus Sattar (Murshidabad politician) (1925–1991), Indian National Congress politician
- Abdus Sattar (Tangail politician), a Bangladeshi politician and former member of parliament from Tangail-1
- Abdus Sattar (West Bengal politician), Communist Party of India (Marxist) 21st century politician
- Abdul Sattar Afghani (1930–2006), Pakistani politician
- Abdul Satar Sirat (born 1937), Afghan politician
- Abdul Sattar Murad (b. 1958), Afghan politician, governor of Kapisa province 2004–07
- Abdul Sattar Khan (politician) (b. 1975), a Pakistani politician
- Abdul Sattar Abdul Nabi, a Maharashtra politician representing Sillod constituency
- Abdel-Sattar Abdel-Jabbar, Iraqi political activist in 2004
- A. B. M. Abdus Sattar, Bangladesh Nationalist Party politician
- Abdus Sattar (Nilphamari politician), Bangladeshi politician
- Abdus Sattar (Mymensingh politician), Bangladeshi politician

== Other people ==
- Abd al-Sattar al-Aboussi (1930–1970) perpetrator behind the killing of the Iraqi Royal Family
- Abd al-Sattar Qasim
- Maulānā Abdul Sattar Khān Niazī (1915–2001), Pakistani religious and political leader
- Mohammad Abdus Sattar (1925–2011), Indian footballer
- Abdus Sattar (1920–19??), Indian footballer who played for Mohammedan Sporting in the 1930s
- Abdus Sattar (1925–2009), Bangladeshi industrialist and politician
- Abdul Sattar Edhi (1928–2016), Pakistani philanthropist
- Abdus Suttar Khan (1941–2008), Bangladeshi aerospace researcher
- Abdul Sattar Jawad (born 1943), Iraqi-American professor of English
- Ibrahim Ahmad Abd al-Sattar Muhammad (1956–2010), chief of staff of the Iraqi armed forces before the 2003 invasion
- Abdul Sattar Abu Risha (1972–2007), Iraqi Sunni tribal leader and ally of the U.S.
- Abdel Sattar Sabry (born 1974), Egyptian footballer
- Abdul Sattar (Guantanamo detainee 10) (born 1981), Pakistani prisoner in Guantanamo
- Abdul Sattar Bhagat (active 1970), Pakistani cricketer
- Zuhayr Talib Abd al-Sattar al-Naqib, director of military intelligence in Iraq before the 2003 invasion
- Abdussattar Shaikh, FBI informant 1994–2003
- Abdul-Satar al-Bahadli (fl. 2004), Iraqi Shi'a cleric
- Nodirbek Abdusattorov, chess grandmaster from Uzbekistan

== See also ==
- Sattar
