= Iraq–Somalia relations =

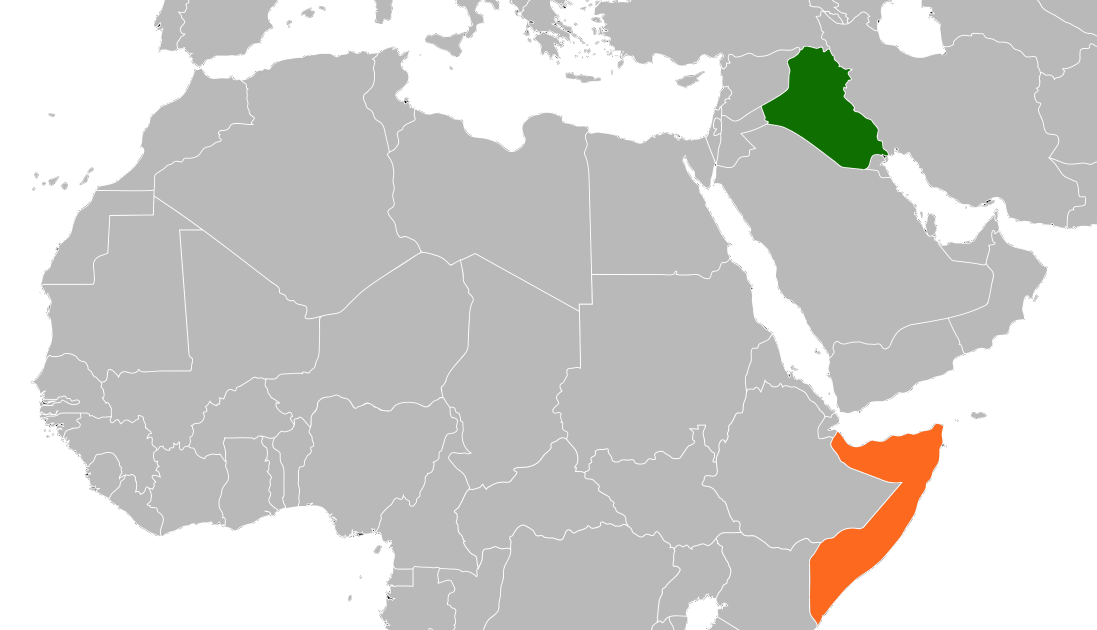
- Iraq: Somalia

Iraq–Somalia relations refer to foreign relations between Iraq and Somalia. Both nations are Arab League & Organisation of Islamic Cooperation members and maintain relations.

== History ==
Diplomatic relations between Iraq and Somalia was established on 17 October 1966. Like other neighbouring nations, both nations underwent socialist military coups in the late 1960s, Iraq's 17 July Revolution in 1968 and Somalia's 1969 coup d'état. This provided Ba'athist Iraq and the Somali Democratic Republic opportunities to collaborate in technical, military and economic affairs. Up until the collapse of their respective governments, Iraq and Somalia maintained a special relationship. In Somalia, there are numerous towns and villages named after things and places from Iraq, i.e. Baqdaad, Middle Shabelle.

Iraq was one of Somalia's top trading partners and Iraq invested and constructed energy infrastructure within Somalia. Iraq also provided scholarships for Somali students to study at Iraqi universities as it did for other Arab states. Somalia would also sell armaments & components to Iraq to bolster Iraq's domestic military industry. Additionally, Somalia is heavily suspected to be a major source of fissile material in Iraqi attempts to construct a nuclear weapon. In fact, despite not having a functioning government at the time, the United States Intelligence Community's National Intelligence Estimate of 2002 stated that Somalia was one of the suspected nations to be a source of yellowcake uranium.

In 1973, Somalia strongly supported the Arab coalition of the Yom Kippur War in which Iraq was a major participant.

In 1977, the Ogaden War broke out, Iraq was staunchly pro-Somalia, sending infantry, military intelligence officers and even sent the expeditionary No. 11 Squadron, Iraqi Air Force led by then-Colonel Hakam Hassan in support of the Somali Air Force. Furthermore, Iraq refused to let Soviet Air Force fighters to refuel in Iraq and not allow them to use Iraqi airspace for the Soviet intervention in the war. Iraq's friction with the Soviet Union surrounding other issues allowed Iraq to grow closer to Somalia.

In 1980, Iraq invaded Iran and the subsequent Iran–Iraq War occurs, with Iranian attacks on Iraqi oil installations throughout the 1980s, Iraq is unable to provide Somalia with investments and with Somalia's then tense relationships with both the United States and Soviet Union, Somalia enters a period of sharp decline.

Somalia was strongly and deeply against the 2003 invasion and subsequent Iraq War. Notably, there were major anti-war protests in Mogadishu in support of Iraq.

== Diplomatic missions ==
Somalia has an embassy in Baghdad, and Iraq is slated to reopen its embassy in Mogadishu. The current Somali ambassador to Iraq is Dr. Liban Sheikh Mahmood and Iraq currently maintains a non-resident embassy in Nairobi.
