= Abdul Sattar Khan =

Abdul Sattar Khan may refer to:

- Abdul Sattar Khan (producer)
- Abdul Sattar Khan (politician)
- Abdus Suttar Khan (c. 1941–2008), Bangladeshi scientist
