= Othman al-Ghanmi =

Iraqi politician

General Othman al-Ghanmi
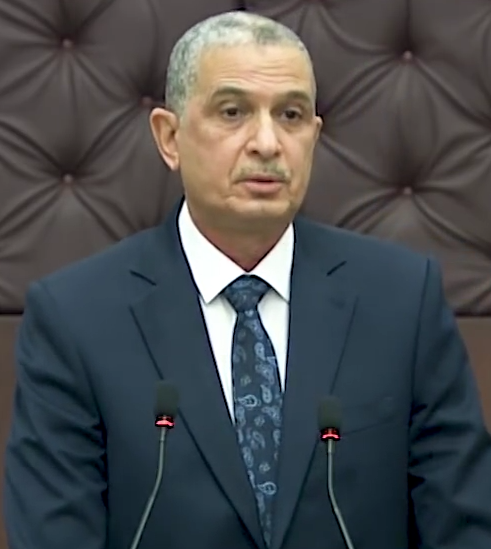
- Portrait of Othman al-Ghanmi

Minister of the Interior
- In office 7 May 2020 – 27 October 2022
- Preceded by: Yasin Tahir al-Yaseri
- Succeeded by: Abdul Amir al-Shammari

Chief of the General Staff of the Iraqi Armed Forces
- In office 2015–2020
- Preceded by: Babaker Zebari
- Succeeded by: Abdul Amir Yarallah

Personal details
- Born: Othman Ali Farhoud Mushir Al-Ghanimi, 1958 (age 67–68) Sumer, Qadisiyah, Iraq

Military service
- Allegiance: Iraq
- Branch/service: Iraqi Army
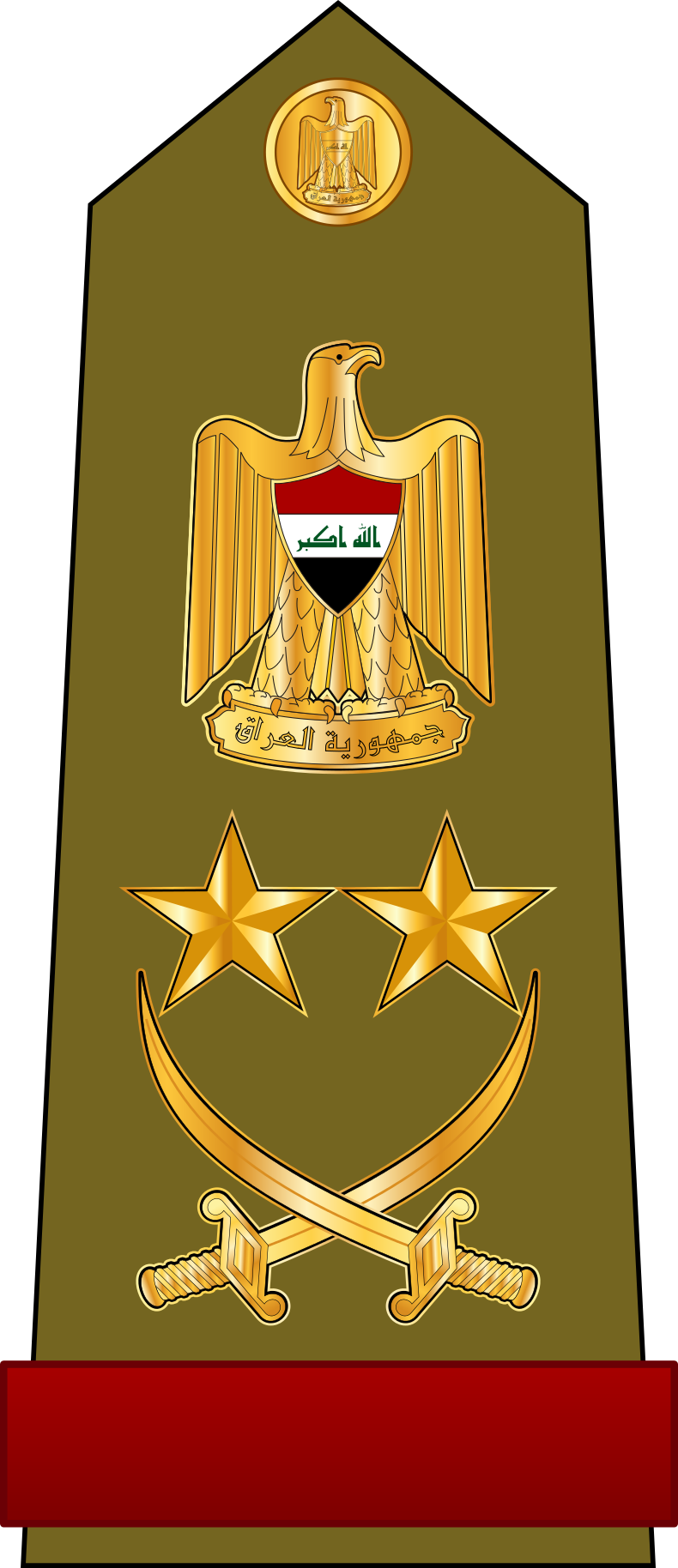
- Rank: General
- Commands: Chief of Staff of the Iraqi Armed Forces

Othman al-Ghanmi (Arabic: عثمان الغانمي; born 1958) is a former Iraqi army general who served as the chief of staff of the Iraqi Armed Forces during 2015–2020. He was the minister of interior during 2020–2022. On 27 July 2019, he received the Legion of Merit from the United States Armed Forces and became the first Republic of Iraq citizen to receive the award.

== Early life ==
Al-Ghanimi was born in 1958 in Sumer, Al-Qadisiyyah Governorate, into a Shia Muslim family.

== Career ==
In 2014 he was appointed deputy chief of staff, having formerly led the Mid Euphrates Command.
