= Farhan Jubouri =

Former Iraqi Intelligence Officer

Farhan Mutlaq Saleh al-Jubouri
- فرحان مطلك صالح الجبوري
- Born: Farhan Mutlaq Saleh al-Jubouri; 1940s Qayyarah, Nineveh Governorate, Iraq
- Died: 26 or 28 March 2013 (aged 67); Al-Kadhimiya prison, Baghdad, Iraq
- Burial place: Qayyarah, Nineveh Governorate, Iraq
- Military career
- Allegiance: Iraq
- Service: Iraqi Army / General Military Intelligence
- Rank: Major general
- Unit: General Military Intelligence
- Commands: Head of General Military Intelligence in northern Iraq
- Known for: Role in Al-Anfal campaign; defence witness for “Chemical Ali”
- Conflicts: Al-Anfal campaign
- Other work: Defence witness for “Chemical Ali”

Farhan Mutlaq Saleh al-Jubouri (Arabic: فرحان مطلك صالح الجبوري) was an Iraqi intelligence officer who served as the head of General Military Intelligence in northern Iraq during the al-Anfal campaign. He was born in the 1940s.

== Military career ==
He served as Head of General Military Intelligence in northern Iraq during the al-Anfal campaign which Sweden, Norway and the United Kingdom officially recognize as genocide. He attained the rank of Maj. General.

== Iraqi Special Tribunal ==
Following the 2003 invasion of Iraq Jubouri was charged by the Iraqi Special Tribunal for war crimes and crimes against humanity committed during the al-Anfal campaign. According to Bassem Mroue writing in The Washington Post on 29 January 2007, Jubouri is rerecorded as saying "People hear that Fahran al-Jubouri ordered executions, that villages were destroyed and that he was behind mass graves. My reputation is ruined. I am innocent of all charges against me". The trial concluded on 24 March 2007, with Jubouri being found guilty and given a life sentence. He appealed his sentence, although it was confirmed in a subsequent verdict.

Jubouri was a defence witness for Ali Hassan al-Majid, also known as "Chemical Ali".

== Death ==
Jubouri died in Al- Kadhimiya prison in Baghdad on 26 or 28 March 2013 at the age of 67. He had been suffering from a chronic illness. He was buried on 1 April in his hometown of Qayyarah in Nineveh Governorate.
