= Wafiq al-Samarrai =

Iraqi general (1947–2022)

- وفيق عجيل حمود السامرائيّ
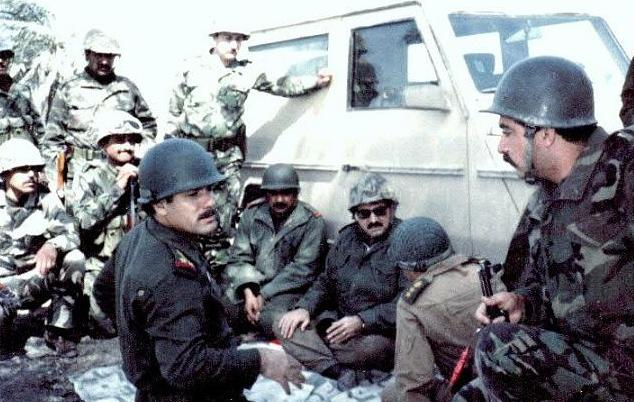
- Samarrai (centre left) during the Iran Iraq War.

National Security Adviser
- In office 2005–2008
- President: Jalal Talabani

Director of General Military Intelligence
- In office 1990–1991
- President: Saddam Hussein
- Preceded by: Saber Abdel Aziz al-Douri

Personal details
- Born: 1 July 1947 Samarra, Kingdom of Iraq
- Died: 29 August 2022 (aged 75) London, United Kingdom

Military service
- Allegiance: Iraq (1968–1994); INC (1994–2003)
- Branch/service: Iraqi Ground Forces
- Years of service: 1968–1994
- Rank: Colonel General
- Battles/wars: Iran–Iraq War

Wafiq Ajeel Homood al-Samarrai (Arabic: وفيق عجيل حمود السامرائي; 1 July 1947 – 29 August 2022), better known as Wafiq al-Samarrai, was an Iraqi military officer and intelligence chief who served as Iraq's chief of general military intelligence during Saddam Hussein's era.

== Military career ==
Al-Samarrai served as the deputy of the Military Intelligence Director in 1988 during the Anfal Campaign, in the Iraqi Intelligence during the Iran–Iraq War and was appointed head of Military Intelligence Agency in 1990.

== Defection ==
He defected in December 1994 and drove up to Kirkuk, then walked for 30 hours to cross the frontier into the Northern Kurdish enclave. At first he allied himself with Ahmad Chalabi, the leader of the Iraqi National Congress. They fomented a mini war in March 1995 between Kurdish groups and the Iraqi Army that went wrong when the insurgents failed to secure American military air support. Al-Samarrai moved to Syria and eventually made his way to London in 1998, where he headed an opposition group called the Higher Council for National Salvation which is based in Denmark.

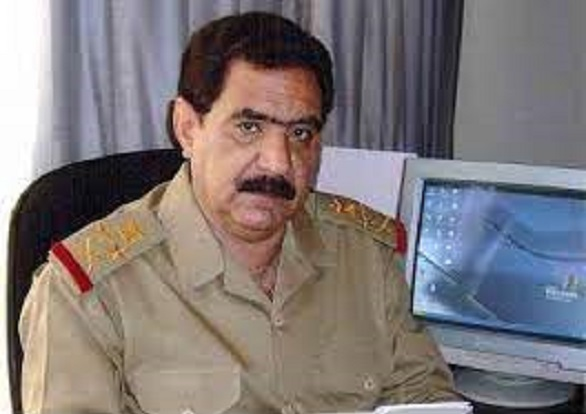
Wafiq, after his defection.

Following his defection, Qusay Hussein told senior Iraqi officials, including Ra'ad al-Hamdani, that al-Samarrai had been an undercover agent for Jalal Talabani and Iran since 1982. Former Maj. Gen. Mizher Rashid al-Tarfa al-Ubaydi of Iraqi Intelligence claimed that al-Samarrai fled because he believed he was about to be arrested.

== Book ==
- The destruction of the eastern gate

== Post invasion of Iraq ==
In 2003, he returned to his hometown Samarra, Iraq and remained there until he was appointed the national security advisor to President Jalal Talabani in 2005 and moved to the Green Zone in Baghdad. He was relieved of his post in 2008 after the discovery of documents implicating him in the Iraqi forces' operations against rebels in the 1991 uprisings.

On 6 March 2008, the Iraqi presidency website publicized a judicial decision to lift off all restrictions imposed on General Wafiq al-Samarrai, including a freeze on his assets, after Supreme Criminal Court Judge Adnan Al Badri reportedly announced that a probe found no evidence implicating al-Samarrai in 1991 Iraqi Army attacks on Kurds and Shias. However, Samarrai left for London and announced that he will not return to Iraq in the future.

On 29 August 2022, he died in London, a year after he had been admitted to hospitals there, while suffering from cancer.
