= Osman Ahmed (artist) =

Kurdish-British artist from Iraq (born 1962)

- Born: 1962 (age 63–64); Sulaymaniyah, Iraq
- Citizenship: British
- Occupation: Artist
- Notable work: Drawings of the Anfal genocide

Dr Osman Ahmed (Sorani Kurdish: عوسمان ئەحمەد) (born 1962) is a Kurdish-British artist from Iraq who has been exhibited in galleries across Europe and the Middle East, including the Tate Britain and the Imperial War Museum. He has been described as "one of Kurdistan’s best-known artists" by The Economist.

== Life ==
Ahmed was born in 1962 and grew up in the neighbourhood of Chwar Bakh in Sulaymaniyah, Iraqi Kurdistan. Like many Kurds, he refused to participate in the Iran-Iraq War and fled into the mountains to join the . Ahmed joined the PUK but told the military leaders that he could not kill anybody and had never held a gun. Ahmed told Medya Magazine, "It wasn’t easy at first, some of the other Peshmergas were unable to understand why I did not want to hold a gun but many of the officials appreciated and respected the art I had made previously, from this they gave me a lot of freedom to express myself through art whilst in the mountains."

Ahmed crossed with the Peshmerga into Iran, where he saw for the first time Western art on display at the Shah's old palace and the Tehran Museum of Contemporary Art. He was then arrested and ordered to draw propaganda art for the Iranian regime, but pretended to be mad to cover his refusal. He was then able to cross into Turkey from Iran with a false passport, but was arrested again and spent time in two Turkish prison camps. He crossed back into Iraqi Kurdistan and witnessed the beginning of the Anfal genocide, being temporarily blinded after being exposed to nerve gas dropped from a helicopter. Back in Iran, he was given the opportunity to organise an art exhibition about Saddam Hussein's campaign against the Kurds, which eventually allowed him to travel outside of Iran with the help of PUK leader Jalal Talabani. Ahmed went to study first in Russia and then in London, where he also worked as a bus driver, waiter and market seller.

Ahmed told Arab Weekly that "Most of my drawings come from memory and my experience as a witness to the years of political and cultural repression, culminating in the horrendous event in 1988 (the Anfal) that left a profound effect on my life”.

== Exhibitions ==
In 2008, Ahmed was exhibited as part of the Displaced exhibition at the Imperial War Museum in London. In 2014, Ahmed featured in an exhibition to raise awareness and funds for the Kurds of Syria who were fighting against ISIS.

In 2017, one of Ahmed's works was installed on a wall in Reaya hill, Sulaymaniyah, Iraqi Kurdistan. In 2017 Ahmed also received the IAGS Prize for the Arts from the International Association of Genocide Scholars, University of Queensland, Brisbane, Australia.

Ahmed was exhibited as part of Kurdish arts charity Gulan's 'Road through Kurdistan' exhibition at the P21 Gallery in London's Euston in October 2019.

Ahmed is a researcher at the Kurdology Centre for Kurdish Studies, University of Sulaymaniyah. He is a graduate of the Institute of Art in Sulaymaniyah-Iraq (1985), and received an MA in Drawing from Camberwell College of Arts, London (2007). He also documented the Al-Anfal genocide of Saddam Hussein against Kurdish civilians in line drawings as part of a PhD undertaken in London in 2013.
