= Abdullah Al-Shammeri =

Abdullah Al-Shammeri may refer to:

- Abdullah Al-Shammeri (footballer, born 1991), Saudi football goalkeeper
- Abdullah Al-Shammeri (footballer, born 1993), Saudi football defender

== See also ==
- Abdulelah Al-Shammeri (born 1999), Saudi football midfielder
- Abdul Amir al-Shammari (born 1967), Iraqi army general
