= Saleh Saeb al-Jubouri =

- Born: 1898; Baghdad, Ottoman Iraq
- Died: 1993 (aged 94–95)
- Military career
- Allegiance: Ottoman Empire; Kingdom of Iraq
- Service years: Ottoman Empire: 1915–1919; Kingdom of Iraq: 1921–1951
- Rank: General
- Commands: Chief of Staff of the Iraqi Armed Forces
- Conflicts: World War I; Gallipoli campaign; Caucasus campaign; 1948 Palestine war; Battle of Jenin

Saleh Saeb al-Jubouri (Arabic: صالح صائب الجبوري; 1898–1993) was an Iraqi military officer. He joined the Ottoman army in 1915 and defected from it in 1919. He was the Chief of Staff of the Iraqi Army and led it in the Palestine War.

== Career ==
He received his military education in Baghdad and Constantinople, then joined the Ottoman Army in November 1915 as a platoon commander on the Çanakkale front. He then moved within the 10th Division to the Caucasus in early 1916 and participated in battles against the Russian Army. He was wounded three times during the war.

He was deployed to England in 1927 for a one-year attachment with a British Army brigade, where he underwent various training courses. He contributed to the establishment of the Iraqi Army in 1921. Al-Jubouri was appointed Chief of Staff of the Army in 1944. In his memoirs, while addressing the battles in Palestine in 1948, Al-Jubouri considered the Iraqi army to be "the only army that defended it". Al-Jubouri expressed his regret over the first truce on 11 June 1948, considering it a major mistake and warning that the beneficiary was the Israelis, who would exploit it to complete their training and arming.

He was retired in 1951, after which ministries such as the Ministries of Communications, Works, and Development were assigned to him, and he was also appointed as a member of the Senate until the overthrow of the monarchy in July 1958.

Al-Jubouri began writing his memoirs, which were completed in 1965 and published in Beirut in 1970.

== Bibliography ==
- The Plight Of Palestine And Its Political And Military Secrets
