= Chief of the General Staff (Iraq) =

Head of the armed forces of Iraq

Chief of the Iraqi General Staff
- رئاسة أركان الجيش (Arabic)
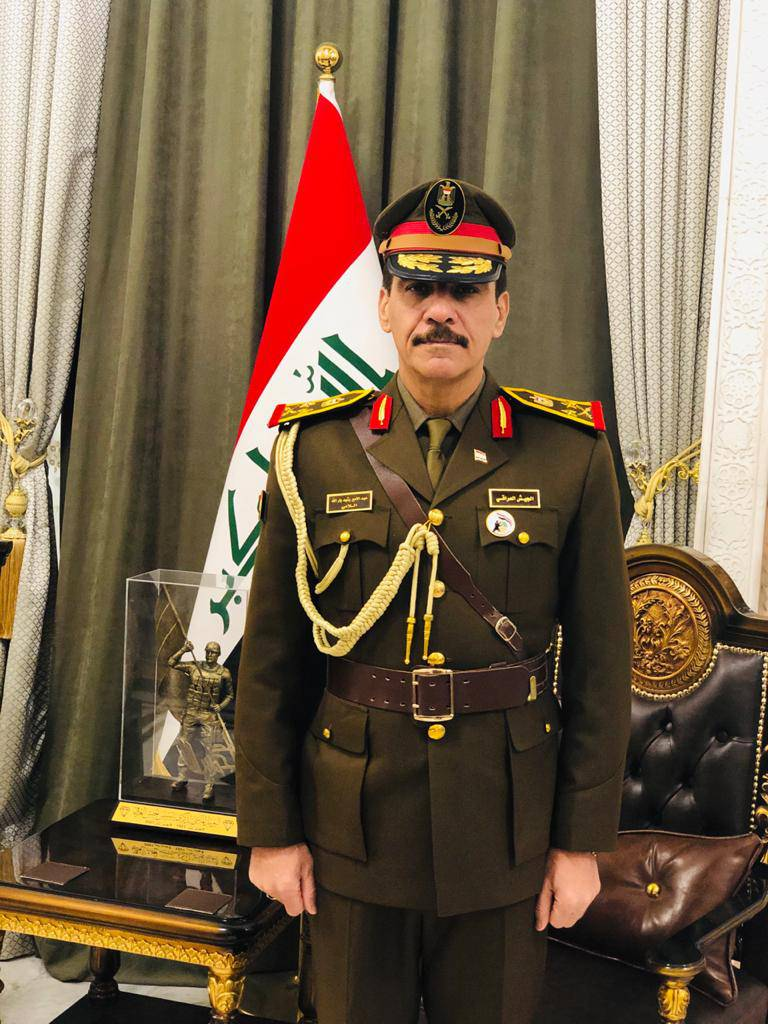
- Incumbent; General Abdul-Amir Yarallah since 8 June 2020
- Iraqi Armed Forces
- Reports to: Minister of Defence
- Seat: Green Zone, Baghdad
- Appointer: Prime Minister of Iraq
- Formation: 6 January 1921
- First holder: Nuri al-Said
- Website: Official website

The chief of the General Staff of the Armed Forces of Iraq (Arabic: رئيس أركان الجيش العراقي, romanized: Riʼāsat Arkān al-Jaysh al-ʻIrāqī) is the chief of the General Staff of the Iraqi Armed Forces. He is appointed by the Prime Minister of Iraq, who is the commander-in-chief. The position dates to the period of the Independence of Iraq. Up until the 2003 invasion of Iraq, the Chief of Staff was the second most senior officer in the Armed Forces behind the Minister of Defence.

Since 8 June 2020, the current chief of the General Staff is General Abdul-Amir Yarallah.

== List of officeholders ==
=== Kingdom of Iraq (1921–1958) ===
No.	Portrait	Name (Birth–Death)	Term of office			Ref.
No.	Portrait	Name (Birth–Death)	Took office	Left office	Time in office	Ref.
1		Lieutenant general Nuri al-Said (1888–1958)	6 January 1921	20 November 1922	1 year, 318 days	
2		Lieutenant general Taha al-Hashimi (1888–1961)	20 November 1922	28 July 1924	1 year, 251 days	
In 1924, the position of Chief of Staff of the Army was abolished and his duties were transferred to the position of Deputy Commander-in-Chief of the Armed Forces.
–		Lieutenant general Nuri al-Said (1888–1958) as Deputy Commander-in-Chief of the Armed Forces	28 July 1924	28 May 1928	3 years, 305 days	
Position reinstated 1928
2		Lieutenant general Taha al-Hashimi (1888–1961)	28 May 1928	29 October 1936	8 years, 154 days	
3		Lieutenant general Bakr Sidqi (1890–1937)	29 October 1936	11 August 1937 X	286 days	
4		Lieutenant general Abdul Latif Nouri (1888–1957)	15 August 1937	22 August 1937	7 days	
5		Lieutenant general Hussein Fawzi (1889–?)	22 August 1937	20 February 1940	2 years, 182 days	
6		Lieutenant general Amin Zaki Suleiman (1884–1971)	25 February 1940	29 May 1941	1 year, 93 days	
7		Lieutenant general Mohammed Amin Ahmed Al-Omari	29 May 1941	2 June 1941	4 days	
8		Lieutenant general Ismail Namik	2 June 1941	20 December 1944	3 years, 201 days	
9		General; Saleh Saeb al-Jubouri (1898–1993)	20 December 1944	18 August 1951	6 years, 241 days	
10		General; Nureddin Mahmud (1899–1981)	18 August 1951	29 January 1953	1 year, 164 days	
11		Major general Hussein Makki Khammas	29 January 1953	17 September 1953	231 days	
12		Lieutenant general Rafik Arif (1908–1992)	17 September 1953	14 July 1958	4 years, 300 days	

=== First Republic of Iraq (1958–1968) ===
No.	Portrait	Name (Birth–Death)	Term of office			Ref.
No.	Portrait	Name (Birth–Death)	Took office	Left office	Time in office	Ref.
1		Lieutenant general Ahmed Saleh al-Abdi (1912–1968)	14 July 1958	8 February 1963	4 years, 209 days	
2		Lieutenant general Tahir Yahya (1916–1986)	8 February 1963	20 November 1963	285 days	
3		Lieutenant general Abdul Rahman Arif (1916–2007)	20 November 1963	15 April 1966	2 years, 146 days	
4		Lieutenant general Hamudi Mahdi	15 April 1966	17 July 1967	1 year, 93 days	
5		Major general Ibrahim Faisal Ansari (1920–2010)	17 July 1967	5 August 1968	1 year, 19 days	

=== Ba'athist Iraq (1968–2003) ===
No.	Portrait	Name (Birth–Death)	Term of office			Ref.
No.	Portrait	Name (Birth–Death)	Took office	Left office	Time in office	Ref.
1		Lieutenant general Hammad Shehab (1922–1973)	5 August 1968	3 April 1970	1 year, 241 days	
2		General; Abdul Jabbar Shanshal (1920–2014)	3 April 1970	15 January 1984	13 years, 287 days	
3		General; Abdul Jawad Dhanuun (1936–2020)	15 January 1984	1986	1–2 years	
4		Major general Saaduddin Aziz Mustafa	1986	25 July 1987	0–1 years	
5		General; Nizar Al-Khazraji (born 1936)	25 July 1987	19 September 1990	3 years, 56 days	
6		General; Hussein Rashid (born 1940)	19 September 1990	1991	0–1 years	
7		General; Iyad Futayyih (1942–2018)	1991	1995	3–4 years	
8		General; Sultan Hashim Ahmad al-Tai (1945–2020)	1995	18 July 1995	0 years	
9		General; Abdul-Wahid Shannan ar-Ribat (born 1944)	18 July 1995	1999	3–4 years	
10		General; Ibrahim Ahmad Abd al-Sattar (1950–2010)	1999	9 April 2003	3–4 years	
On 23 May 2003, the Iraqi Army was dissolved, and all of its officers and personnel were discharged. It was later re-established on 8 August 2003.

=== Republic of Iraq (2003–present) ===
No.	Portrait	Name (Birth–Death)	Term of office			Ref.
No.	Portrait	Name (Birth–Death)	Took office	Left office	Time in office	Ref.
1		General; Babaker Zebari (born 1947)	8 August 2003	29 June 2015	11 years, 325 days	
2		General; Othman al-Ghanmi (born 1958)	29 June 2015	7 May 2020	4 years, 313 days	
3		General; Abdul-Amir Yarallah (born 1964)	7 May 2020	Incumbent	6 years, 123 days	
