= Alhakam Hassan =

Iraqi military officer

Lieutenant General Alhakam Hassan Ali Al-Tikriti
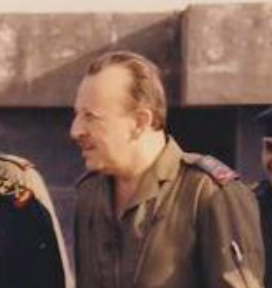
- Born: 1944; Tikrit, Iraq
- Died: 2015 (aged 70–71); Amman, Jordan
- Burial place: Sahab Cemetery
- Military career
- Allegiance: Iraq
- Branch: Iraqi Air Force; Iraqi Army Aviation Command
- Service years: 1966–2003
- Rank: Lieutenant General
- Unit: No. 16 Squadron
- Commands: Deputy Commander of the Iraqi Air Force
- Conflicts: Six-Day War; Yom Kippur War; Ogaden War (seconded to Somalia); Iran–Iraq War; Gulf War; Iraq War
- Awards: Order of Independence (Jordan); Mother of All Battles Medal

Alhakam Hassan Ali Al-Tikriti (Arabic: الحكم حسن علي التكريتي; 1944–2015) was an Iraqi military officer and pilot from Tikrit, Iraq. Throughout his career in the Iraqi Air Force, he held various leadership positions and served in several conflicts.

== Early life and education ==
Hassan Ali was born to a Sunni Arab family in Tikrit in 1944, he completed his primary and secondary education in Tikrit before enrolling in the Iraqi Air Force College in 1963. He graduated in 1966 with the rank of pilot lieutenant and was assigned to the Hawker Hunter fighter aircraft. As he continued his service, he transitioned to flying MiG-21 aircraft, further enhancing his skills and expertise in the air force.

=== Training and certifications ===
Throughout his military career, Hassan Ali pursued specialized training both in Iraq and abroad. He obtained several notable certifications, including a Flight Instructor Certificate from Pakistan, a master's degree from the Joint Staff College in India, a Night Flight Instructor Certificate from the United Kingdom, and a Personnel Selection Certificate from the United Kingdom. Additionally, he earned a Higher War College Certificate from the Nasser Academy in Egypt and a Flight Safety Certificate from Yugoslavia. These credentials reflect his dedication to professional development in aviation and military leadership.

In the later stages of his career, Hassan Ali transitioned into a largely political role, serving as the Governor of Babylon until the 2003 invasion of Iraq.

== Career ==
Hassan Ali served as a MiG-21 fighter pilot in several conflicts involving Iraq. In 1967, he took part in the Six-Day War, flying combat missions as part of Iraq's support for Arab forces against Israel. He later participated in the October War in 1973, engaging in aerial operations in support of Egyptian and Syrian forces.

In the late 1970s, Hassan Ali was seconded to the Somali Air Force during the Ogaden War, providing aerial support for Somalia in its conflict against Ethiopia. His role in the war reflected Iraq's military cooperation with allied nations in Africa.

As his career progressed, he transitioned into senior staff roles. During the Iran–Iraq War, he was involved in planning air operations and overseeing defense strategies. Throughout the Gulf War, he worked in coordination efforts to resist the US-led coalition’s military campaign against Iraq. By the time of the 2003 invasion of Iraq, he was a senior officer within the General Command, helping to organize defensive operations against coalition forces before the collapse of the Iraqi government.

== Later life ==
Hassan Ali passed away in Amman, Jordan.
