= Abdul Jawad Dhanuun =

Iraqi Army officer and Director of Military Intelligence

Colonel General Abdul Jawad Dhanuun
- عبد الجواد ذنون
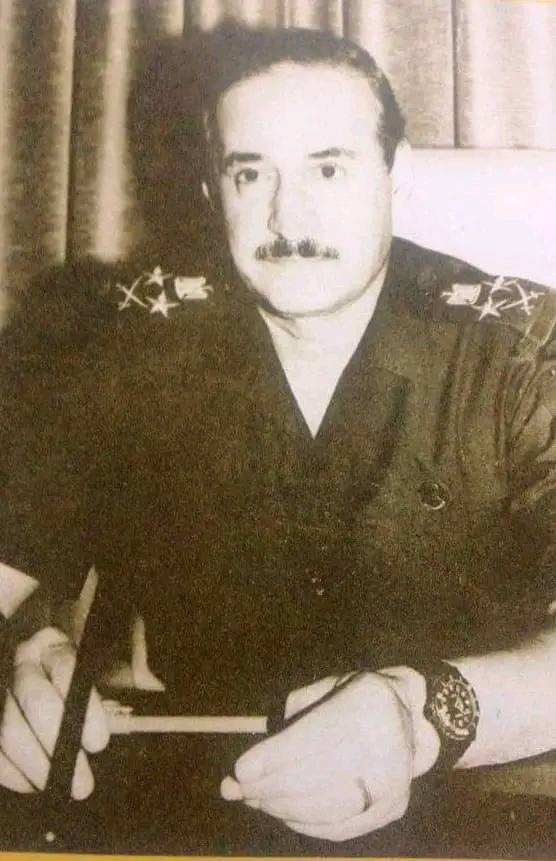
- Dhanuun in his office

Chief of the General Staff of the Army and the Armed Forces
- In office 1984–1986
- Preceded by: Abdul Jabbar Shanshal
- Succeeded by: Saad Eddin Aziz Mustafa

Director of the Directorate of General Military Intelligence
- In office 1980–1983
- Succeeded by: Mahmoud Shaker Shaheen

Member of the Regional Command of the Iraqi Regional Branch

Personal details
- Born: عبد الجواد ذنون; Abdul Jawad Dhanuun; 1936 Mosul, Kingdom of Iraq
- Died: 15 November 2020 (aged 83–84) Amman, Jordan
- Party: Iraqi Regional Branch of the Arab Socialist Ba'ath Party

Military service
- Allegiance: Iraq
- Branch/service: Iraqi Ground Forces
- Years of service: 1960–2003
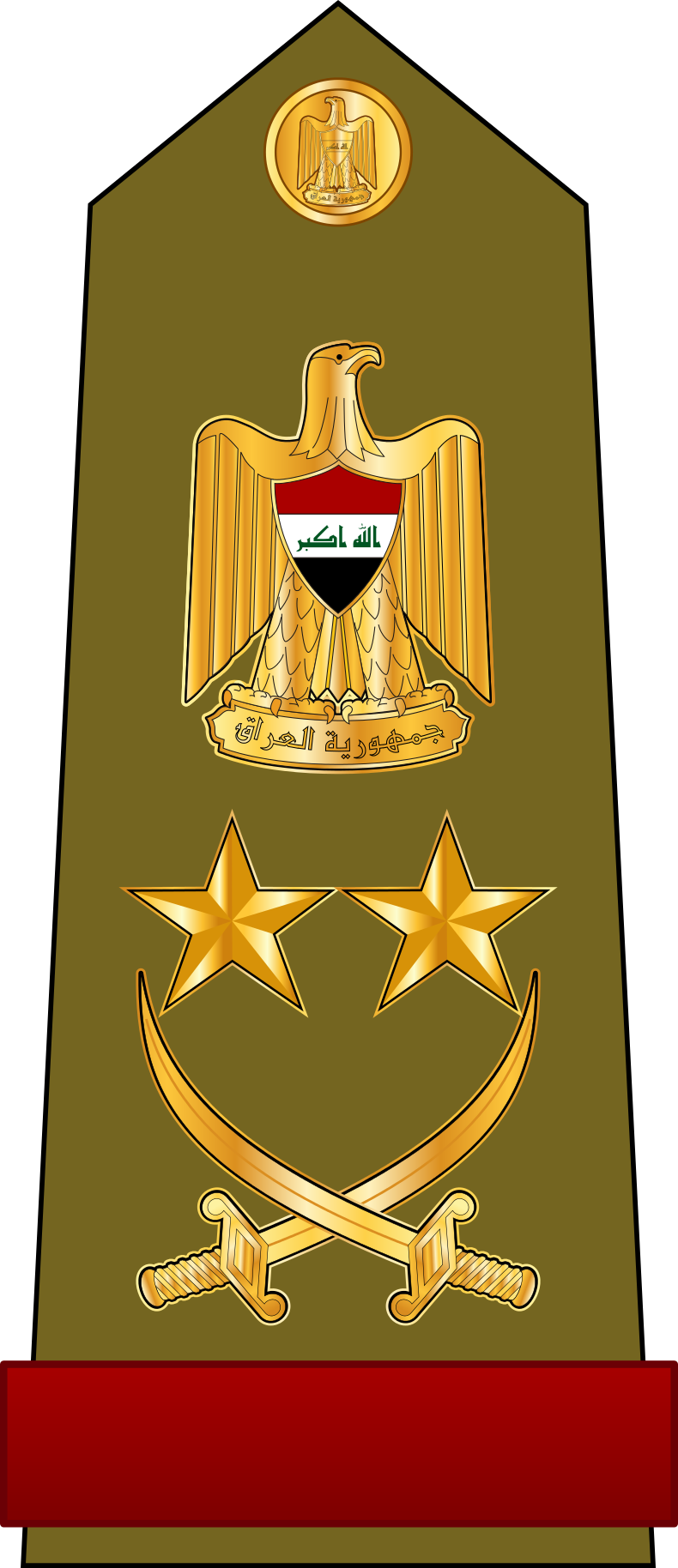
- Rank: Colonel General
- Battles/wars: Yom Kippur War; Second Iraqi–Kurdish War; Iran–Iraq War; Gulf War; 2003 Iraq War

Abdul Jawad Dhanuun (Arabic: عبد الجواد ذنون) was a former Iraqi military officer, who formerly served as the Chief of the General Staff of the Iraqi Armed Forces, Director of Military Intelligence and the Governor of Nineveh Governorate.

== Early life ==
He was born in Mosul in 1936. He completed his secondary education in 1960 and enrolled in the Baghdad Military Academy.

== Military career ==
He graduated from the 35th cycle of the Baghdad Military Academy and obtained a Bachelor of Military Sciences. He also graduated from the 34th cycle of the Iraqi Staff College and obtained a Master of Military Sciences.

He held many leadership positions in the Iraqi Armed Forces, including Director of Military Intelligence, member of the General Command of the Armed Forces, assistant Chief of Staff for Operations Affairs, Chief of Staff of the Iraqi Armed Forces, member of the Security Bureau of the Arab Socialist Ba'ath Party, governor of Nineveh, and Commandant of the Trebil Border Crossing with Jordan.

Dhanuun left Iraq after the American-led invasion in 2003 and had resided in Jordan ever since.

== Death ==
Dhanuun died in Amman in 2020 from complications from COVID-19.
