= Saber Abdel Aziz al-Douri =

Iraqi politician and Governor of Baghdad (born 1949)

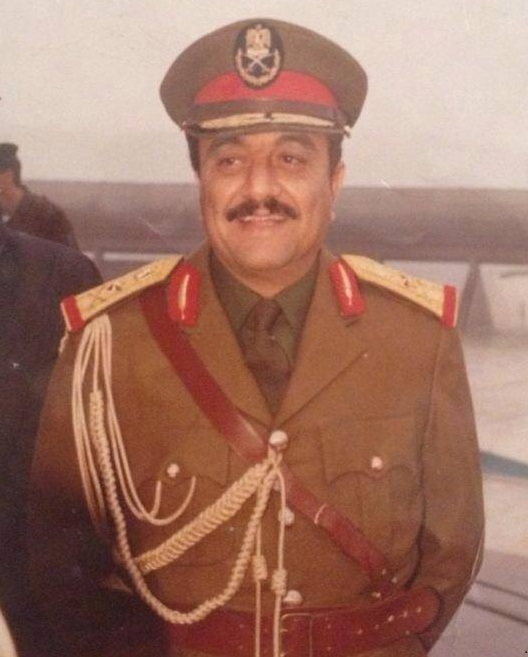

Governor of Baghdad Governorate
- In office 2001–2003
- Succeeded by: Ali al-Haidari

Governor of Karbala Governorate
- In office 1996–2001

Director of General Military Intelligence
- In office April 1986 – 1990
- Preceded by: Mahmoud Shaker Shaheen
- Succeeded by: Wafiq al-Samarrai

Personal details
- Born: 1 July 1949 (age 76) Ad-Dawr, Tikrit, Kingdom of Iraq
- Party: Arab Socialist Ba'ath Party
- Occupation: Intelligence officer
- Religion: Sunni Islam

Military service
- Allegiance: Ba'athist Iraq
- Years of service: 1965–2003
- Rank: Lieutenant General
- Battles/wars: Iran–Iraq War; Gulf War; 1991 uprising in Iraq

Saber Abdel Aziz al-Douri (Arabic: صابر عبد العزيز الدوري) (born 1 July 1949) is a former Iraqi politician, intelligence officer and Governor of Baghdad.

== Background ==
Aziz comes from Ad-Dawr, and is a member of the Albu Haidar tribe in Saladin Governorate.

== Career ==
=== Military career ===
Aziz graduated from the Iraqi Military Academy in March 1967, and then later went on to graduate from the Staff College.

During his career in the military he held numerous positions;

- Commander of the 14th tank battalion.
- Commander of the 10th Armoured Brigade.
- Commander of the 17th Armored Division.
- Director of military strategy in the Iraqi Ministry of Defense.
- Promoted to membership of the General Command of the Armed Forces in July 1985.
- Was appointed Director of General Military Intelligence in April 1986.
- Promoted to the rank of Lieutenant General in 1989.

He was later appointed to several political posts. Between 1996 and 2001 he served as Governor of Karbala Province, and following this he served as Governor of Baghdad Province from 2001 to 2003.

== Iraqi Special Tribunal ==
Aziz was charged by the Iraqi Special Tribunal with war crimes and crimes against humanity relating to his role as the Director of Military Intelligence during the al-Anfal Campaign. He was found guilty and sentenced to life in prison.
