= Tujhe Nahin Chhodunga =

- Directed by: Iqbal Khan
- Produced by: Abdul Sattar Khan
- Starring: Akbar Khan; Zeenat Aman
- Music by: C. P. Bhati
- Release date: 12 April 1991
- Country: India
- Language: Hindi

Tujhe Nahin Chhodunga is a 1991 Bollywood film produced by Abdul Sattar Khan, directed by Iqbal Khan, starring Akbar Khan, Shekhar Suman, Swapna, Suresh Oberoi, Shafi Inamdar, Amrish Puri and Zeenat Aman.

== Soundtrack ==
All lyrics are written by Hasan Kamal.

No.	Title	Singer(s)	Length
1.	"Hum Toh Be-Maut Maare Gaye"	Kishore Kumar
2.	"Aaj Saqi Tere Maikade Mein Tujhse"	Amit Kumar, Mohammed Aziz, Anuradha Paudwal, Alka Yagnik
3.	"Bam Chik Bam Chik Chik Bam Bam"	Amit Kumar, Alka Yagnik
4.	"Tumse Nazar Milake Pareshan Ho Gayi"	Alka Yagnik
5.	"Dhalke Chunariya Re"	Shabbir Kumar, Asha Bhosle
