= Abdul-Satar al-Bahadli =

Iraqi Shi'a cleric

Sheikh Abdul-Satar al-Bahadli is a senior Iraqi Shia cleric and confederate of Muqtada al-Sadr.

On 7 May 2004, responding to pictures of the abuse of prisoners by American integrators in Abu Gharib prison speaking in the city of Basra, he made a public announcement at a mosque offering cash rewards: 350 dollars for the capture of male US or British soldiers, 150 dollars for male US or British soldiers killed. If captured, he gave permission to keep female Western soldiers as slaves.
