= Ibrahim Ahmad Abd al-Sattar =

Chief of staff of the Iraqi armed forces under Saddam Hussein

Ibrahim Ahmad Abd al-Sattar Muhammad
- إبراهيم أحمد عبد الستار محمد
- Born: 9 September 1950
- Died: 28 October 2010 (aged 60)
- Military career
- Allegiance: Ba'athist Iraq
- Branch: Iraqi Ground Forces
- Commands: Chief of the General Staff of the Iraqi Armed Forces
- Conflicts: 1991 Iraqi uprisings

Ibrahim Ahmad Abd Al-Sattar Muhammad Al-Tikriti (9 September 1950 – 28 October 2010) was an Iraqi military officer who was the Chief of the General Staff of the Iraqi Armed Forces under the rule of Saddam Hussein from 1999 until 2003. He was taken into custody on 15 May 2003.

He was the "jack of spades" in the U.S. deck of most-wanted Iraqi playing cards and was reported by CENTCOM to be in custody in May 2003.

On 2 March 2009, Abdul Sattar was sentenced to life in prison for his role in the violent repression of a Shiite uprising in 1991.

He died from cancer on 28 October 2010 while being held in US and Iraqi custody.
