= Abdul Sattar Jawad =

Abdul Sattar Jawad (عبدالستار جواد; born April 10, 1943) is an Iraqi-born professor of comparative literature and Middle Eastern studies at Duke University. He was a Barksdale Fellow at the University of Mississippi, Honors College. Prior to this he was a visiting professor at the department of English and American language and literature, Harvard University, and he was with the John Hope Franklin Center for Interdisciplinary and International Studies at Duke University. He received a Ph.D. in English literature and journalism, from London's City University, (UK).

Apart from teaching Arabic and English literature, he is an expert on the works of T. S. Eliot and those of William Shakespeare. He had translated Eliot's The Waste Land into Arabic and republished it in his book T.S Eliot in Baghdad, A Study in Eliot's Influence on the Free Verse Movement in Iraq and the Arab World, 2014. He is also an expert on Iraqi media and academia. Jawad has written 15 books on literature and media, and has edited some literary magazines and newspapers in English and Arabic. Before coming to Duke, he was dean of college of arts, University of Baghdad, and edited the Baghdad Mirror.
