= Directorate of General Military Intelligence =

Former Iraqi Agency

- مديرية الإستخبارات العسكرية العامة
- DGMI logo

Agency overview
- Formed: 1932
- Dissolved: 2003
- Jurisdiction: Government of Iraq
- Headquarters: Baghdad, Iraq
- Agency executive: Zuhayr Talib Abd al-Sattar al-Naqib, Director
- Parent agency: Independent

The Iraqi Directorate of General Military Intelligence (DGMI) (Arabic: مديرية الإستخبارات العسكرية العامة, romanized: Mudiriyyat al-Istikhabarat al-'Askariyya al-'Amma) was the national military intelligence and security agency of Iraq from 1932 to 2003.

Its responsibilities included:

- Assessing threats of a military nature to Iraq;
- Maintaining a network of informants in Iraq and abroad, including foreign personnel, and military human intelligence;
- Monitoring the Iraqi military and ensuring the loyalty of the officer corps;
- Providing intelligence sharing with other military intelligence services allied to Iraq;
- Protection of military and military-industrial facilities;
- Tactical and strategic reconnaissance of regimes hostile to Iraq.

The Directorate of General Military Intelligence is divided into a Administrative Bureau, Political, and Special Activity.

It employed embassy personnel, especially the military attaché and his office within the embassy. It had duties inside the army, but it is unknown what these duties were. In 1979 a document called the Strategic Work Plan by Khalil al-Azzawi, who was head of operations for the Directorate of General Military Intelligence was leaked. The plan set goals of the overseas branches of the agency, e.g. the military attaché's office in London was told to provide reports of nuclear, chemical and bacteriological installations. Also photos of naval bases and their specifications were required.

In a separate section Ba'athist Iraq agents were expected to uncover the structure of North Atlantic Treaty Organization (NATO) forces such as its land, air, and sea bases around the world, especially in the Mediterranean Sea.

Several opposition leaders were found dead in Beirut and Paris. Their involvement in the assassinations of Palestinian leaders in 1980 is also likely.

== Directors ==
- Abdul Jawad Dhanuun (1980 – 1983)
- Mahmoud Shaker Shaheen (1983 – 1986)
- Saber Abdel Aziz al-Douri (1986 – 1990)
- Wafiq al-Samarrai (1990 – 1991)
- Zuhayr Talib Abd al-Sattar al-Naqib (2002 – 2003)

== See also ==
- Law enforcement in Iraq
- Directorate of General Security - Former internal Iraqi security agency
- Iraqi Intelligence Service - Former external Iraqi security agency
- Iraqi Special Security Organization - Former security agency responsible for security of VIP's
- Iraqi National Intelligence Service - current intelligence agency
