= Abdul-Amir Yarallah =

Chief of the General Staff of the Armed Forces of Iraq

General Abdul-Amir Yarallah
- عبد الأمير يار الله
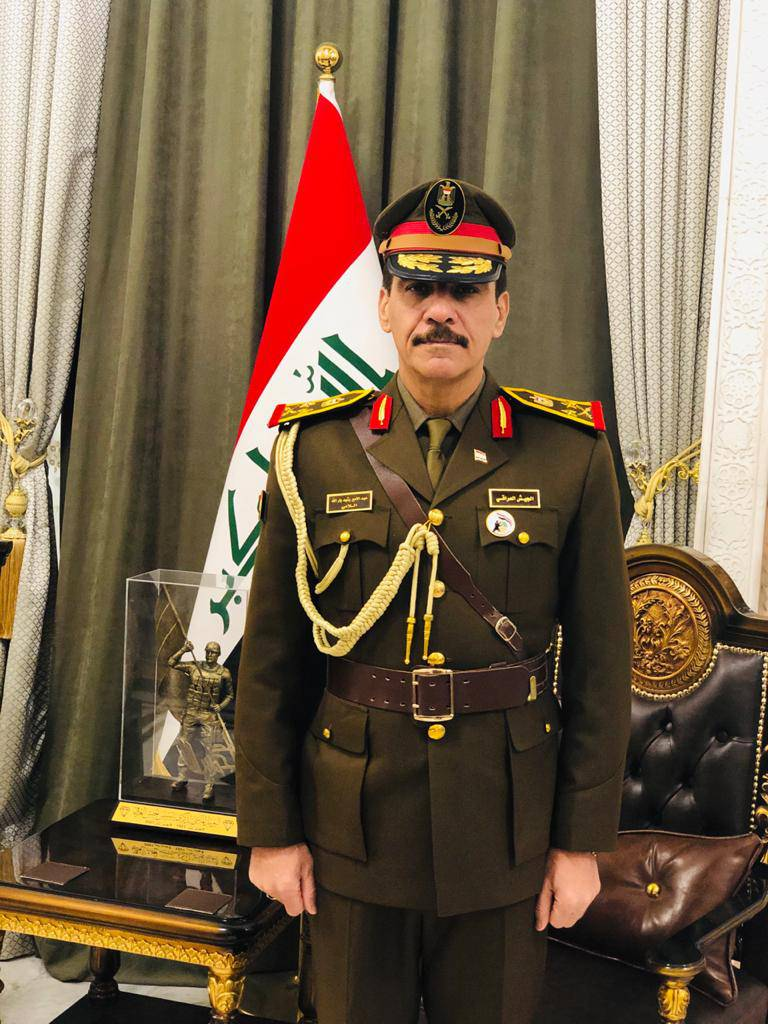
- Yarallah in 2021
- Born: 18 August 1964 (age 62); Baghdad, Iraqi Republic
- Education: Iraqi Defence University for Military Studies (Master's Degree)
- Military career
- Allegiance: Iraq (1984–present)
- Branch: Iraqi Ground Forces
- Service years: 1984–present
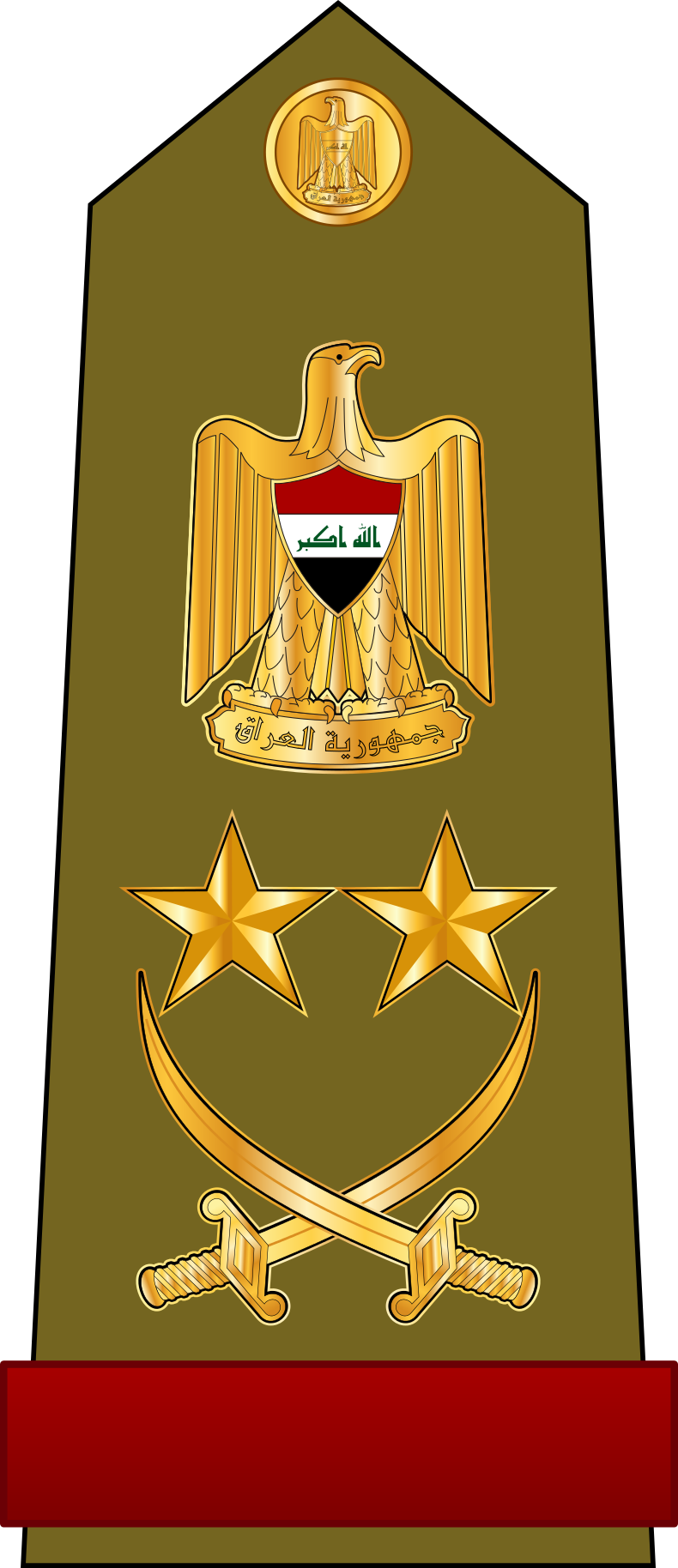
- Rank: General
- Commands: General Staff of the Republic of Iraq; Commander of the Ground Forces; Commander of Basra Operations
- Conflicts: Iran–Iraq War; Gulf War; War in Iraq (2013–2017): Battle of Mosul (2016–2017); Battle of Tal Afar (2017); Battle of Hawija

Abdul-Amir Rashid Yarallah (Arabic: عبد الأمير رشيد يار الله; born 18 August 1964) is an Iraqi army general who currently serves as the Chief of the General Staff of the Iraqi Armed Forces, serving in the position since June 8, 2020.

Yarallah graduated from the Iraqi Defence University for Military Studies in 1994 with a master’s degree in military science.
