= Abdul-Amir al-Shammari =

Iraqi officeholder

- عبد الامير الشمري
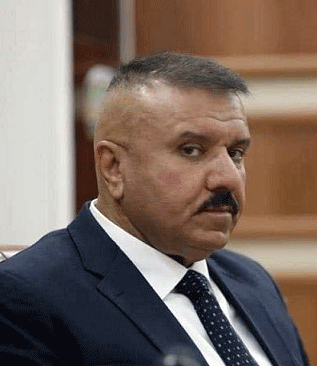
- Shammari in 2022

Director of the Office of the Commander in Chief
- Incumbent
- Assumed office 21 July 2026
- Prime Minister: Ali al-Zaidi
- Preceded by: Farouk al-Araji

Minister of the Interior
- In office 27 October 2022 – 14 May 2026
- Prime Minister: Mohammed Shia al-Sudani
- Preceded by: Othman al-Ghanmi

Deputy Chief of Joint Operations Command
- In office 7 June 2020 – 27 October 2022

Chief of Baghdad Operations Command
- In office 15 August 2017 – 7 June 2020

Personal details
- Born: 1967 (age 58–59) Al Diwaniyah, Iraq

Military service
- Allegiance: Iraq
- Branch/service: Iraqi Ground Forces
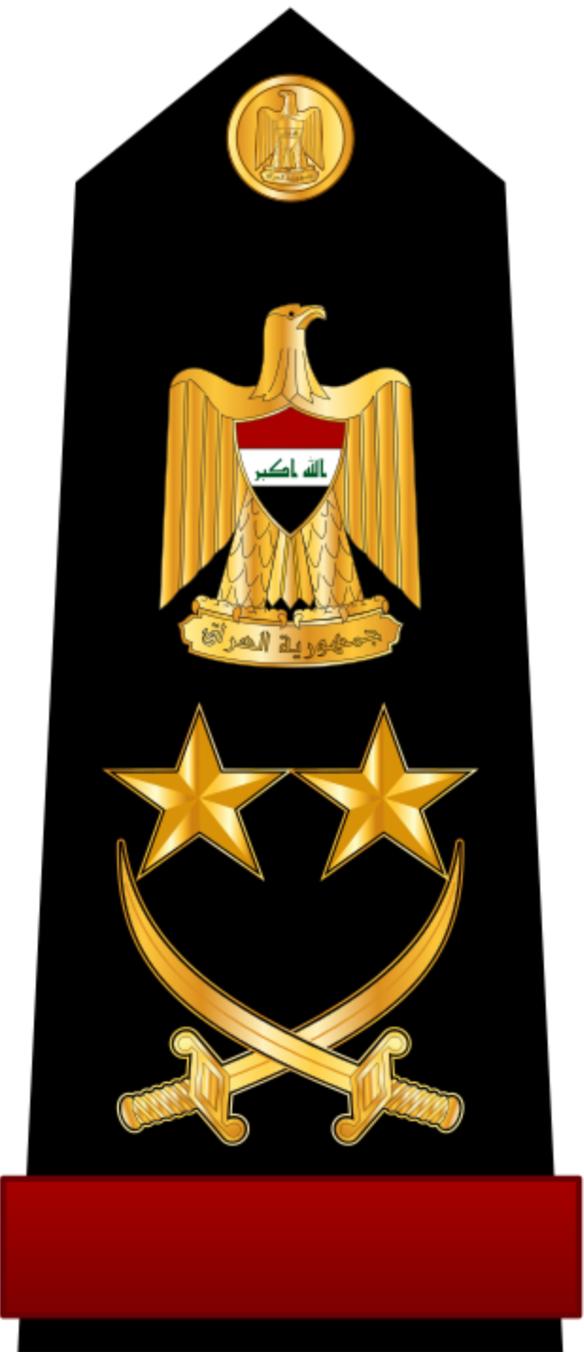
- Rank: General
- Commands: Joint Operations; Baghdad Operations

Abdul-Amir Al-Shammari (Arabic: عبد الامير الشمري; born 1967) is an Iraqi army general who is currently the director of the Office of the Commander in Chief. He served as minister of interior in the government of Mohammed Shia' Al Sudani and previously served as deputy chief of the Joint Operations Command during 2020–2022. He has also served as military inspector for the Ministry of Defence, security supervisor for Nineveh Governorate and head of Baghdad Operations Command.

== Career ==
In 2024, Al-Shammari met with United Kingdom Home Secretary Yvette Cooper to coordinate efforts to prevent human trafficking from Iraq to the U.K. The resulting plan was described as an "unprecedented" cooperation effort to confront human trafficking and returning failed asylum seekers back to Iraq. In 2025, Al-Shammari signed an agreement with the government of Spain to cooperate on security and crime reduction efforts.
