= Abdul Sattar Khan (producer) =

Indian film director and producer (born 1954)

- Born: 21 December 1954 (age 71); Bikaner Rajasthan India
- Occupations: Director, producer
- Parent(s): Ibrahim Khan Poud & Subhani Poud

Abdul Sattar Khan (born 21 December 1954) is an Indian film director and producer who has produced numerous Bollywood films including: Ek Baar Chale Aao, Tujhe Nahin Chhodunga and In India Today as director. His forthcoming film as director and producer is Atal Faisla, from his production house A.S.S Films.

== Filmography ==
Year	Film	Producer	Notes
1983	Ek Baar Chale Aao	Yes	
1989	Tujhe Nahin Chhodunga	Yes	
1994	In India Today	Yes	
2018	Atal Faisla	Yes	
