= Babaker Zebari =

Babaker Baderkhan Shawkat Zebari
- بابەکر بەدرخان شەوکەت زێباری
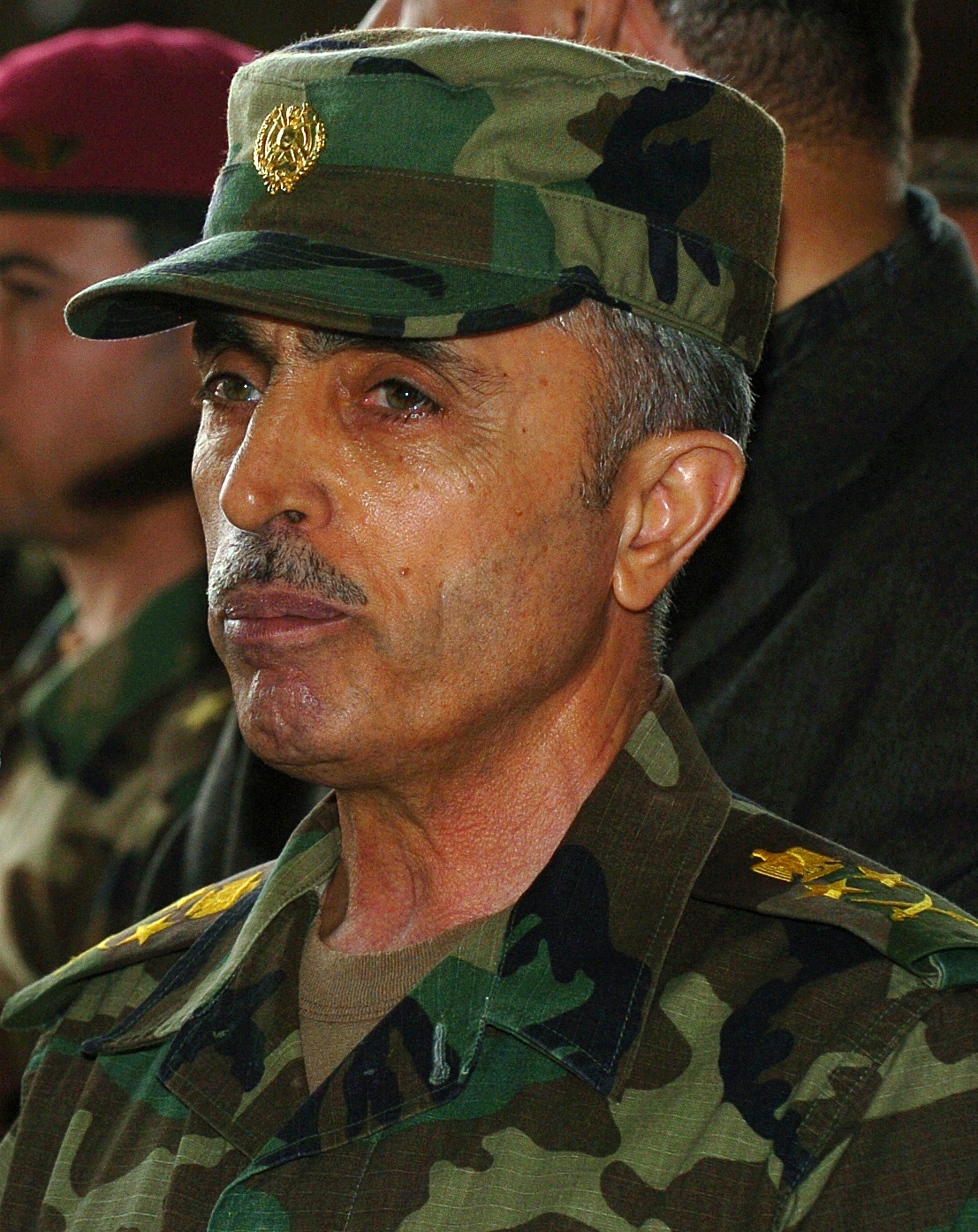
- Born: 1945 (age 80–81); Erbil, Kingdom of Iraq
- Education: Rustamiyah Military Academy
- Military career
- Allegiance: Iraq (1970–1973); KDP (1973–2003); Iraq (2003–2015)
- Service: Iraqi Ground Forces
- Service years: 1970–2015
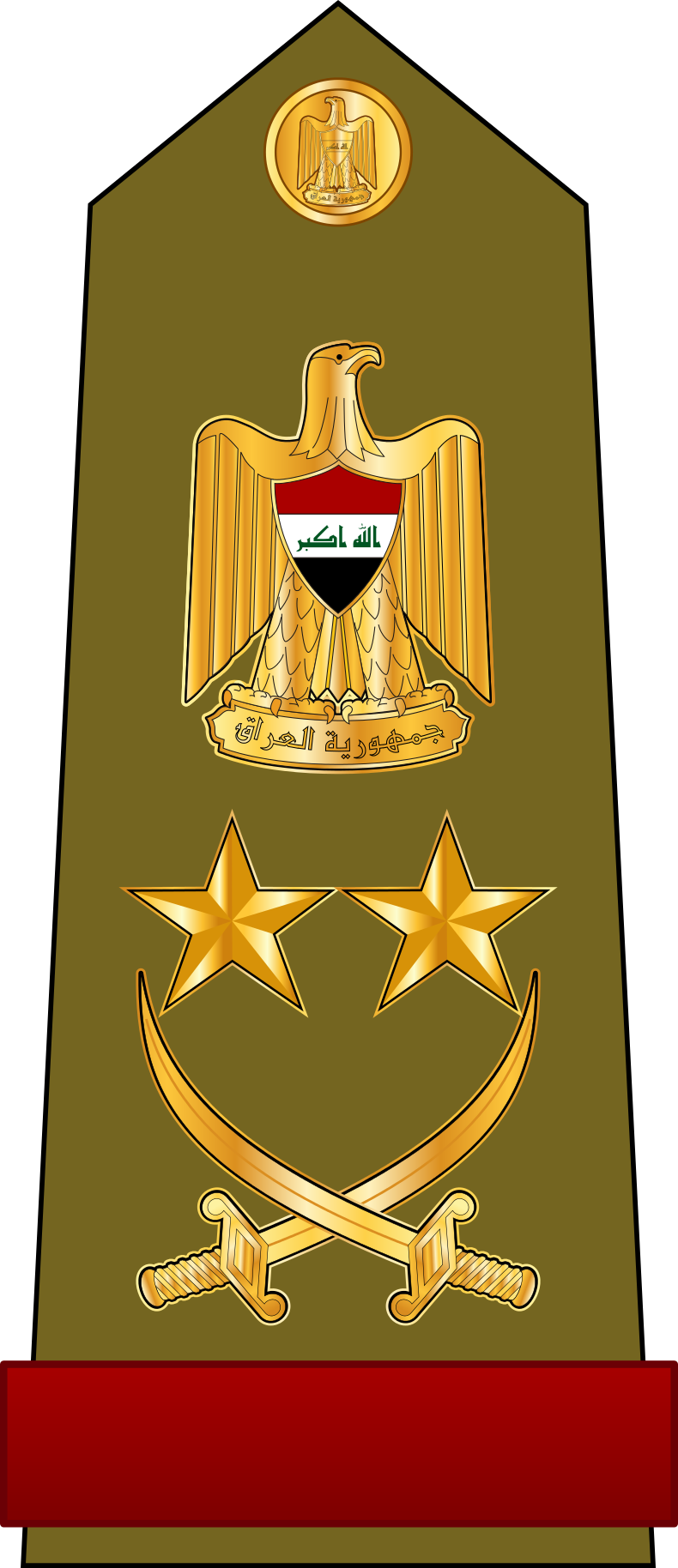
- Rank: General
- Commands: Chairman of the Joint Chiefs of Staff, Iraq
- Known for: Military leadership in the Kurdish and Iraqi forces
- Conflicts: Second Iraqi–Kurdish War; 1991 uprisings in Iraq; Iraq War; Operation Phantom Phoenix
- Awards: Barzani Award; Legion of Merit

Babaker Baderkhan Shawkat Zebari (Kurdish: بابەکر بەدرخان شەوکەت زێباری) is a retired Iraqi Kurdish General and former KDP politician . Zebari was chief of staff of the Iraqi Army from 2004 till 2015.

== Education ==
Babakir graduated from Rustamiyah Military Academy in Baghdad, in 1969. At this time Kurdish citizens were scarcely allowed to serve, at the Iraqi military, at all. The Academy included the Iraqi Commando School, the Thunderbolt School for Rangers, the Airborne School and a special forces School for battlefield combat. He majored in anti- tank weapon systems like COBRA, SSll and SAKER.

== Career ==
Zebari initially served in the Iraqi Army, but in 1973, left the Iraqi military and joined Mustafa Barzani Rebels.

Appointed to deputy commander, of the Kurdish forces and under the leadership of Mustafa Barzani, he fought with the Peshmerga (Kurdish military forces) against the Iraq Government under Saddam Hussain. In 1975 he was assigned as the highest-ranking commander of the Kurdish Air Defense Brigade in Amedi.

After the Algier agreement and the defeat of the Kurdish forces, Babakir Zebari and his family joined Mustafa Barzani and moved to the Kurdish populated territories of Iran. In 1979, Babakir came back to the Kurdish territories of Iraq, alongside Mustafa Barzani and joined the Kurdish uprising. In which he served as deputy commander of the Kurdish Military Forces.

In 1989, Babakir became a member of the Central Committee of the KDP. In-between 1980 and 1991 he was the deputy commander of the Military forces in Schaichān and Akrê. In 1991 in he was the deputy commander for the regions of Duhok and Mosul and again lead the Kurdish Uprising against the Saddam Hussein Regime after the second Golf- War. During the Iraq War in 2003, deputy commander Babakir played an important role in supporting coalition forces in the region. In 2003, after the fall of Saddam Hussein, Babakir became Commanding General and Chief of Staff of the Iraqi Army due to his connections to the US forces.

In June 2015, General Babaker Zebari "has been retired" on Iraqi Prime Minister Abadi's orders. Abadi has sacked dozens of army and police officers in an effort to restructure and improve security forces that performed disastrously against ISIS. But it is unclear if Zebari was removed as part of that effort, or for other reasons.

In 2017, an Iraqi court issued an arrest warrant for former army chief of staff Babaker Zebari for allegedly misusing public money during his tenure. The court cited a decision by Zebari to give seven Defense Ministry vehicles to civilians as grounds to issue the arrest warrant, the Iraqi parliament’s public integrity body said in a statement. The arrest warrant for Zebari, a Kurd, came amid tension between Baghdad and the Kurdish Regional Government over last month’s controversial referendum for Kurdish independence.

Zebari nowadays retains the position of the Kurdistan Region's Presidential Military Advisor.

== Decorations and Badges ==
- Barzani Award
- Legion of Merit (United States)
