= Abdul Sattar Khan (politician) =

Pakistani politician

MPA Abdul Sattar Khan

Member of the Provincial Assembly of Khyber Pakhtunkhwa
- Incumbent
- Assumed office 2013 - 2018
- Constituency: PK-63 (Kohistan-III)

Personal details
- Born: 5 June 1975 (age 51)
- Party: Pakistan Muslim League (N)
- Occupation: Politician

Abdul Sattar Khan (born 5 June 1975) is a Pakistani politician hailing from Kohistan District. He served as member of the Khyber Pakhtunkhwa Assembly from 2013 to 2018. He belongs to the Pakistan Muslim League (N).
