= Zuhayr Talib Abd al-Sattar al-Naqib =

Iraqi intelligence officer (c.1948–2020)

Zuhayr Talib Abd al-Sattar al-Naqib (Arabic: زهير طالب عبد الستار النقيب; c. 1948 – 15 June 2020) was the last director of military intelligence in Iraq before the 2003 US led invasion of Iraq.

== Biography ==
Al-Naqib surrendered to Lieutenant Brian Wirtz (1-41 FA, 3ID) on 23 April 2003. He was the "seven of hearts" on the US-led coalition's deck of most-wanted Iraqi playing cards. He suffered from vision loss while in prison. He died on 15 June 2020 in Amman, Jordan.
