= List of Iraqi Air Force aircraft squadrons =

Squadrons are the main form of flying unit of the Iraqi Air Force (IqAF).

- No. 1 Squadron
  - 1931 - established in April at RAF Hinaidi, flying the de Havilland DH.60 Moth.
  - 1932 - reinforced with three de Havilland Puss Moths.
  - 1941 - flying the Nisr from Firnas AB, near Mosul.
  - 1948 - started flying the Hawker Fury in January. Malovany cites a 1992 anniversary interview with the Air Force commander, Lieutenant General Muzahim Sa'b Hassan al-Tikriti, who said that the 1st Squadron sent a flight of Avro Anson aircraft to the Mafraq airbase in Jordan during the 1948 Arab-Israeli War, and flights of Furies to the Damascus airport and to Egypt.
  - 1958 - in the process of conversion to the de Havilland Venom FB.50 at Firnas AB. The Venoms were flown alongside the older Furies until around 1967.
  - 1967 - declared operational on the Sukhoi Su-7BMK in December.
  - 1973 - based at Al Hurriya Air Base. Deployed to Damascus International Airport on 8 October.
  - 1974 - re-equipped with Sukhoi Su-20s.
  - 1995 - disbanded.
  - 2008 - started receiving Cessna 172s, flying from Kirkuk Air Base.
  - 2011 - 1st Sq was renumbered 201st Squadron during March 2011.
  - 2015 - flying the Cessna 172 from Ali Air Base.
- 2nd Squadron

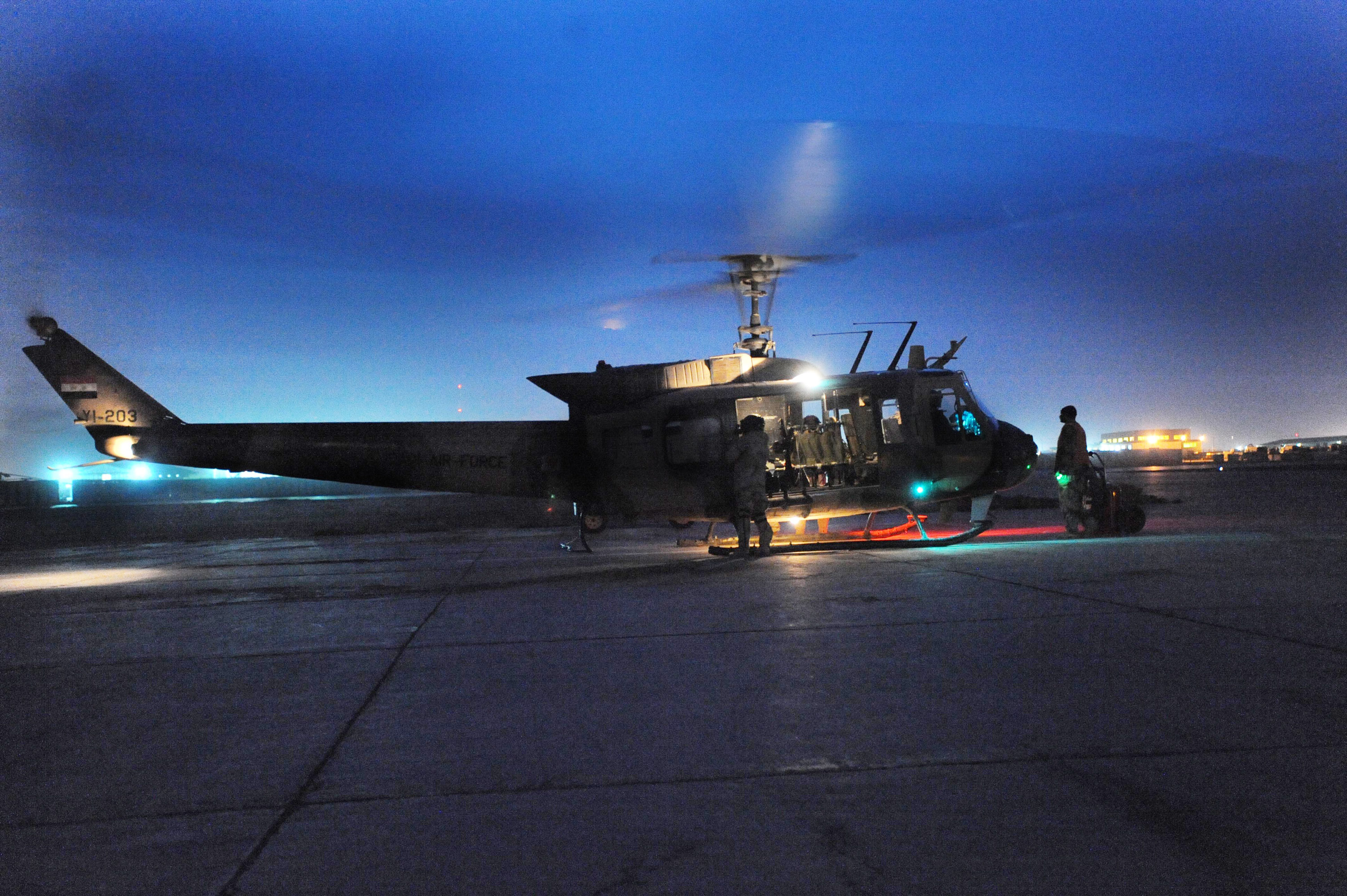
Night flying certification for the UH-1 crews of the Iraqi 2nd Squadron

  - 1933 - established in June, flying de Havilland Dragons.
  - 1941 - flying the de Havilland Dragon and the Vickers Vincent from Rasheed Air Base.
  - 1958 - Avro Anson, Stinson L-5, Cessna O-1A, Westland Dragonfly. Based at Rasheed Air Base.
  - 1959 - started receiving Mil Mi-4s.
  - 1967 - flying Mil Mi-4s from Firnas Air Base near Mosul.
  - 1973 - flying Mil Mi-1s and Mi-4s from Firnas AB.
  - 2003 - disbanded.
  - 2004-05 - reestablished at Taji flying donated Jordanian UH-1s, but suffered severe spares shortages.
  - 2007 - five rebuilt Huey II helicopters were turned over to Squadron 2 at Taji. Over the next few months, several were occasionally flown back to NAMAB, Phoenix Base, and Baghdad’s Green Zone to take Iraqi defense officials aloft for the benefit of the press. Additionally, the Hueys were used to train Iraqi airmen. Although the rebuilt aircraft had been factory-equipped with armor, they remained within Taji’s airspace for the first several months, as insurgents had damaged or shot down several US helicopters in only two weeks, in late February and early March. It was not until 10 April that two Iraqi pilots made Squadron 2’s first flights outside Taji’s perimeter. Those sorties included live-fire exercises using externally mounted machine guns. Five more aircraft arrived at NAMAB on 2 May, and the final six were airlifted in from the United States on 29 July, by which time Squadron 2 had accumulated about 1,300 flying hours in training missions, passenger movement, and infrastructure protection and assessment."
  - 2010 - at Taji with Bell UH-1s in November 2009 and May 2010.
  - Scramble.nl does not list the squadron as operational in January 2019. The UH-1s have been transferred to the army, in 2016 at the latest.
- 3rd Squadron

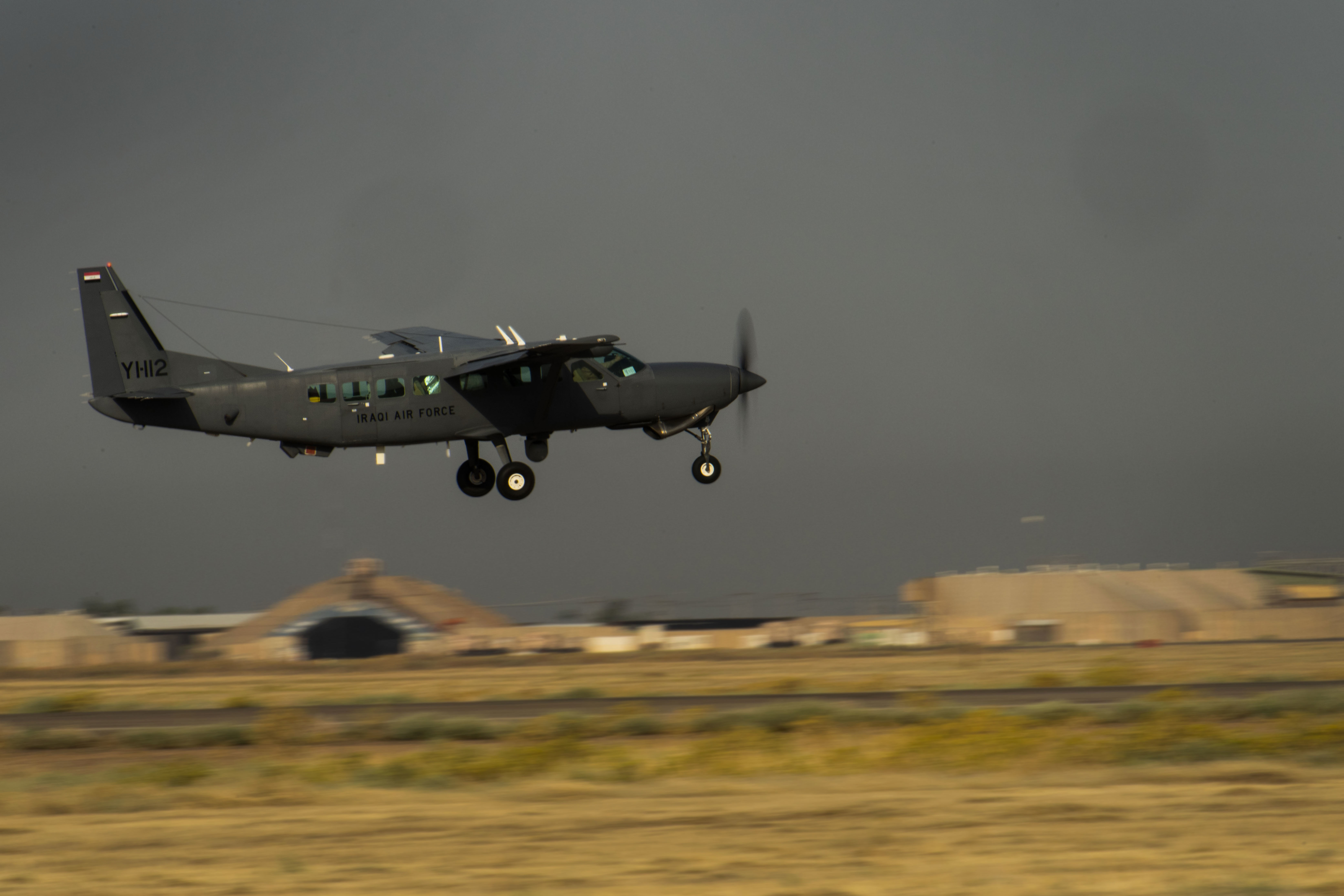
An Iraqi AC-208 Combat Caravan aircraft, assigned to Squadron 3, takes off prior to performing a Close Air Support Mission during Air Week at Balad Air Base, Iraq, June 15, 2019.

  - 1934 - established in October, flying Hawker Audaxes, called Nisrs by the Iraqis.
  - 1941 - flying Nisrs from Mosul.
  - 1942 - disbanded.
  - 1948 - re-established, flying de Havilland Doves.
  - 1951 - received Westland WS-51 Dragonfly helicopters.
  - 1953 - started receiving Bristol Freighters.
  - 1958 - Based at Rasheed Air Base. Operating de Havilland Doves, Bristol Freighters and de Havilland Herons that used to serve with the Royal Flight before the 14 July Revolution.
  - 1962 - started receiving Antonov An-12BPs. Was also operating Antonov An-2s and Freighters in this period.
  - 1964 - received Mil Mi-4s, operated as VIP transports.
  - 1965 - transferred its An-12s to the newly created No. 23 Squadron.
  - 1967 - flying Doves and Herons from Rasheed AB.
  - 1973 - flying Doves, Herons and Tupolev Tu-124s from Muthenna Air Base.
  - 1980 - flying Lockheed JetStars and Dassault Falcon 20s from Muthenna Air Base.
  - 2003 - disbanded.
  - 2004 - recreated, flying the Comp Air 7SLX and the Bell 206 helicopter.
  - 2005 - declared operational in April. Started flying the SAMA CH2000 from Kirkuk Air Base.
  - 2008 - started flying the Cessna 208.
  - 2015 - flying Cessna 208s from Ali Air Base and Balad Air Base.
- No. 4 Squadron
  - 1937 - established in November, flying Gloster Gladiators.
  - 1958 - Hawker Fury F.1
  - 1965 - re-equipped with the Westland Wessex.
  - 1967 - flying the Wessex, based at Rasheed Air Base.
  - 1973 - based at Al-Hurriya Air Base, flying the Wessex and the Aérospatiale Alouette III.
  - 1980 - flying Alouette IIIs and Mil Mi-8s. Based at Muthenna Air Base.
  - 2005-06 - forming at Camp Taji, planned to receive Bell Huey II helicopters.
- No. 5 Squadron

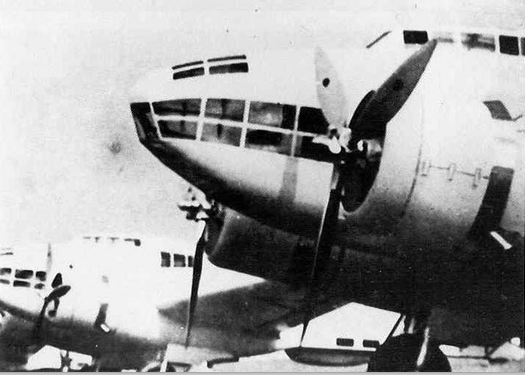
Savoia Marchetti SM.79Bs of the Iraqi Air force

  - 1938 - established at Rasheed AB, flying SM.79Bs and Breda Ba.65s.
  - 1941 - disbanded.
  - 1953 - declared operational on the de Havilland Vampire in August at Rasheed AB.
  - 1958 - flying de Havilland Venoms from Rasheed AB.
  - 1959 - declared operational on the Mikoyan-Gurevich MiG-17F in February.
  - 1965 - disbanded in December.
  - 1968 - re-established and declared operational on the Sukhoi Su-7BMK in November.
  - 1973 - based at Al Hurriya Air Base. Deployed to Bley Air Base in Syria on 8 October.
  - 1978 - re-equipped with Sukhoi Su-22Ms.
  - 1981 - based at Firnas AB, near Mosul.
  - 1986 - flying Sukhoi Su-22M-2/M-3s from Ali Ibn Abu Talib Air Base.
- No. 6 Squadron
  - 1939 - established on 31 May at Rasheed Air Base, flying the SM.79Bs formerly operated by No. 5 Squadron.
  - 1941 - disbanded.
  - 1954 - reactivated, operating de Havilland Venom F.50s.
  - 1957 - started flying Hawker Hunter F.6s at Habbaniyah Air Base.
  - 1967 - flying the Hunter F.59 from Habbaniyah AB.
  - 1973 - transferred to Qwaysina Air Base in Egypt between 6 and 8 April, together with No. 29 Squadron. There, they were grouped into No. 66 Independent Squadron EAF, which participated in the October 1973 Arab-Israeli War.
  - 1974 - returned to Iraq.
  - 1991 - flying the MiG-29 from Tammuz AB.
  - 1995 - disbanded.
- No. 7 Squadron
  - 1940 - established at Rasheed Air Base, flying Northrop Model 8A-4s.
  - 1947 - started flying Hawker Fury F.1s from Rasheed AB.
  - 1958 - flying Fury F.1s from al-Hurriyah AB.
  - 1960 - re-equipped with MiG-17PFs.
  - 1967 - flying MiG-17F/PFs from al-Hurriya Air Base.
  - 1973 - deployed to Al-Dumayr Air Base on 8 October.
  - 1975 - disbanded.
- No. 8 Squadron
  - 1959 - established, flying Ilyushin Il-28s.
  - 1961 - operating Il-28s from Rasheed Air Base
  - 1973 - converted to the Sukhoi Su-7BMK, and started acting as an operational conversion unit for this type. Deployed to Al-Dumayr Air Base on 9 October.
  - 1980 - equipped with Su-7BMKs and Su-7UMs. Based at Abu Ubayda Air Base.
  - 1992 - disbanded.
- 9th Squadron

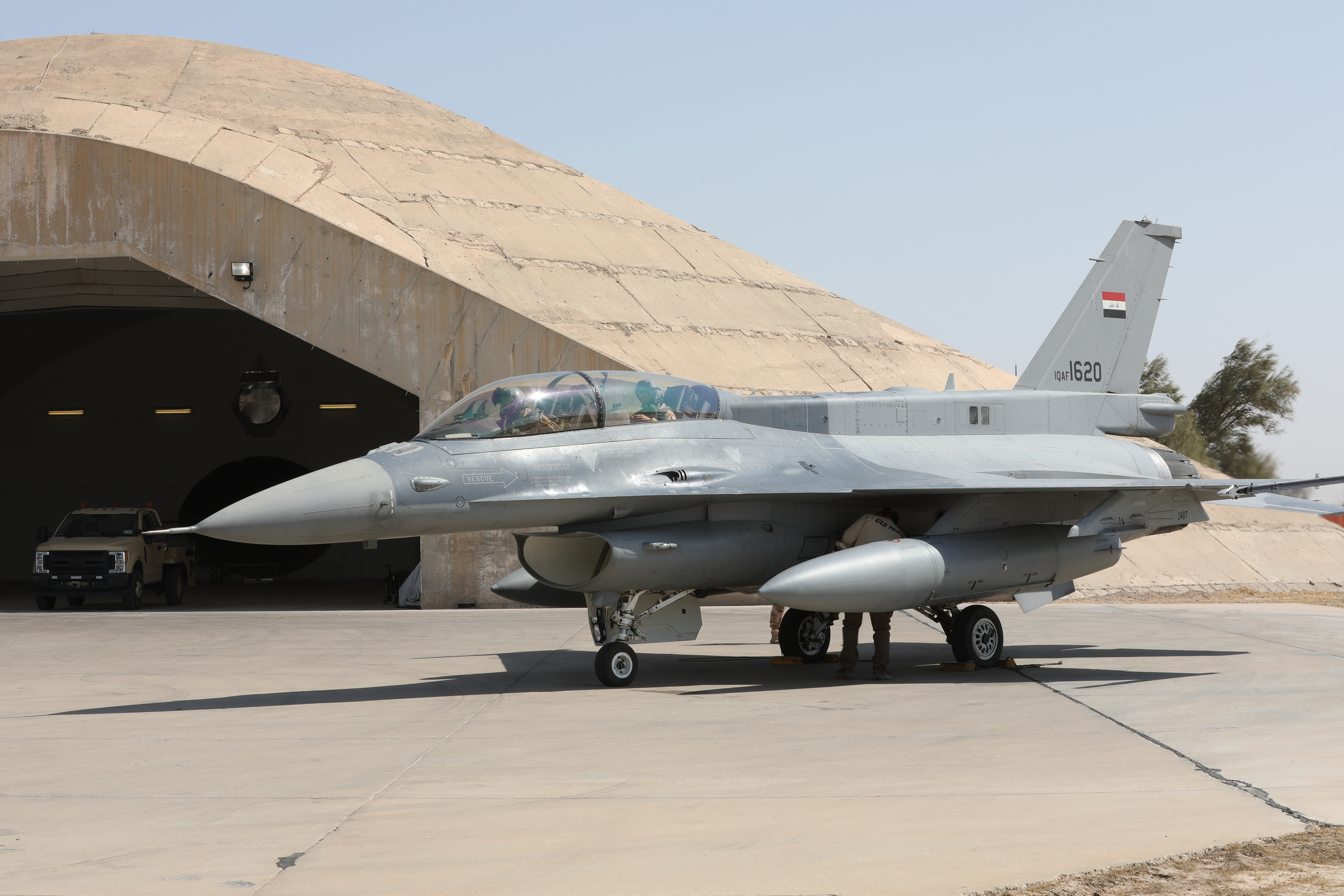
Iraqi Air Force F-16D

  - 1961 - declared operational on the Mikoyan-Gurevich MiG-19S in June.
  - 1967 - working up on the Mikoyan-Gurevich MiG-21.
  - 1973 - flying MiG-21PFMs from al-Wallid Air Base. Deployed to Al-Dumayr Air Base and Tsaykal Air Base on 8 October.
  - 1974 - converted to MiG-21MFs. Based at Rasheed Air Base.
  - 1980 - flying MiG-21MFs, based at Firnas Air Base near Mosul with a detachment at Abu Ubayda Air Base.
  - 1991 - still flying MiG-21MFs from Firnas AB.
  - 1995 - disbanded.
  - 2015 - recreated at Balad Air Base in July, flying the Lockheed Martin F-16.
- No. 10 Squadron

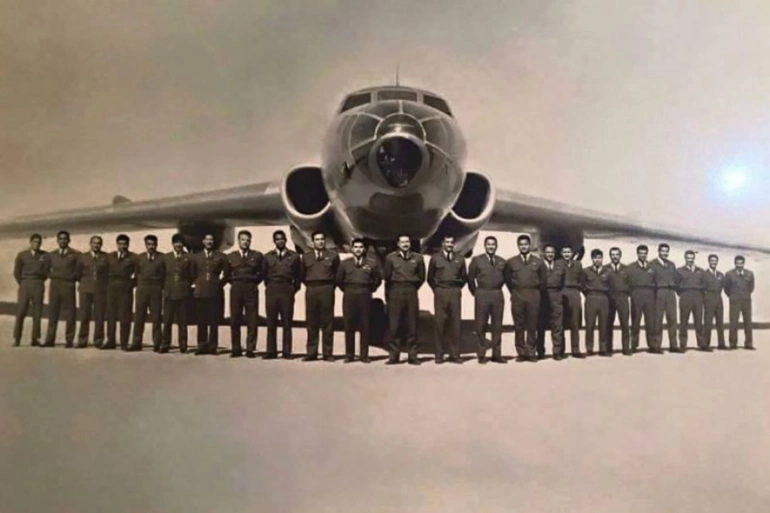
Airmen in front of one of No. 10 Squadron's Tu-16s in 1965

  - 1962 - established, operating the Tupolev Tu-16.
  - 1967 - flying Tu-16s, based at Al-Taqaddum Air Base.
  - 1980 - still flying Tu-16s at Al-Taqaddum.
  - 1987 - declared operational on the Xian H-6D in December.
  - 1992 - disbanded.
- No. 11 Squadron
  - 1962 - Mikoyan-Gurevich MiG-21F-13. Based at Al-Taqaddum AB.
  - 1972 - re-equipped with MiG-21MFs.
  - 1973 - based at Rasheed Air Base. Deployed to Nassiriya Air Base, in Syria, on 12 October.
  - 1991 - flying the MiG-21MF from Wahda AB near Basra.
  - 1995 - disbanded.
- 12th Squadron
  - 2005-06 - Bell Jet Ranger flying training operations at Camp Taji.
- No. 14 Squadron
  - 1966 - established, flying MiG-21FLs.
  - 1969 - re-equipped with MiG-21PFMs.
  - 1973 - based at Rasheed Air Base.
  - 1979 - started receiving MiG-21bis. Based at Ali Ibn Abu Talib Air Base.
  - 1991 - flying the MiG-21bis from Ali Ibn Abu Talib Air Base.
  - 1995 - disbanded.
- No. 17 Squadron
  - 1966 - established in January at Rasheed Air Base, flying MiG-21s.
  - 1967 - acting as MiG-21 operational conversion unit from Al-Taqaddum Air Base, flying MiG-21FL/PFMs.
  - 1973 - flying MiG-21FLs and MiG-21UM trainers from Rasheed AB.
  - 1980 - converted into an operational unit, flying MiG-21FL/UMs. Based at Sahra Air Base. Redeployed to Abu Ubayda Air Base in November.
  - 1995 - disbanded.
- No. 18 Squadron
  - 1973 - established at Al-Taqaddum Air Base. Received six Tupolev Tu-22 bombers and one Tu-22U trainer.
- No. 21 OCU
  - 1980 - established. Helicopter pilot training unit based at Sahra Air Base, equipped with Aerospatiale Gazelles.
- 23rd Squadron
  - 1965 - established at Muthenna Air Base, flying Antonov An-12s.
  - 1973 - based at Rasheed Air Base, operating An-12s, Antonov An-2s, and Bristol Freighters.
  - 1980 - operating Antonov An-12s and Antonov An-24s, still based at Rasheed AB.
  - 2005 - recreated at Ali Air Base in January, and received 3 ex-USAF C-130Es that same month.
  - 2006 - relocated to New Al Muthana Air Base in January.
  - 2013 - received six new C-130J-30s.
- No. 24 Squadron
  - 1973 - working up on the Mil Mi-6 at Rasheed Air Base.
  - 1980 - transferred to the Iraqi Army Aviation Corps.
- No. 27 OCU
  - 1980 - established as MiG-21 operational conversion unit at Rasheed Air Base in July, flying MiG-21FL/PFM/UMs. Redeployed to Sahra Air Base in September.
- No. 29 Squadron
  - 1965 - established at Habbaniya AB, flying Hawker Hunters.
  - 1973 - transferred to Qwaysina Air Base in Egypt between 6 and 8 April, together with No. 6 Squadron. There, they were grouped into No. 66 Independent Squadron EAF, which participated in the October 1973 Arab-Israeli War.
  - 1974 - returned to Iraq. Gave its remaining Hunters to No. 6 Squadron, and re-equipped with Mikoyan-Gurevich MiG-19s.
  - 1976 - re-equipped with Mikoyan-Gurevich MiG-23BNs, home-based at Ali Ibn Abu Talib AB.
  - 1990 - operating the MiG-23BN from Ali Ibn Abu Talib AB.
  - 1995 - disbanded.

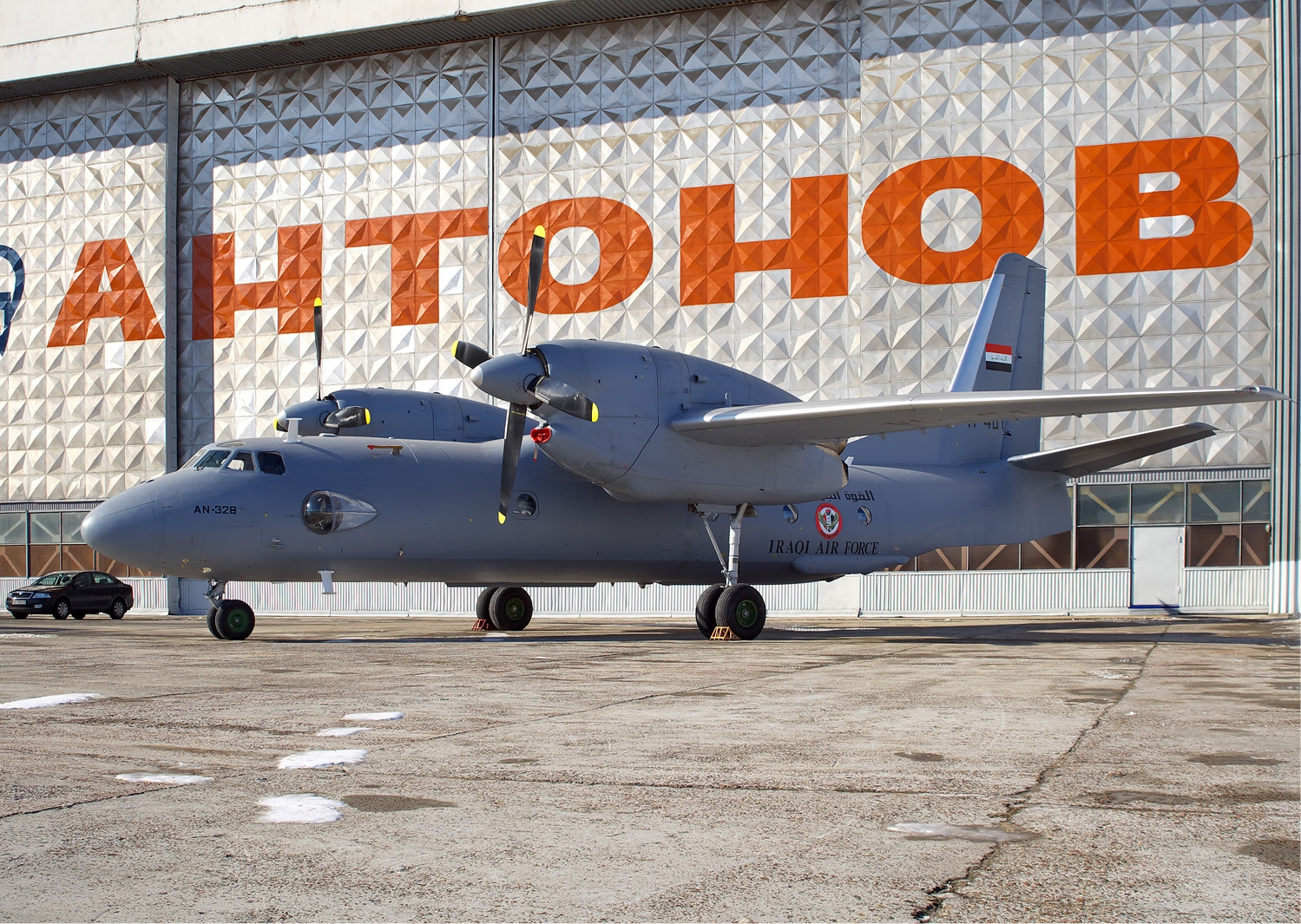
Iraqi Air Force Antonov An-32B

- 33rd Squadron
  - 1978 - established, flying Ilyushin Il-76MDs from Baghdad International Airport.
  - 2013 - recreated in May, flying six Antonov An-32Bs from New Al Muthana Air Base.
- No. 36 Squadron
  - 1975 - established at Al-Taqaddum Air Base, flying six Tupolev Tu-22 bombers and one Tu-22U trainer.
  - 1990 - disbanded.
- No. 37 Squadron
  - 1979 - established, flying the MiG-21bis from al-Hurriyah AB.
  - 1991 - flying the MiG-21bis from al-Hurriyah AB.
  - 1995 - disbanded.

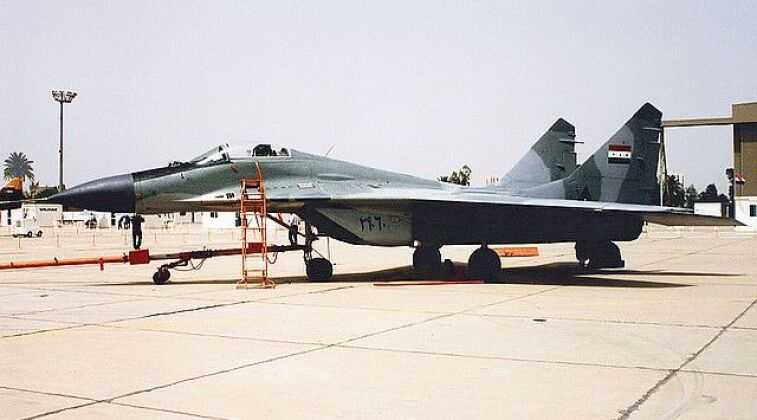
Iraqi Air Force MiG-29

- No. 39 Squadron
  - 1976 - declared operational on the Mikoyan-Gurevich MiG-23.
  - 1983 - disbanded and transferred its aircraft to No. 59 Operational Conversion Unit.
  - 1987 - re-established, flying MiG-29s.
  - 1995 - disbanded.
- No. 43 Squadron
  - 1979 - established, flying Il-76MDs from Baghdad International Airport.
- No. 44 Squadron
  - 1977 - established at al-Hurriya AB, flying Sukhoi Su-22s.
  - 1988 - flying Sukhoi Su-22s.
  - 1992 - disbanded.
- No. 47 Squadron
  - 1979 - established at al-Hurriyah AB, operating the MiG-21bis.
  - 1990 - redeployed to al-Wallid Air Base, still flying the MiG-21bis.
  - 1995 - disbanded.
- No. 49 Squadron
  - 1977 - established, flying the MiG-23BN. Based at Abu Ubayda Air Base.
  - 1990 - operating the MiG-23BN from Ali Ibn Abu Talib AB.
  - 1992 - disbanded.
- No. 53 Squadron - VIP transport unit, operating five Dassault Falcon 50s as of the mid-1980s.
- No. 59 OCU
  - 1974 - established as MiG-23 operational conversion unit, based at Al-Taqaddum Air Base.
  - 1992 - disbanded.
- No. 61 Squadron
  - 1978-1979 - established, flying the Mil Mi-25
  - 1980 - reassigned to the Iraqi Army Aviation Corps
- 62nd Squadron
  - 2015 - flying the Pilatus U-28A.
- No. 63 Squadron
  - 1985 - equipped with the Mikoyan-Gurevich MiG-23ML, based at Al-Bakr AB.
  - 1990 - operating MiG-23MLs from Al-Bakr AB.
- No. 66 Squadron
  - 1978-1979 - established, flying the Mil Mi-25
  - 1980 - reassigned to the Iraqi Army Aviation Corps
- No. 67 Squadron
  - 1980 - established at al-Bakr Air Base, working up on the MiG-23MF.
  - 1982 - achieved full operational capability.
  - 1990 - flying MiG-23MFs from Tammuz AB.
- No. 69 Squadron
  - 1986 - flying Sukhoi Su-22M-3s.
  - 1988 - flying Sukhoi Su-22s.
- 70th Squadron
  - 1973 - working up on MiG-21M/MFs at Rasheed Air Base.
  - 1976 - received four MiG-21R reconnaissance aircraft.
  - 2004 - recreated in September, flying Seabird Seekers from Basrah Air Base.
  - 2006-2007 - received SAMA CH2000s.
  - 2010 - relocated to Ali Air Base in October.
- No. 73 Squadron
  - 1984 - declared operational in July on the Mikoyan-Gurevich MiG-23ML at Ali Ibn Abu Talib AB.
  - 1990 - operating MiG-23MLs from Al-Bakr AB.
  - 2002 - operating from Habbaniya AB
- No. 79 Squadron
  - 1980 - established as No. 79 OCU.
  - 1981 - reorganised as No. 79 Squadron, and declared operational on the Dassault Mirage F1 at Saddam AB in September.
  - 1988 - still flying Mirage F1s.
  - 2003 - disbanded.
- No. 81 Squadron
  - 1984 - established at Saddam AB, flying Mirage F1s.
  - 1988 - still flying Mirage F1s.
  - 1991 - disbanded.
- 87th Squadron
  - 2007-2008 - started flying the Beechcraft King Air 350ER for reconnaissance, training and transport missions. Based at New Al Muthana Air Base.
- No. 89 Squadron
  - 1982 - established at Saddam AB in early 1982, flying Mirage F1s.
  - 1988 - still flying Mirage F1s.
- No. 91 Squadron
  - 1983 - established at Saddam AB in September, flying Mirage F1s.
  - 1988 - still flying Mirage F1s.
- No. 93 Squadron
  - 1986 - established at Al-Bakr AB, flying Mikoyan-Gurevich MiG-23MLs.
  - 1990 - operating MiG-23MLs from Al-Bakr AB.
  - 1995 - disbanded.
- No. 96 Squadron
  - 1984 - established.
  - 1991 - flying the MiG-25PD from Tammuz AB.
  - 2003 - disbanded.
- No. 97 Squadron
  - 1983 - equipped with MiG-25PDS.
  - 1991 - flying the MiG-25PDS from Qadisiyah Airbase.
- No. 101 Squadron
  - 1977 - established, flying Super Frelon helicopters.
  - 1980 - subordinated to the Iraqi Navy.
- 109th Squadron
  - 1978 - established at Wahda Air Base near Basra, flying Sukhoi Su-22s.
  - 1986 - flying the Sukhoi Su-22M-4K from Wahda AB.
  - 2002 - flying Sukhoi Su-25s from Habbaniyah.
  - 2003 - disbanded.
  - 2014 - recreated at New Al Muthana Air Base, flying Su-25s.
- 115th Squadron
  - 2015 - recreated at Balad Air Base in November, flying the Aero L-159 ALCA.
- 201st Squadron - training, re-designated from the 1st Training Squadron in 2011.
- 202nd Squadron
  - 2010 - started flying the Utva Lasta.
  - 2016 - flying the Utva Lasta from Ali Air Base.
- 203rd Squadron
  - 2011 - re-designated from the 3rd Training Squadron, flying the T-6A Texan II at the Tikrit Air Academy.
  - 2016 - flying T-6As from Ali Air Base.
- 204th Squadron - established in 2017, flying the KAI T-50.
