= 3rd Squadron (Iraq) =

3rd Squadron, Iraqi Air Force
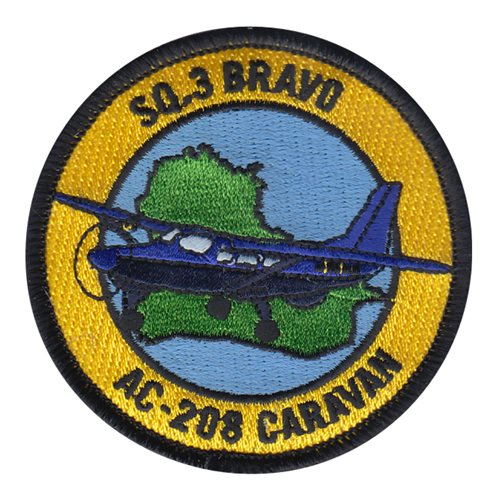
- Official 3rd Squadron patch
- Active: 1934-1942; 1948-2003; 2004-present
- Country: Iraq
- Branch: Iraqi Air Force
- Role: Attack; Reconnaissance
- Base: Ali Air Base; Balad Air Base

Insignia
- Fin Flash

Aircraft flown
- Attack: Cessna AC-208B
- Reconnaissance: Cessna RC-208B
- Trainer: Cessna TC-208B

The 3rd Attack and Reconnaissance Squadron is a squadron of the Iraqi Air Force.

== Pre-2003 era ==
No. 3 Squadron was first established in October 1934, operating Hawker Audax fighter/army cooperation aircraft from Rasheed Air Base in Baghdad. The squadron participated in its first combat operations during the 1935-1936 Iraqi Shia revolts, and lost one of its aircraft to machine-gun fire. At the time of the Anglo-Iraqi War, No. 3 Squadron was based in Mosul, but it did not fly any combat sorties during the war. However, in March 1942, Rasheed Air Base was suddenly flooded, and the squadron's remaining aircraft were destroyed. No. 3 Squadron was thus disbanded.

No. 3 Squadron was reestablished in early 1948, flying de Havilland Doves. In the 1950s, it also received three Bristol Freighters. In 1951, No. 3 Squadron received Iraq's first helicopters, three Westland Dragonflies. Later, the unit specialised in heavy and VIP transport: as of 1958, it was Doves, Freighters and de Havilland Herons from Rasheed Air Base. In the early 1960s, No. 3 Squadron received six Antonov An-12BPs. These were transferred to the newly created No. 23 Squadron in 1965. That same year, the squadron started operating Mil Mi-4s. On 5 June 1967, one of No. 3 Squadron's Doves was destroyed on the ground during an Israeli airstrike on H-3 Air Base.

As of October 1973, No. 3 Squadron was based at Muthenna Air Base, and flew two Doves, two Herons, and two Tupolev Tu-124s. Despite its specialisation in VIP transport, during the October War the squadron participated in the Iraqi air bridge to Egypt and Syria with its Herons and Tu-124s. As of September 1980, No. 3 Squadron operated Lockheed JetStars and Dassault Falcon 20s from Muthenna.

In 2002 the squadron was reported as flying An-24s and An-26s, but from Al-Bakr Air Base.

== Post-2003 era ==
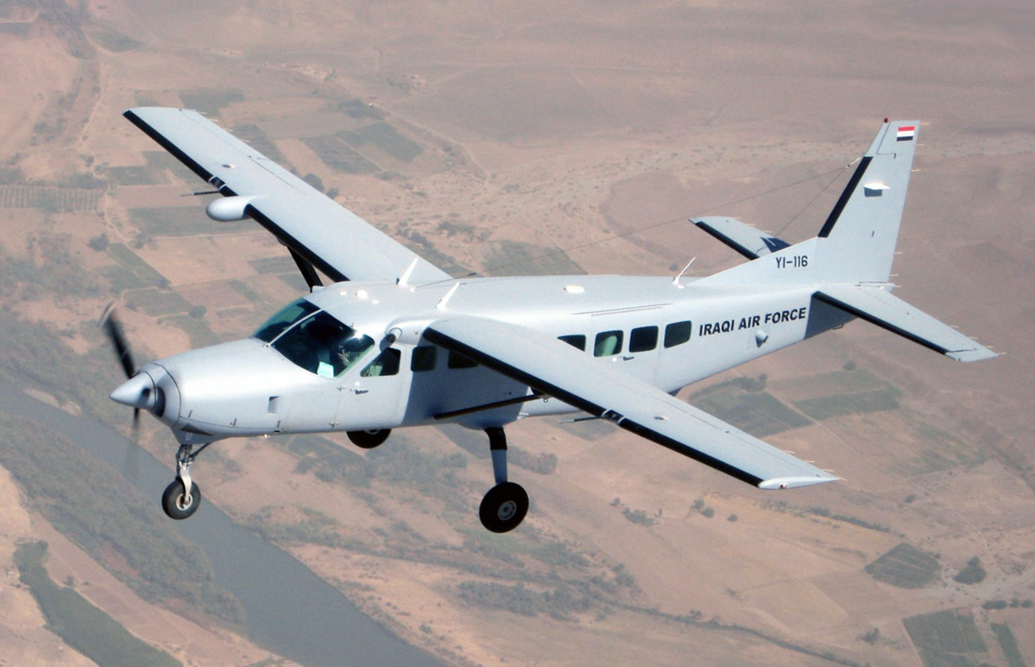
Iraqi Air Force Cessna TC-208B

The 3rd Squadron was recreated in 2004, and received six Comp Air 7SLs donated by the United Arab Emirates, starting in November 2004. These aircraft were equipped with a reconnaissance sensor suite. A month later, it started receiving Bell 206 helicopters. These were based at New Al Muthana Air Base. Subsequently, they were passed on to the Iraqi Army Aviation Corps. In April 2005, the squadron was declared operational. On 30 May, one of the 3rd Squadron's Comp Air 7SLs was the first aircraft lost by the post-2003 Iraqi Air Force, when it crashed near Jalawla. One Iraqi pilot and four American servicemen died in the crash. As a result, the whole fleet was grounded in January 2006. All of the Iraqi Comp Air 7SLs were withdrawn in late 2007. Meanwhile, in 2005-2006 the 3rd Squadron received four SAMA CH2000s at Kirkuk Air Base for reconnaissance and training tasks.

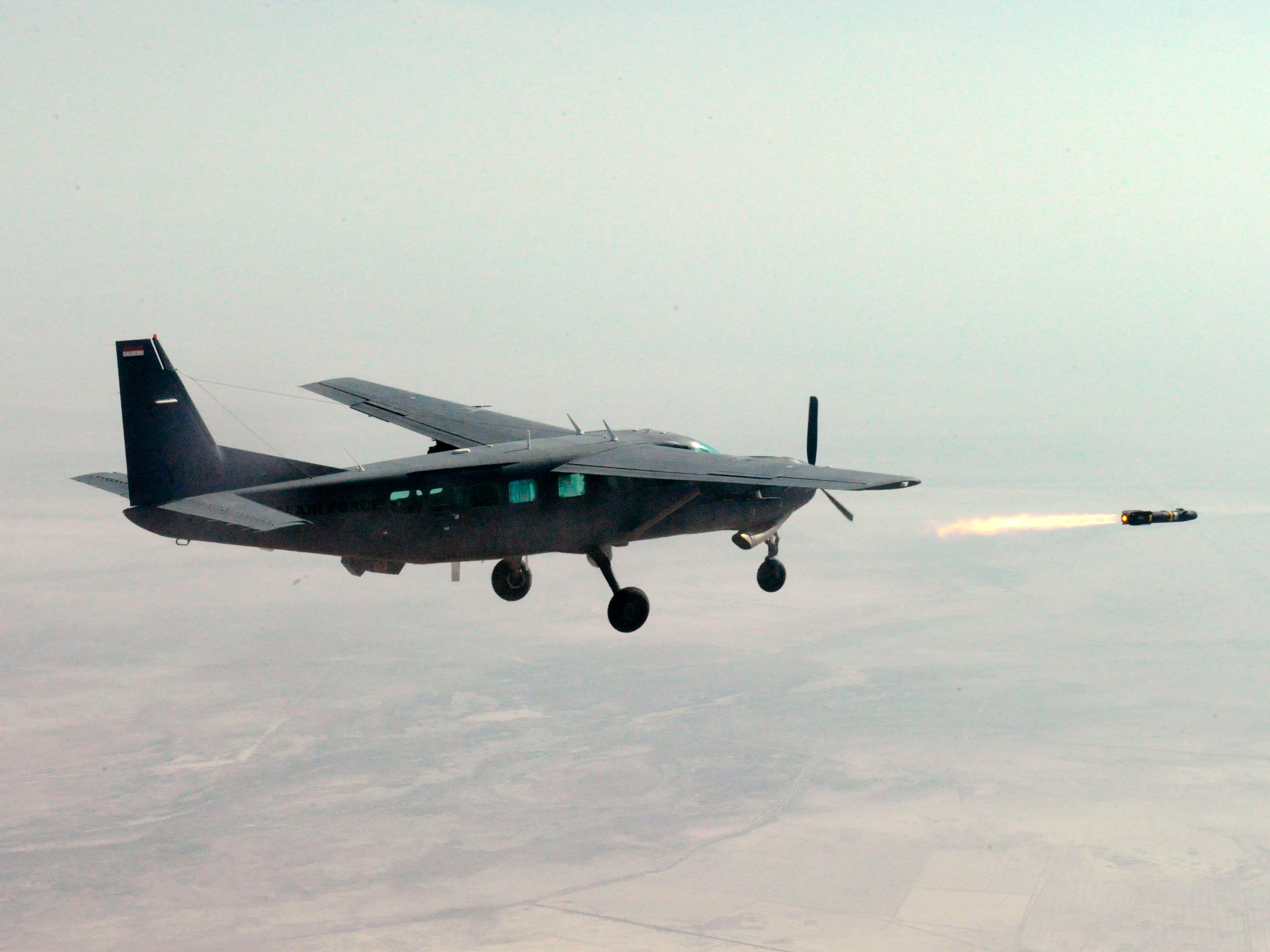
An AC-208 fires a Hellfire at a practice target

Starting in 2008, the 3rd Squadron received Cessna 208s in three different variants: the TC-208B for training, the RC-208B for ISR, and the AC-208B counterinsurgency attack aircraft. With the arrival of the Cessna 208s, the CH2000s were transferred to the 70th Squadron. After the delivery of the first AC-208Bs, the 3rd Squadron was renamed the 3rd Attack and Reconnaissance Squadron. The squadron's AC-208s were heavily used, including during combat operations: by the end of July 2015, they had launched more than 1,600 AGM-114 Hellfire missiles. On 16 March 2016, an AC-208B crashed near Hawija, killing its three crew members. Islamic State militants claimed they shot it down using a 57 mm anti-aircraft gun.
