= 23rd Squadron (Iraq) =

23rd Squadron, Iraqi Air Force
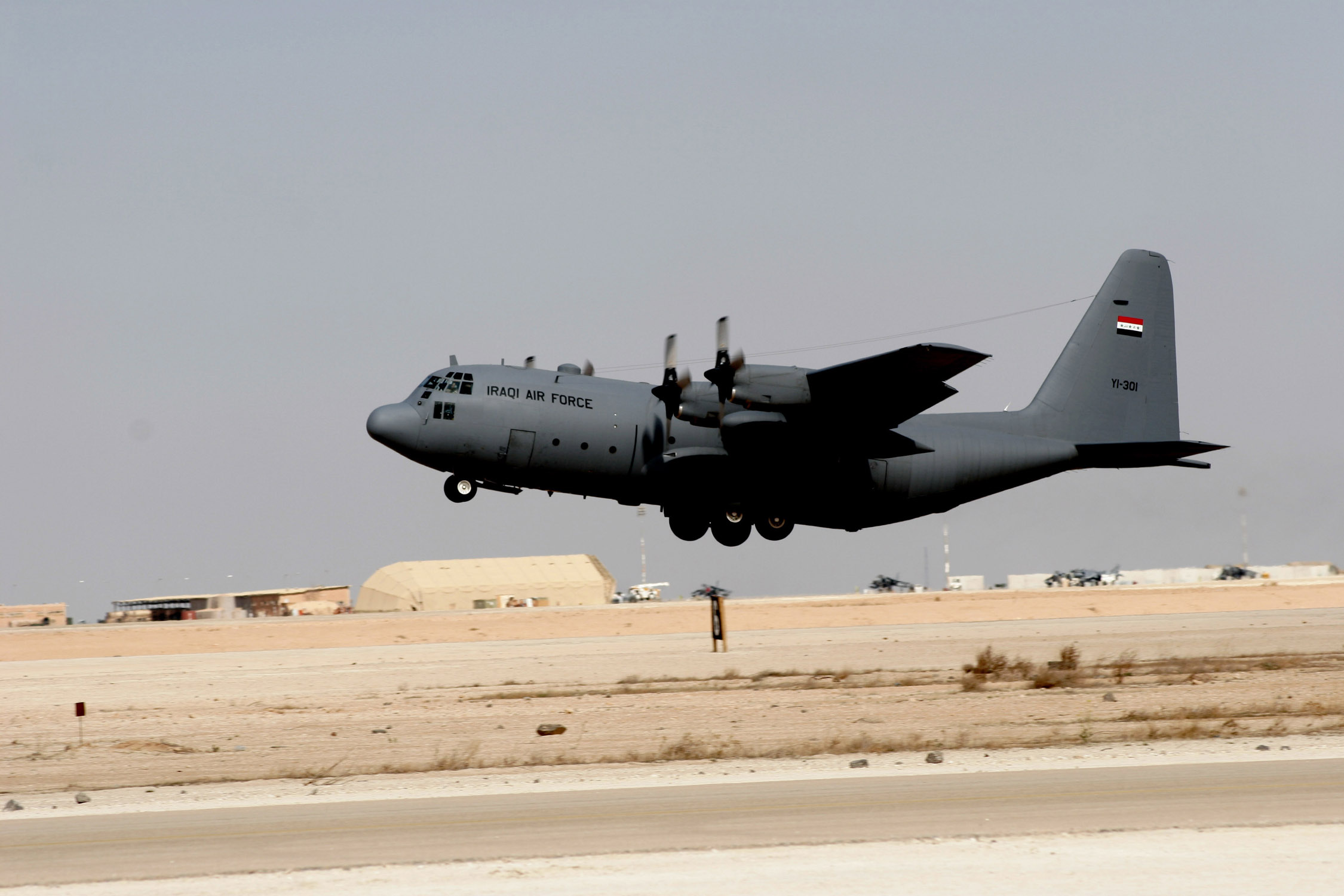
- A 23rd Squadron C-130E taking off from Al-Asad Airbase in 2005
- Active: 1965-? 2005-present
- Country: Iraq
- Branch: Iraqi Air Force
- Type: Transport
- Role: Air Transport
- Garrison/HQ: New Al Muthana Air Base (NAMAB)

Insignia
- Fin Flash

Aircraft flown
- Transport: Lockheed C-130 Hercules

The 23rd Squadron of the Iraqi Air Force is an air transport squadron operating the Lockheed C-130J Hercules.

== Pre-2003 era ==
No. 23 Squadron was established in 1965 at Muthenna Air Base. It was equipped with all of the Iraqi Air Force's Antonov An-12s, formerly operated by No. 3 Squadron. The establishment of the unit had the objective of supporting the quick intervention of loyal ground forces, in the event of a coup attempt. As of 1967, it was equipped with six Antonov An-12BPs and eight Antonov An-2s. One of the An-12s was destroyed on the ground on 5 June 1967, during an Israeli attack on H-3 Air Base. No. 23 Squadron participated in the First and Second Iraqi-Kurdish Wars, using its An-12s in transport roles and also as makeshift bombers, disgorging bombs from their rear loading ramps.

As the other Iraqi Air Force transport unit, No. 3 Squadron, became specialised in VIP transport, by 1973 No. 23 Squadron had taken up the three Bristol Freighters formerly operated by No. 3 Squadron. At that time, it was based at Rasheed Air Base. In April 1973, No. 23 Squadron supported the redeployment of two Hawker Hunter squadrons from Iraq to Egypt. During the October War, the whole Iraqi Air Force transport fleet was used at maximum capacity to support Iraqi, Egyptian and Syrian units. No. 23 Squadron was mostly involved in the transportation of personnel and spares for Iraqi units deployed in Syria and Egypt. In the mid-1970s, the Freighters were finally retired, and No. 23 Squadron partially re-equipped with Antonov An-24s. It also continued flying An-12s well into the 1980s.

== Post-2003 era ==
The squadron was reactivated in 2005 at Ali Air Base. It received three C-130Es formerly operated by the United States Air Force.

The squadron made the new air force’s first C-130 flight beyond Iraq "..during the first week of February (2005) when, under AST mentorship, a five-man crew flew from Ali AB to Amman. On 1 April one of the squadron's crews transported 51 Iraqi soldiers back to Iraq from an Emirati training site. This sortie established an administrative milestone of sorts because, in addition to flying the mission on their own, the crew was able to complete all the clearance forms, customs declarations, transit route applications, and other paperwork needed to travel through international airspace and land in a foreign country.

In July, the squadron "..conducted Operation Iraqi Power, the first operational airlift mission flown since the fall of the Hussein regime. This effort, mounted at the request of the Ministry of Electricity, was needed to protect Iraqi government power generation stations and distribution networks. The squadron had to palletize and move 2,700 assault rifles and a million rounds of ammunition from Baghdad to Basrah. After five days’ preparation, the squadron delivered the shipment in five "chalks" without incident. The operation also chalked up some other firsts, including the first time Iraqi loadmasters prepared airlift cargo without significant AST assistance and the first time that New Al Muthana Air Base (NAMAB) was used to stage an operational ..mission. This was a significant event, as NAMAB had already been proposed as the squadron's new ..location.. . Operation Iraqi Power would be the first in a series of familiarization movements designed to introduce the squadron and the base to one another over the next six months."

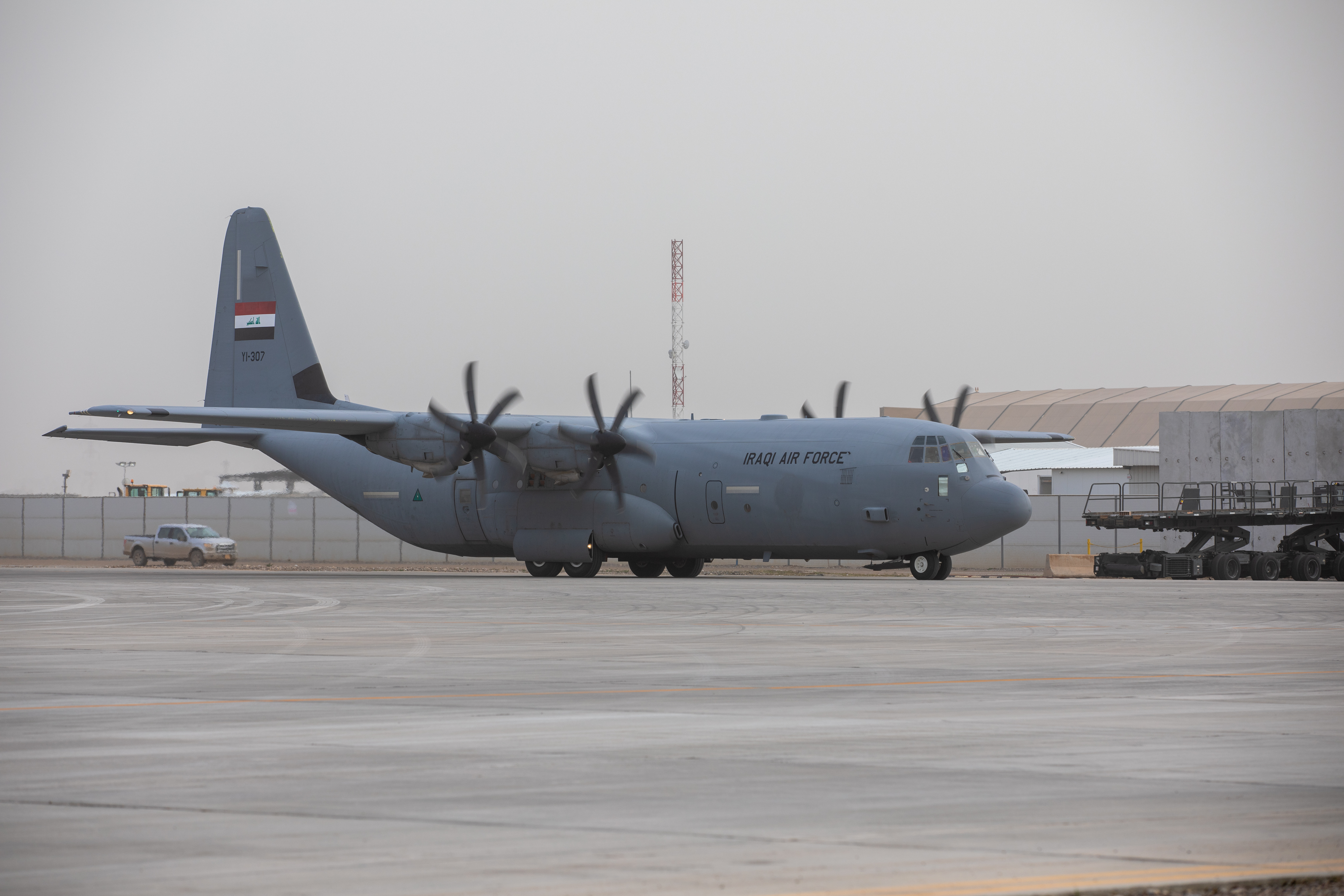
An Iraqi C-130J-30 in 2021

In January 2006, the 23rd Squadron moved to New al-Muthana Air Base. In September 2009, it began fully independent operations, as the USAF advisory mission was withdrawn. In 2012-2013, six C-130J-30s were received. In March 2015, a C-130J-30 dropped 10 tons of supplies for the Iraqi forces engaged in the Battle of Baiji.
