= 70th Squadron (Iraq) =

70th Squadron, Iraqi Air Force
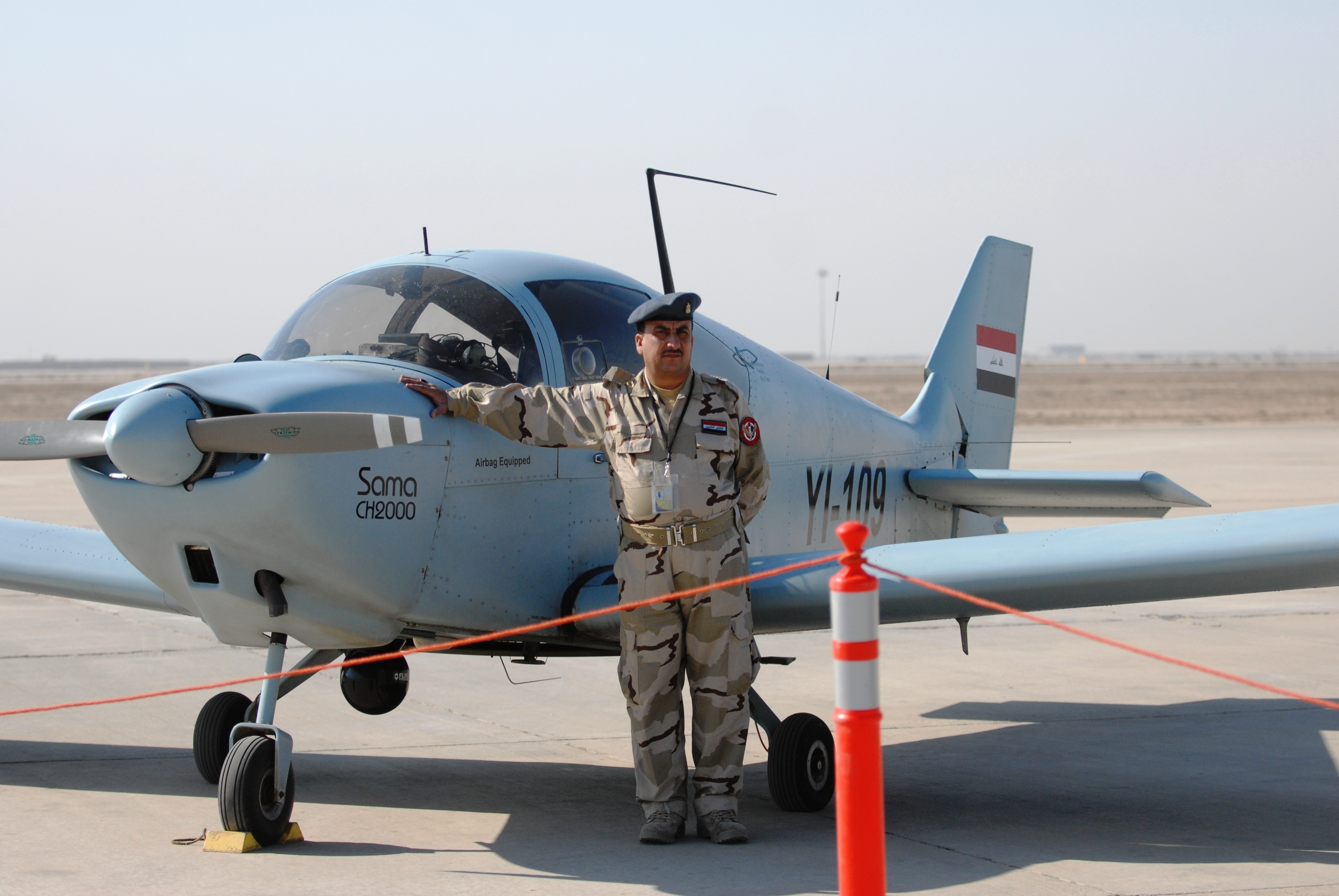
- An Iraqi Air Force pilot with one of the 70th Squadron's SAMA CH2000s
- Active: 1973–? July 2004 – present
- Country: Iraq
- Branch: Iraqi Air Force
- Role: Reconnaissance
- Size: 12 pilots and 26 engineers (2006)
- Base: Basra International Airport
- Engagements: Battle of Basra (2008)

Insignia
- Fin Flash

Aircraft flown
- Reconnaissance: 12 × CH2000

The 70th Squadron is one of the two reconnaissance squadrons of the Iraqi Air Force. As of 2016, it was based at Ali Air Base. The other reconnaissance unit is the 3rd Squadron based at Kirkuk Air Base.

== Pre-2003 era ==
No. 70 Squadron was established in 1973. At the time of the October War, it was working up on MiG-21M/MFs at Rasheed Air Base. Additionally, in 1976 the squadron received four MiG-21R reconnaissance fighters. These were operated by a dedicated flight. During the period between their arrival and the beginning of the Iran–Iraq War, these aircraft flew reconnaissance missions near the border with Iran. These missions were intensified starting in April 1980, but were performed by single aircraft only, staying inside Iraqi airspace. This changed in early June, when two MiG-21Rs deliberately violated Iranian airspace while conducting photo reconnaissance. The MiG-21Rs from No. 70 Squadron performed dozens more such missions inside Iran without getting caught, until 11 September. That day, a MiG-21R was shot down by an F-14 Tomcat, using an AIM-54 Phoenix missile.

== Post-2003 era ==
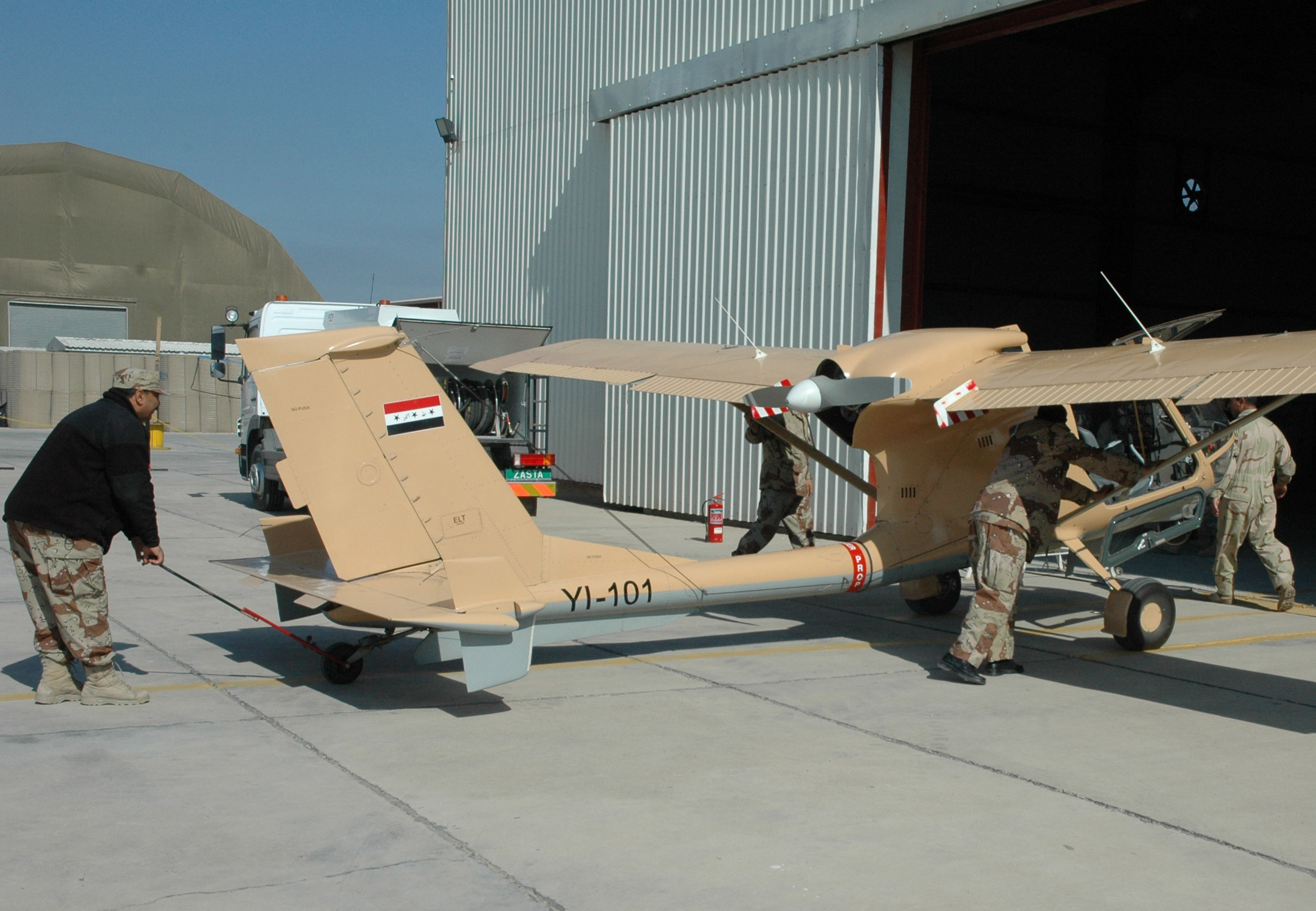
Iraqi Airmen from Squadron 70 recover one of two Seeker aircraft after a mission at Basra Air Base

The squadron was reformed in July 2004. In August 2004, nine pilots and five engineers began operations, having been trained in Jordan on Seabird Seekers. The two Seekers that were assigned to the 70th Squadron were the first aircraft to enter service with the reformed Iraqi Air Force; at that time, the squadron was based at Basrah. To assist the squadron had four coalition pilot instructors, one engineer instructor, and a systems instructor. The 70th Squadron's missions included monitoring supply routes and oil pipelines susceptible of being targeted by insurgents.

In addition to its two Seabird Seekers, the 70th Squadron received four SAMA CH2000s in 2006–2007. In 2008, Cessna 208s were delivered to the other Iraqi Air Force reconnaissance unit, the 3rd Squadron. These replaced the CH2000s formerly operated by that unit, which passed them on to the 70th Squadron. In October 2010, the 70th Squadron relocated to Ali Air Base.

During the Iraqi Army offensive against the Mahdi Army in March 2008, the squadron flew 53 missions over Basra, providing 91 hours of intelligence and reconnaissance to Iraqi Army forces on the ground, including information about enemy troop concentration and bomb damage assessments.
