= Nasiriyah Airport =

Iraqi air base

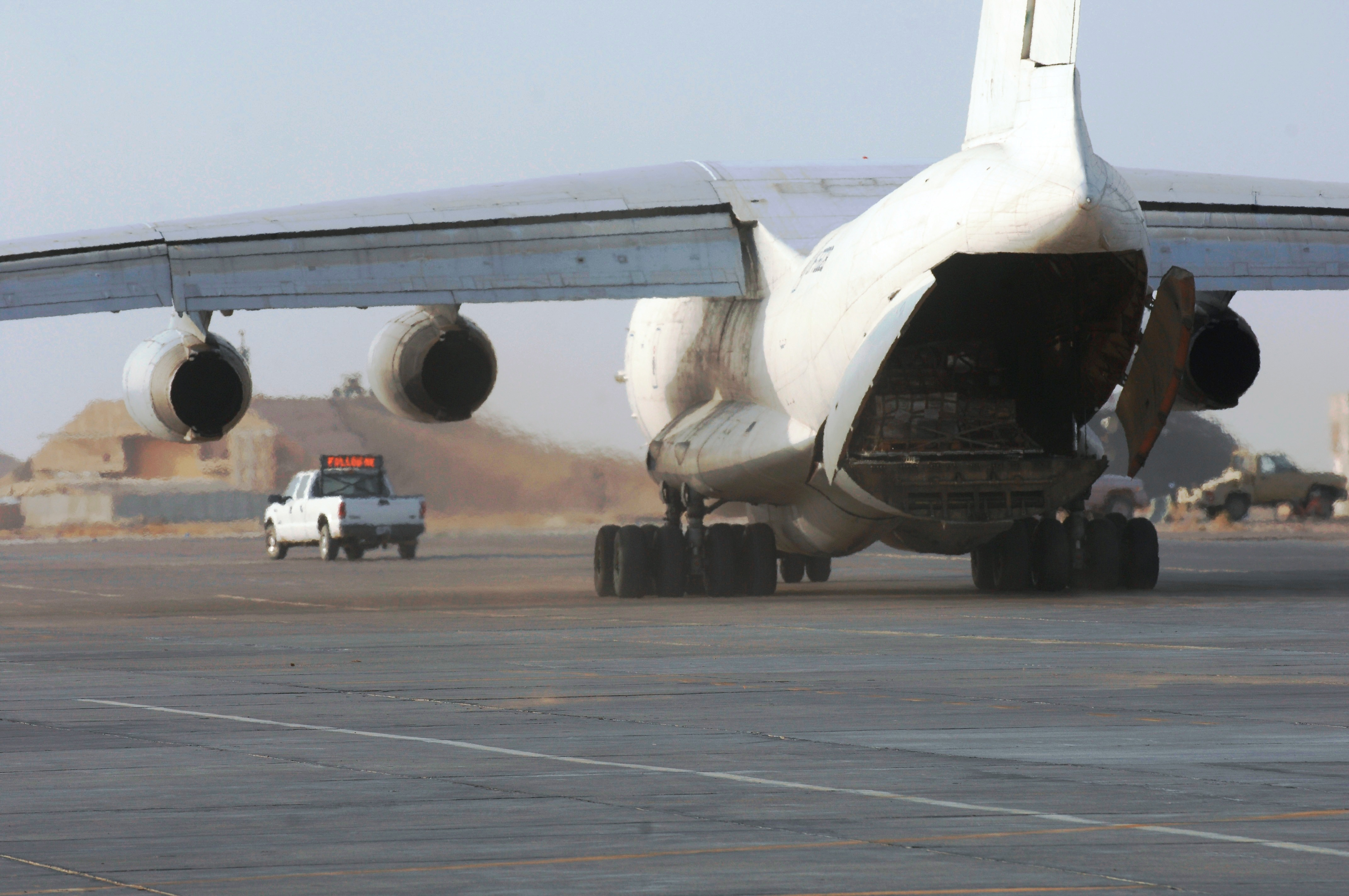
- An Ilyushin Il-76 cargo aircraft at the base in 2007
- IATA: XNH; ICAO: ORTL; LID: TAL

Summary
- Airport type: Public / Military
- Operator: Iraqi Airways / Iraqi Air Force
- Serves: Nasiriyah
- Hub for: Iraqi Airways
- Elevation AMSL: 20 ft / 6 m
- Coordinates: 30°56′23″N 046°05′33″E

Map
- Location in Iraq

Runways
Direction	Length		Surface
Direction	ft	m	Surface
12L/30R	10,935	3,333	Concrete
12R/30L	9,991	3,045	Concrete
- no ILS

Nasiriyah Airport (IATA: XNH, ICAO: ORTL) is a public and military airport located 23 km (14 mi) southwest of Nasiriyah, Iraq.

It is also known as Tallil Air Base until December 2011 and Imam Ali Air Base until March 2017, when the base was used by United States Armed Forces. It is generally known as Camp Adder by the U.S. Army; the name Ali Air Base is used chiefly by the U.S. Air Force; the installation, however, is still commonly referred to as "Tallil".

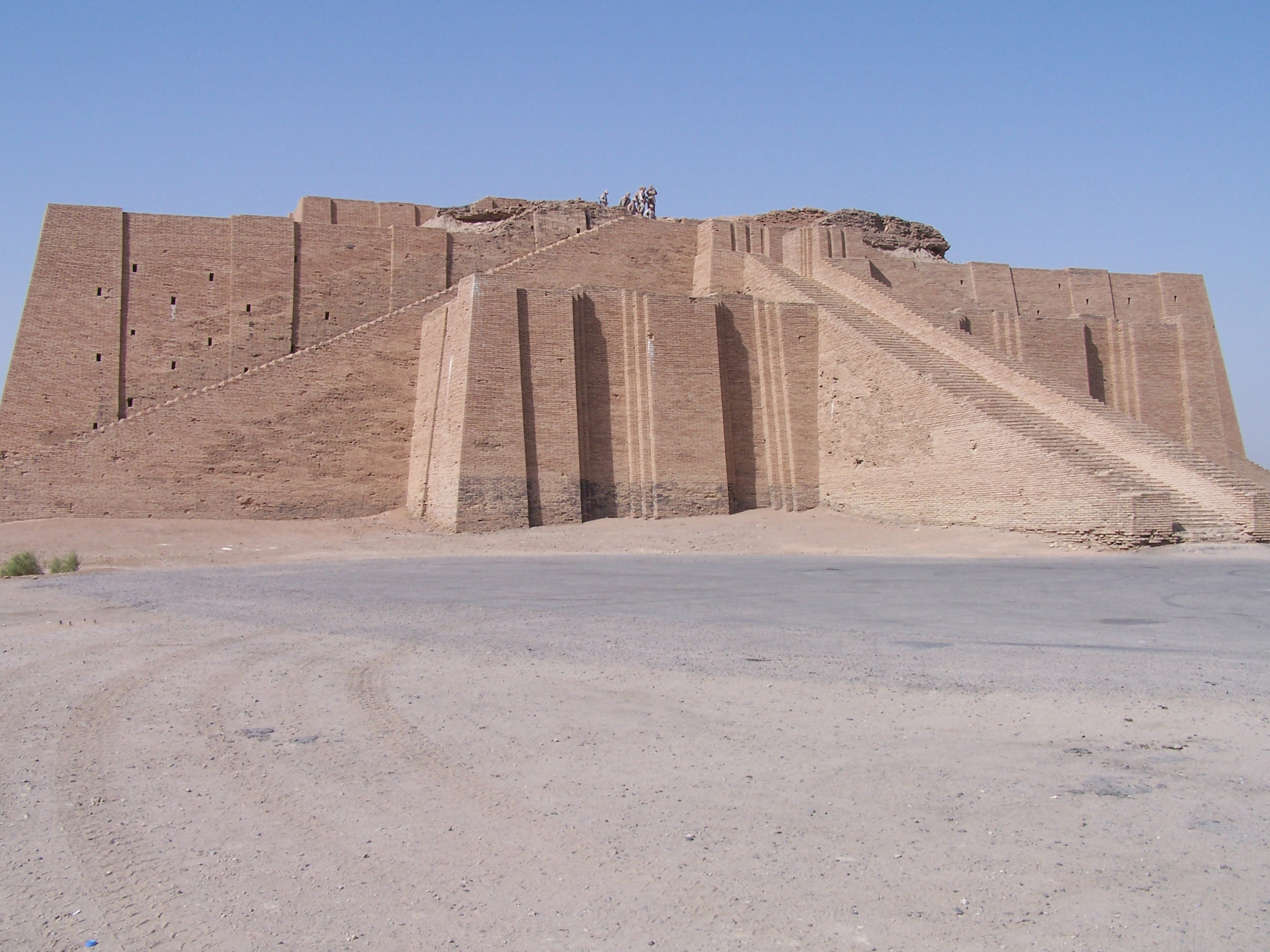
The Ziggurat of Ur is within the perimeter of the base

The base occupies 30 km^{2} (11.6 sq mi) and is protected by 22 km (13.7 mi) of security perimeter. The ancient Babylonian city of Ur, one of the places identified as Ur of the Chaldees, the birthplace of Abraham, is located within the security perimeter of Ali Base, and its ancient ziggurat is visible from nearly every corner of the base.

== Military use ==
=== Iraqi Air Force ===
Tallil Air Base was an Iraqi Air Force base. The airbase was bombed in Operation Kaman 99 on the second day of the Iran–Iraq War, just after the Iraqi invasion of Iran.

The air base served as the home of a unit of Soviet-built MiG fighter aircraft as well as several Mi-24D (Hind-D) helicopter gunships. The aircraft could be serviced and stored in fortified concrete aircraft hangars located at either end of the main runway. These aircraft shelters, sometimes referred to as "trapezoids" or "Yugos", were built by Yugoslavian contractors sometime prior to 1985, and according to the Gulf War Air Power Survey, there were a total of 36 aircraft shelters in 1991.

It is possible that Sukhoi Su-20s may have been located at the base at some point during this period.

=== Gulf War ===
During the Gulf War, the base and its fortified aircraft shelters were heavily damaged by Coalition bombing missions. After the ground campaign began, elements of the U.S. Army 24th Infantry Division (Mechanized) took the base after fierce opposition from an entrenched force of the Iraqi 37th and 45th Infantry Divisions. After the initial engagement and defeat of enemy forces the 24th ID required a security force to continue to hold this piece of key terrain. The original plan was for elements of the 101st Airborne Division (Air Assault) to take up this position. However, with those elements being engaged further to the west this wasn't possible for several hours. It was later turned over to the 82nd Airborne Division of the U.S. Army. While the initial forces had been dealt with by the 24th ID (Mech) pockets of light resistance still remained and would mount small attacks. The original plan for Tallil was that it would be used as a resupply point for coalition forces. Therefore, it was vital for the 82nd to hold this until reinforcements could be brought up to help maintain the security of this very large airfield. U.S. Combat Engineers continued to destroy whatever serviceable aircraft and ordnance was missed during the earlier air campaign.

=== Iraq War 2003-11 ===
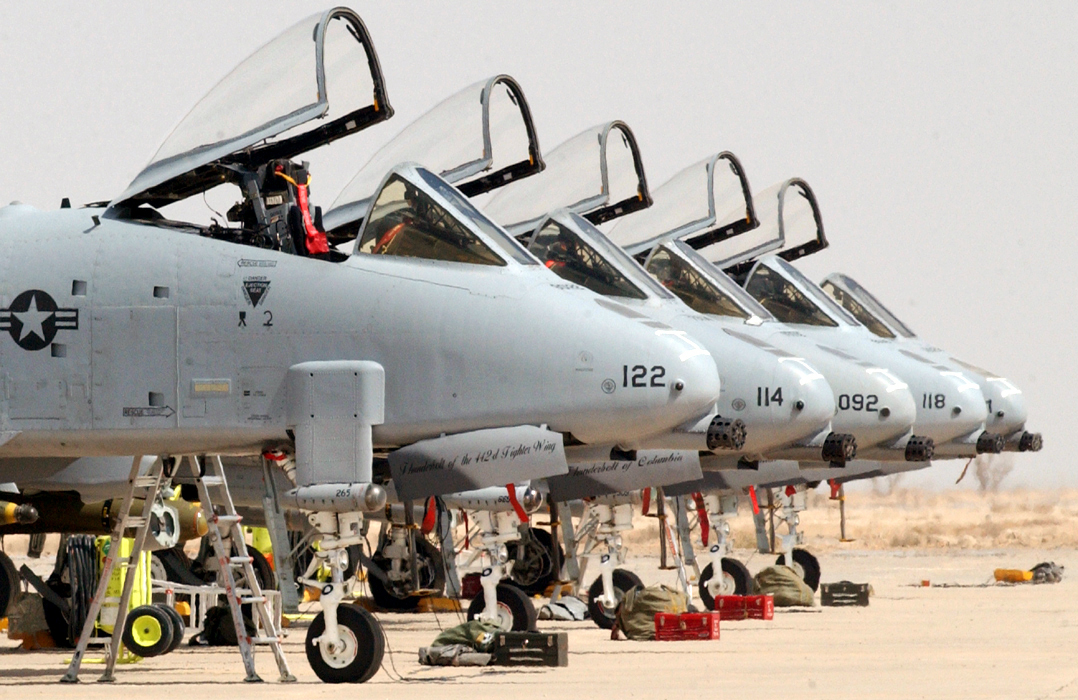
US A-10 Thunderbolt IIs from the 442nd Fighter Wing, at the base in 2003

After the start of the Iraq War in 2003, Tallil, now known as Ali Air Base, was used by the U.S. Air Force 332d Air Expeditionary Wing before they moved to Balad Air Base in January 2004. The 726th Maintenance Battalion (Massachusetts) arrived in May 2003 to operate as the Mayor cell for LSA (Logistics Support Area) Adder. The 407th Air Expeditionary Group, operating C-130 Hercules cargo airplanes, then utilized the base and trained more than 100 Iraqi Airmen on how to maintain and fly the C-130 type until February 2006. These trainees were then designated the Iraqi Air Force 23rd Squadron and relocated to Kirkuk Air Base.

Units from various coalition groups have used designated sections of Ali Air Base during the course of the occupation. Camp Terendak was used by Australian troops until the Australian Battlegroup withdrawal on June 1, 2008. Romanian troops used Camp Dracula until the Romanian Army withdrew in early June 2009. Camp Dracula was then used as the "Regional Center of Excellence for Civil Capacity".

Ali Air Base was thereafter used primarily by U.S. forces, including elements of the U.S. Army, Air Force, the Navy, and the Marine Corps. Camp Adder, used by the Army, was also the home to three Provincial Reconstruction Teams for the provinces of Dhi Qar, Muthanna, and Maysan. The Dhi Qar team was led by Italian personnel, while the Muthanna and Maysan teams were headed by U.S. State Department officers. The U.S. Army Corps of Engineers Gulf Region District managed these and most other construction projects, from start to finish, 34 Field Squadron (Air Support), Royal Engineers, built accommodation and repaired the runways to make them operational for use by the U.S. Air Force during the Iraq War.

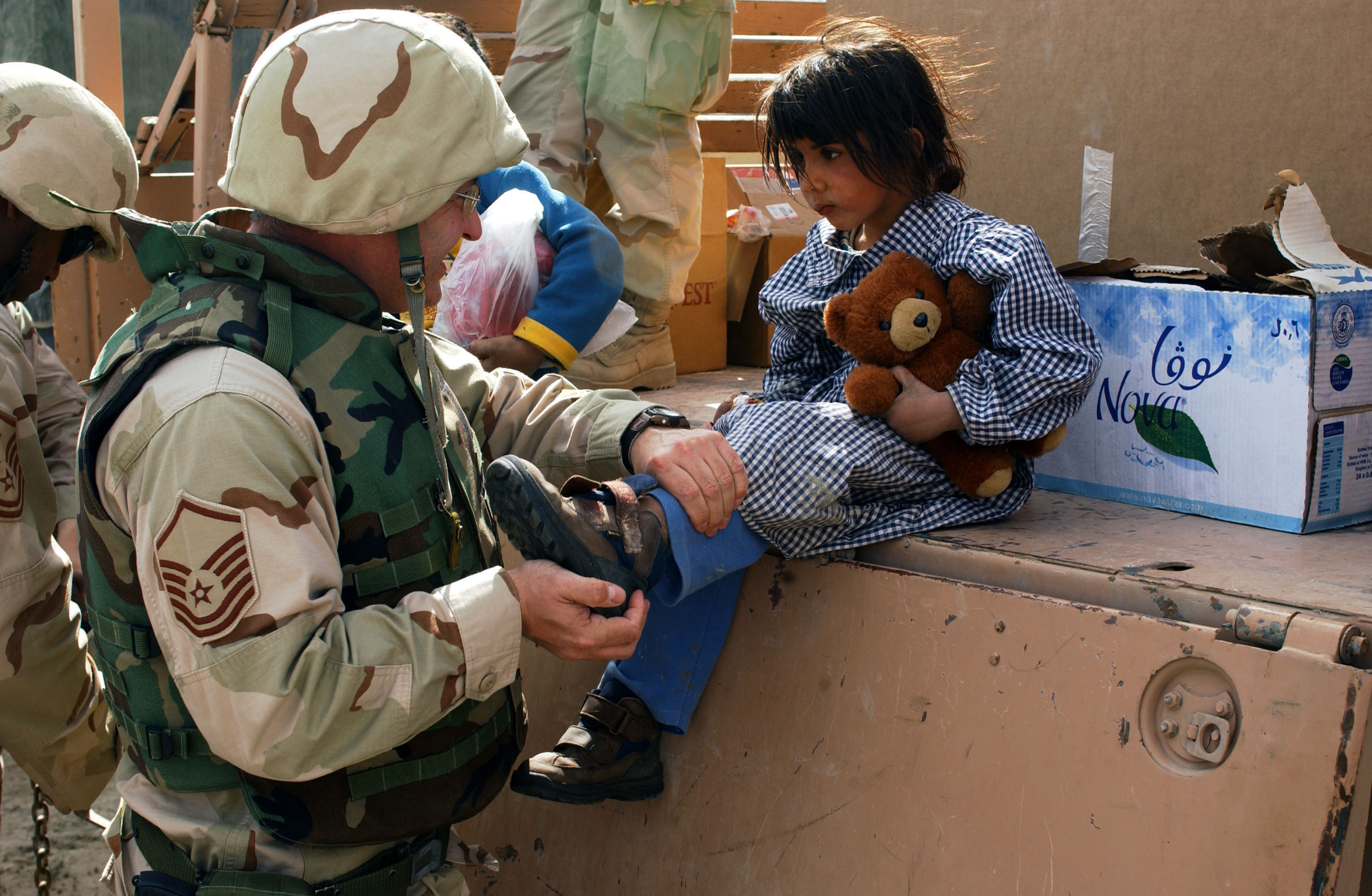
A US airman fits a new pair of shoes on a young Bedouin girl in a village near Tallil Air Base, 2005

The base was nearly vacated of all U.S. Forces on 16 December 2011. The 20th Engineer Brigade, serving as the COB Adder Mayor Cell and Theatre Engineer Brigade, led and managed the transition of the final US base in Iraq. The 77th Theater Aviation Brigade, redesignated as the 77th Combat Aviation Brigade for the deployment, was the last aviation brigade to start and finish its mission in Iraq and departed in December 2011. The closure of this base and the later movement of the remaining US Forces to Kuwait were the final actions in Operation New Dawn, the successor mission to Operation Iraqi Freedom.

== Amenities ==
While the U.S. military used the base during the Iraq War (2003–2011), there were various amenities for the troops stationed there, such as a large post exchange and restaurants such as Pizza Hut, Burger King, Taco Bell, Ciano's and a Green Beans coffee shop, but these were closed as of October 7, 2011. Three dining facilities operated by KBR provided hot food for the troops, U.S. government civilians and contractors working on the base; they also closed and MRE's were the only option for food. The base also boasted a large chapel and a Morale, Welfare and Recreation (MWR) facility. A private contractor, SniperHill, provided commercial internet service but the highest speed available was 256k at a cost of $110 per month.

Most Army personnel living on the installation lived in containerized housing units, affectionately known as CHU's, as opposed to conventional tent quarters. There were, however, at least several Army units, as well as all USAF personnel, that occupied tents on the base, as well as the buildings that were not destroyed after The Gulf War.

== Camp Whitehorse ==
Camp Whitehorse was a small prison, run by the United States Marine Corps, near Tallil Airbase outside of Nasiriyah.

Abuse incidents that have occurred at Camp Whitehorse include:

Nagem Hatab
50-10 technique
beating death
stress position
- Camp staff believed that Hatab had a role in the capture of Jessica Lynch.
- Guards testified that they were to force inmates to stand for fifty minutes of the hour, for ten hours per day.

== Operation Night Harvest ==
Operation Night Harvest was the uncovering of abandoned aircraft at Tallil AB. United States forces found a large junkyard of derelict Iraqi aircraft.

== Civilian use ==
The airfield is served by two main runways measuring 12,000 and 9,700 feet. A modern air traffic control tower was completed in March 2010 to further increase the airfield's capabilities. An instrument landing system was installed to provide CAT 1 service to the 30R approach and was planned to be operational by the end of April 2010. The airfield lighting system was also upgraded as part of the airfield modernization program.

== Airlines and destinations ==
Previously, the airport served scheduled domestic flights to Baghdad, Basra and Najaf, and it also served international flights to Iran, which were operated by Iraqi Airways.

== See also ==
- Khamisiyah
- List of United States Military installations in Iraq

== Notes ==
1. Tallil Airbase, Global Security
2. Marine Guilty Of Prison Abuse, CBS News, September 2, 2004
3. Intelligence Agents Accused in Abuse: U.S. Guards Accuse Military Intelligence Operatives of Encouraging Abuse in 4 Iraq Prisons, mirrored Associated Press, May 29, 2004
