= 2003 invasion of Iraq order of battle =

Order of battle

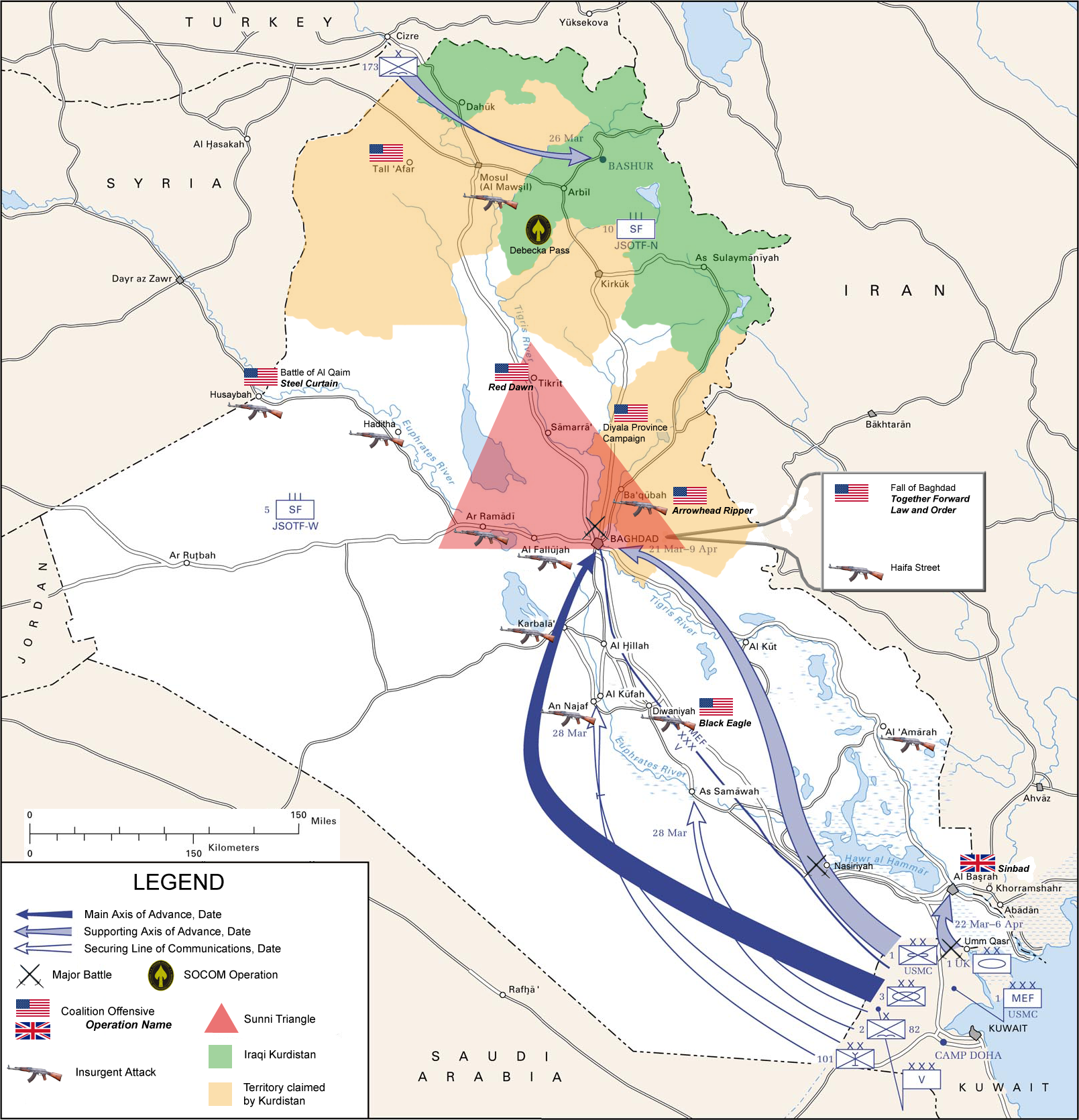
Invasion routes and major battles fought by the coalition and afterwards

This is the order of battle for the invasion of Iraq during the Iraq War between coalition forces and the Iraqi Armed Forces; Fedayeen Saddam irregulars; and others between March 20 and May 1, 2003.

The United States Army has defined an "order of battle" as the "identification and command structure" of a unit or formation. Operation Iraqi Freedom force organization changed frequently.

In the listings below "BN" refers to a battalion, a military unit. In the United States and United Kingdom, a combat battalion is usually approximately 600-800 personnel strong.

== Coalition Forces Land Component Command ==
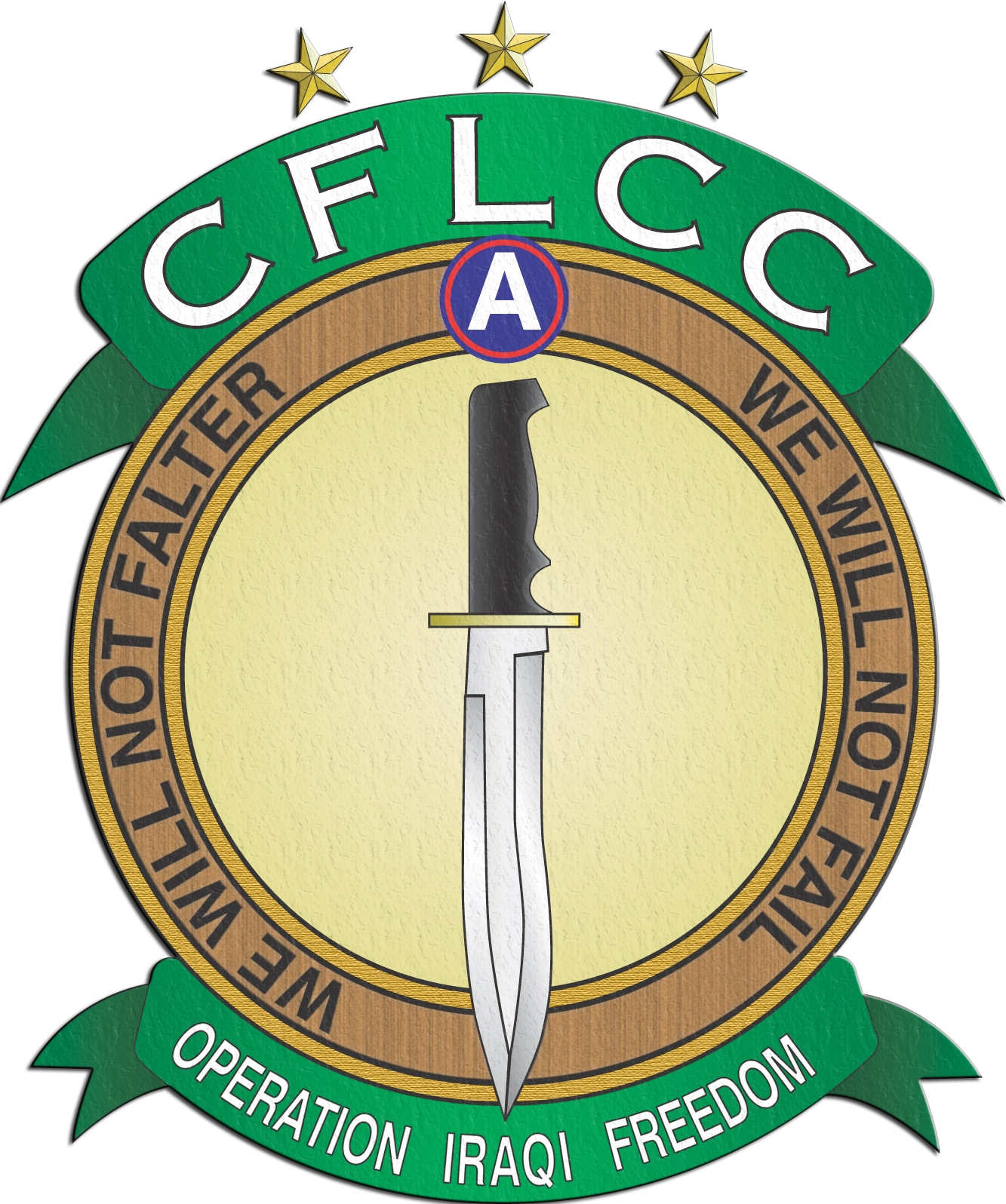
Emblem of the Coalition Forces Land Component Command during the Iraq War

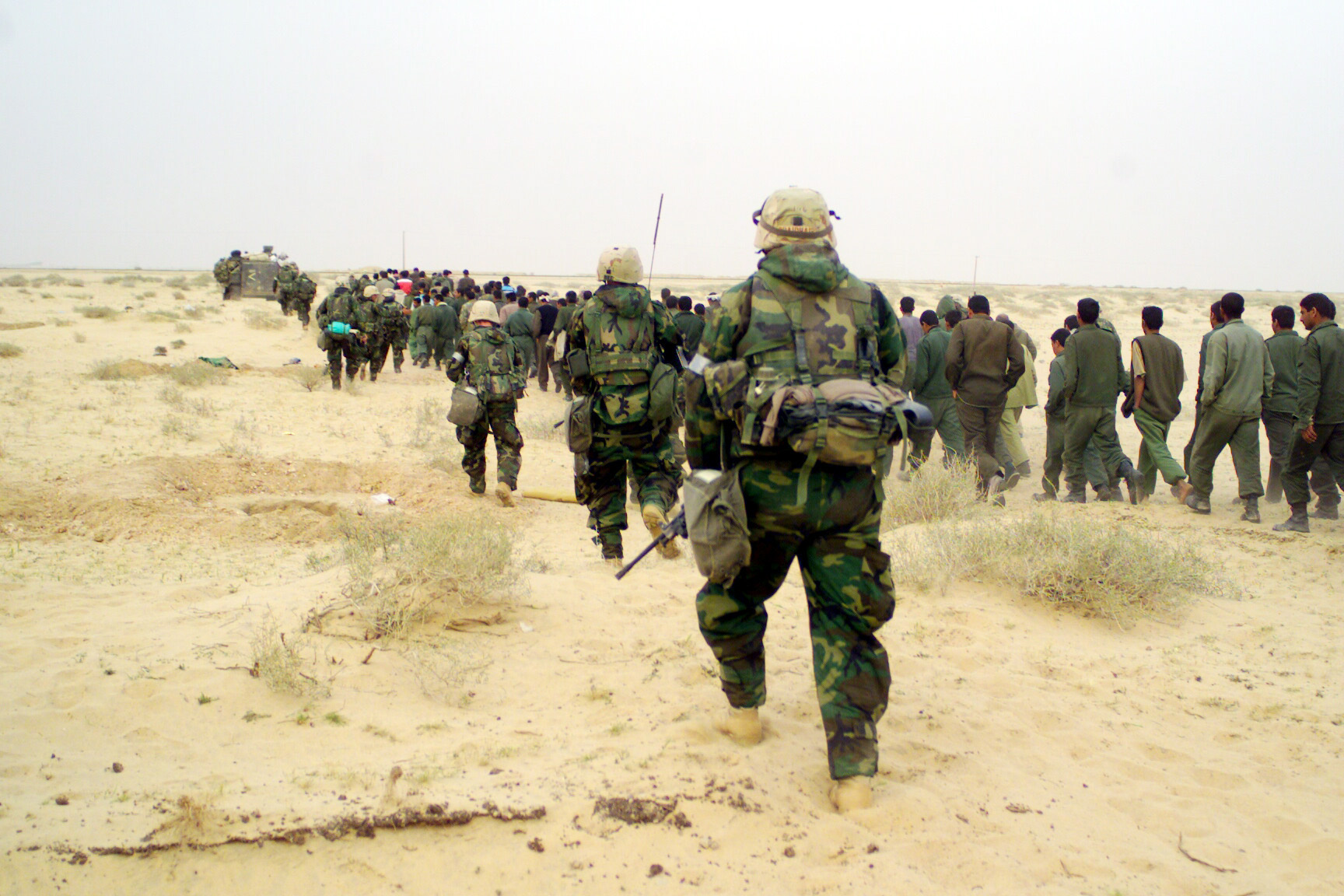
Marines from the US 1st Marine Regiment escorting Iraqi prisoners in March 2003

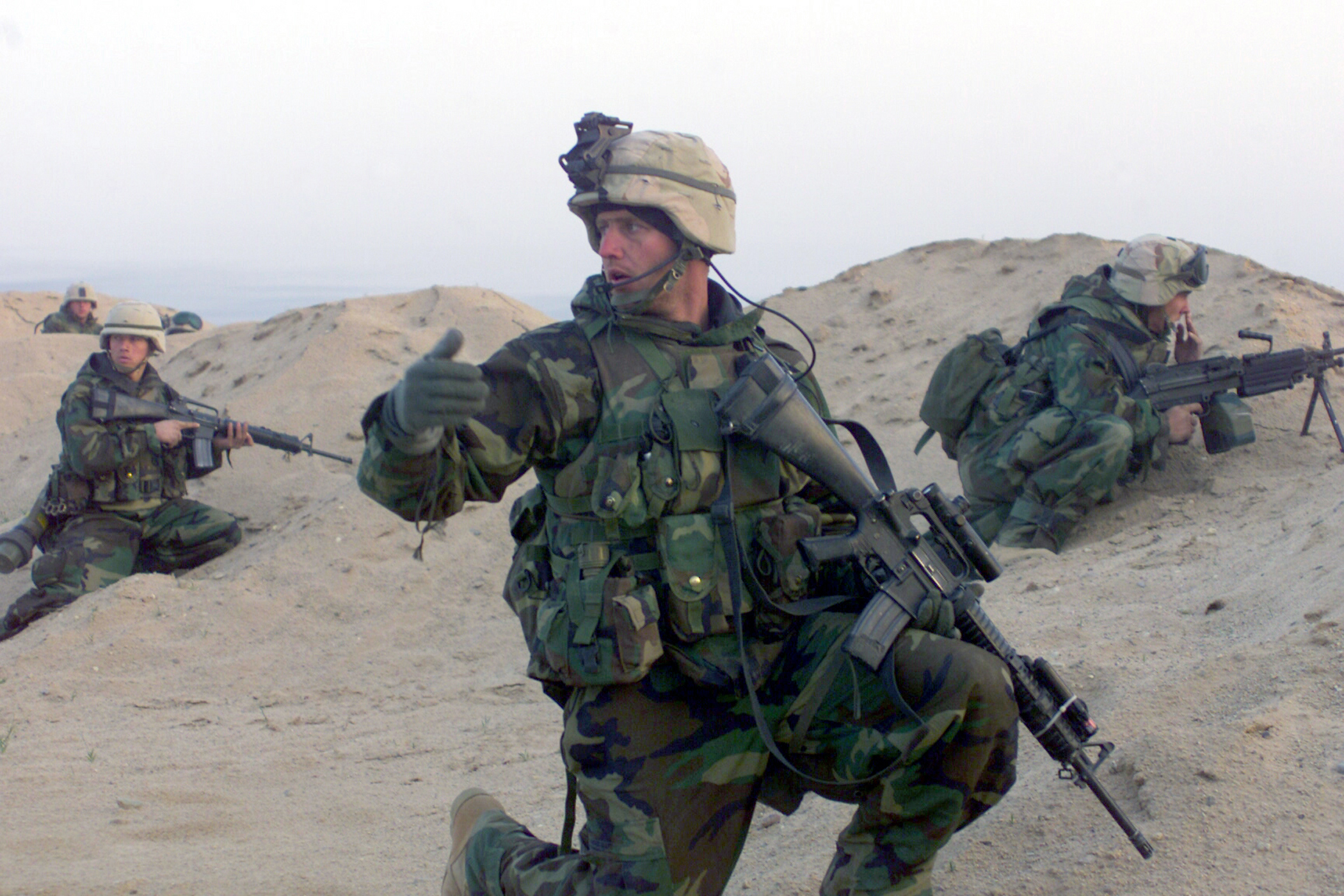
Marines from the US 15th Marine Expeditionary Unit in March 2003

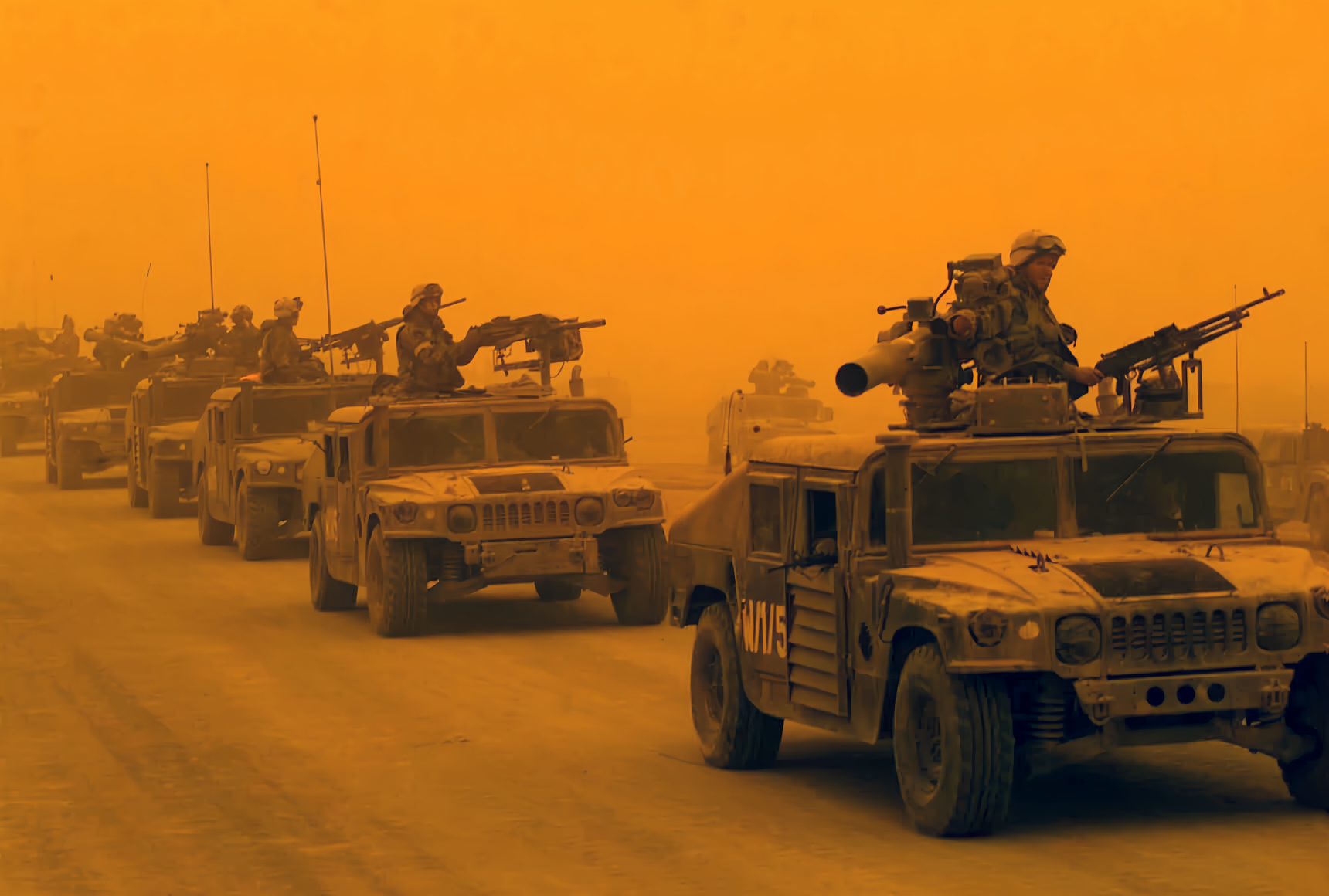
A convoy of US military vehicles

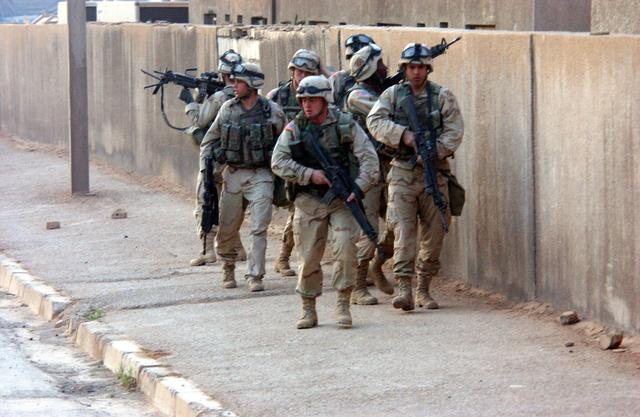
US soldiers from the 3rd Infantry Division in Baghdad in April 2003

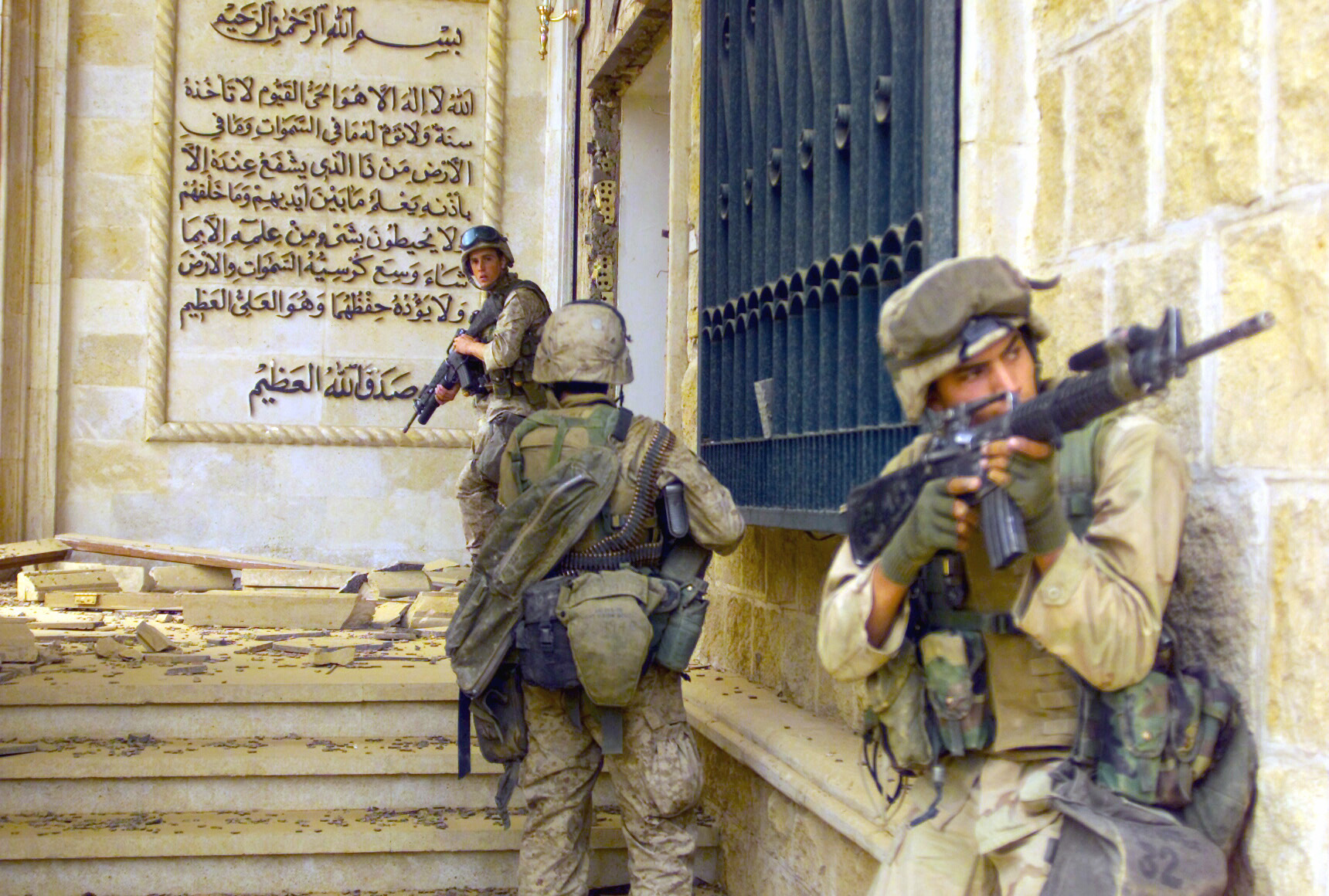
Marines from the US 1st battalion, 7th Marines at a Baghdad palace in April 2003

Lieutenant General David D. McKiernan, Commanding.

=== I Marine Expeditionary Force ===
I Marine Expeditionary Force during the 2003 invasion of Iraq.

Lieutenant General James T. Conway, Commanding General

1st Marine Division (reinforced)
Major General Jim Mattis, Commanding General

1st Marine Regiment

3rd BN, 1st Marine Regiment
1st BN, 4th Marine Regiment
2nd BN, 23rd Marine Regiment
2nd Light Armored Recon Battalion

5th Marine Regiment

1st BN, 5th Marine Regiment
2nd BN, 5th Marine Regiment
3rd BN, 5th Marine Regiment
2nd Tank Battalion
1st Light Armored Recon Battalion

7th Marine Regiment

1st BN, 7th Marine Regiment
3rd BN, 7th Marine Regiment
3rd BN, 4th Marine Regiment
1st Tank Battalion
3rd Light Armored Recon Battalion

11th Marine Regiment

1st BN, 11th Marine Regiment (155-mm Towed Artillery)
2nd BN, 11th Marine Regiment (155T)
3rd BN, 11th Marine Regiment (155T)
5th BN, 11th Marine Regiment (155T)
1st Field Artillery Detachment (Airborne)
3rd BN, 27th Field Artillery Regiment (MLRS)

1st Reconnaissance Battalion
2nd Assault Amphibian Battalion
3rd Assault Amphibian Battalion

I Marine Expeditionary Engineer Group (I MEG) (attached)
Rear Admiral Charles R. Kubic (CEC, USN), Commander

- 30th Naval Construction Regiment
- Naval Mobile Construction Battalions: NMCB-4, NMCB-5, NMCB-7, NMCB-74, NMCB-133 (plus detachments from NMCB-15, 21, 25)
- Naval Construction Force Support Unit 2
- Underwater Construction Team 2
- 22nd Naval Construction Regiment (elements)
- Construction Battalion Maintenance Unit 303 (Det)
- I MEG Command Element

2nd Marine Expeditionary Brigade (TF Tarawa)
Brigadier General Richard F. Natonski, Commanding General

2nd Marine Regiment

1st BN, 2nd Marine Regiment
3rd BN, 2nd Marine Regiment
2nd BN, 8th Marine Regiment
1st BN, 10th Marine Regiment (155T)

15th Marine Expeditionary Unit (SOC)

2nd BN, 1st Marine Regiment
S Btry, 5-11 Marine Regiment (155T)

24th Marine Expeditionary Unit

2nd BN, 2nd Marine Regiment
F Btry, 2-10 Marine Regiment (155T)

1st (UK) Armoured Division

7th Armoured Brigade

Royal Scots Dragoon Guards (Armor)
2nd Royal Tank Regiment (Armor)
1st BN, Black Watch (Armoured Infantry)
1st BN, Royal Regiment of Fusiliers (Armoured Infantry)
3rd Regiment Royal Horse Artillery (155SP)

16 Air Assault Brigade

1st BN, Parachute Regiment
3rd BN, Parachute Regiment
1st BN, Royal Irish Regiment (Air Aslt)
7th Parachute Regiment Royal Horse Artillery (105T)

3 Commando Brigade

40 Commando
42 Commando
29 Commando Regiment Royal Artillery (105T)

=== V Corps ===
V Corps command structure.

Lieutenant General William S. Wallace, Commanding General

3rd Infantry Division (Mech)

1st Brigade

2nd BN, 7th Infantry Regiment (Mech)
3rd BN, 7th Infantry Regiment (Mech)
3rd BN, 69th Armor Regiment
1st BN, 41st Field Artillery Regiment (155SP)

2nd Brigade

3rd SQN, 7th Cavalry Regiment (Mech)
3rd BN, 15th Infantry Regiment (Mech)
1st BN, 64th Armor Regiment
4th BN, 64th Armor Regiment
1st BN, 9th Field Artillery Regiment (155SP)

3rd Brigade

1st BN, 15th Infantry Regiment (Mech)
1st BN, 30th Infantry Regiment (Mech)
2nd BN, 69th Armor Regiment
1st BN, 10th Field Artillery Regiment (155SP)

101st Airborne Division (Air Assault)

2nd Brigade

1st BN, 502nd Infantry Regiment (Air Assault)
2nd BN, 502nd Infantry Regiment (Air Assault)
3rd BN, 502nd Infantry Regiment (Air Assault)
2nd BN, 70th Armor Regiment – Detached from 1st Armored Division
1st BN, 320th Field Artillery Regiment (Air Aslt) (105T)

3rd Brigade

1st BN, 187th Infantry Regiment (Air Aslt)
2nd BN, 187th Infantry Regiment (Air Aslt)
3rd BN, 187th Infantry Regiment (Air Aslt)
3rd BN, 320th Field Artillery Regiment (Air Aslt) (105T)

326th Engineer Battalion (Air Aslt)
101st Combat Aviation Brigade
159th Combat Aviation Brigade

82nd Airborne Division

2nd Brigade

1st BN, 325th Infantry Regiment (Abn)
3rd BN, 325th Infantry Regiment (Abn)
1st BN, 41st Infantry Regiment (Mech) – Detached from 1st Armored Division
2nd BN, 319th Field Artillery Regiment (Abn) (105T)

1st Brigade, 101st Airborne Division

1st BN, 327th Infantry Regiment (Air Aslt)
3rd BN, 327th Infantry Regiment (Air Aslt)
2nd BN, 320th Field Artillery Regiment (Air Aslt) (105T)

4th Infantry Division (Mech) – Unable invade through Turkey in the north due to failed diplomacy, 4ID was forced to wait for vehicles to arrive in Kuwait, before sprinting north to Baghdad. 4ID was quick to discover all lead elements had exhausted mission essential resources and placed the invasion in serious jeopardy of stalling. Unwilling to give up the momentum, 4ID distributed their supplies between the divisions and continued the push north alone.

1st Brigade

1st BN, 8th Infantry Regiment (Mech) – Detached From 3rd Brigade
1st BN, 22nd Infantry Regiment (Mech)
1st BN, 44th Air Defense Artillery Regiment (United States)
1st BN, 66th Armor Regiment
3rd BN 66th Armor Regiment
4th BN, 42nd Field Artillery Regiment (155SP)

2nd Brigade

2nd BN, 8th Infantry Regiment (Mech)
1st BN, 67th Armor Regiment
3rd BN, 67th Armor Regiment
3rd BN, 16th Field Artillery Regiment (155SP)

3d Brigade

1st BN, 12th Infantry Regiment (Mech)
1st BN, 68th Armor Regiment
3rd BN, 29th Field Artillery Regiment (155SP)

Corps Asset

V Corps Artillery

17th Field Artillery Brigade

5th BN, 3rd Field Artillery Regiment (MLRS)
1st BN, 12th Field Artillery Regiment (MLRS)
3rd BN, 18th Field Artillery Regiment (155SP)

41st Field Artillery Brigade

2nd BN, 18th Field Artillery Regiment (MLRS)
1st BN, 27th Field Artillery Regiment (MLRS)

214th Field Artillery Brigade

2nd BN, 4th Field Artillery Regiment (MLRS)

28th Combat Support Hospital
130th Engineer Brigade

265th Engineer Group
52nd Engineer Battalion (CBT HVY)
122nd Engineer Battalion (CORPS Wheeled)
864th Engineer Battalion (CBT HVY)
565th Engineer Battalion (PROV)
142nd Engineer Battalion (CBT HVY)
489th Engineer Battalion (CBT MECH)
878th Engineer Battalion (CBT HVY)

18th Military Police Brigade

211th Military Police Battalion
503rd Military Police Battalion
519th Military Police Battalion
709th Military Police Battalion
720th Military Police Battalion

205th Military Intelligence Brigade

15th Military Intelligence Battalion
165th Military Intelligence Battalion
223rd Military Intelligence Battalion
302nd Military Intelligence Battalion
325th Military Intelligence Battalion
519th Military Intelligence Battalion

22nd Signal Brigade

17th Signal Battalion
32nd Signal Battalion
44th Signal Battalion
51st Signal Battalion
440th Signal Battalion

=== Special Operations Command Central ===
Combined Joint Special Operations Task Force-North (TF Viking)

10th Special Forces Group
173rd Airborne Brigade – Conducted a parachute drop into northern Iraq on March 26, 2003

1st BN, 508th Infantry Regiment (Abn)
2nd BN, 503rd Infantry Regiment (Abn)
1st BN, 63rd Armor Regiment – (1st Infantry Division), Attached
D Btry, 319th Field Artillery Regiment (Abn) (105T)
2nd BN, 15th Field Artillery Regiment (105T) – (10th Mountain Division), attached
2nd BN, 14th Infantry Regiment – (10th Mountain Division), Attached minus Charlie Company
26th Marine Expeditionary Unit(SOC)

1st BN, 8th Marines Regiment

Combined Joint Special Operations Task Force-West (TF Dagger)

5th Special Forces Group

1st BN,124th Infantry Regiment – FLNG
Charlie Co,2nd BN,14th Infantry Regiment – (10th Mountain Division), Attached

Task Force 14

B Sqdn, 22 Special Air Service Regiment
D Sqdn, 22 Special Air Service Regiment

Task Forces 7

M Sqdn, Special Boat Service

Task Forces 64

1 Sqdn, Special Air Service Regiment
Coy, 4th Bn, Royal Australian Regiment (later became the 2nd Commando Regiment)

Task Force 20

B Sqdn, 1st Special Forces Operational Detachment-Delta
C Sqdn, 1st Special Forces Operational Detachment-Delta
Gold Sqdn, Naval Special Warfare Development Group
75th Ranger Regiment

Naval Special Warfare Task Group - Central

SEAL Team 3
SEAL Team 5
SEAL Team 8
SEAL Team 10
Plt, SEAL Delivery Vehicle Team 1
Special Boat Team 12
Special Boat Team 20
GROM

== Iraqi Armed Forces ==
Saddam Hussein was the supreme armed forces commander.

=== Army ===
Chief of Staff: Ibrahim Abd al-Sattar Muhammad Ahmed

==== Northern Iraq ====
- I Corps – Kirkuk City
  - 2nd Infantry Division – Alrabee
  - 5th Mechanized Division – Shuwan
  - 38th Infantry Division – Quader Karam
- V corps – Mosul
  - 1st Mechanized Division – Makhmur
  - 4th Infantry Division – Maonten
  - 7th Infantry Division – Alton Kopri Castle
  - 16th Infantry Division – Saddam Dam

==== Eastern Iraq ====
- II Corps – Deyala
  - 3rd Armoured Division – Jalawia
  - 15th Infantry Division – Amerli
  - 34th Infantry Division – Khanaqin

==== Southern Iraq ====
- III Corps– Nasseria
  - 6th Armoured Division – Majnoon
  - 11th Infantry Division – Al Naserria
  - 51st Mechanized Division – Zubair
- IV corps – AL Amara
  - 10th Armoured Division – AL Teab
  - 14th Infantry Division – Al Amara
  - 18th Infantry Division – Al Musharah

=== Republican Guard ===
Under the supervision of Qusay Hussein, commanded by Staff General Sayf al-Din Taha al-Rawi.

- I Corps of the Republican Guards
  - Al Medina Armored Division; 2nd, 10th and 14th Brigades.
  - Baghdad Mechanized Division; including the 4th, 5th, and 6th Motorized Brigades.
  - Adnan Infantry Division; 11th, 12th, 21st, and Divisional Artillery Brigades.
- II Corps of the Republican Guards
  - Al Nida Armored Division; 41st, 42nd, 43rd Brigades.
  - Nebuchadnezzer Mechanized Division; 19th, 22nd and 23rd Brigades.
  - Hammurabi Armoured Division - possibly with Western Desert Force; 8th, 9th Mechanized Brigades, 18th Armored, Division Artillery Brigade.

=== Special Republican Guard ===
Under the supervision of Qusay Hussein, commanded by Major general Kheir-Allah Wahees Omar al-Nassiri. It serves as a Praetorian Guard which is located within Baghdad and is organized to defend the regime.

- 1st Brigade
- 2nd Brigade
- 3rd Brigade
- 4th Brigade
- Armor Command

== See also ==
- Iraq War order of battle, 2009
