= Mortaritaville =

Mortaritaville may refer to:

- Logistics Base Seitz, commonly known as Log Base Seitz, near Baghdad International Airport
- Logistics Support Area Anaconda, near Balad, Iraq
