= Balad Air Base =

Iraqi Air Force base in Balad, Wasit Governorate

Balad Air Base Joint Base Balad
- قاعدة النعمانية الجوية
- Balad, Saladin Governorate in Iraq

Site information
- Owner: Iraqi Armed Forces
- Operator: Iraqi Air Force
- Condition: Defunct

Location
- Shown within Iraq
- Coordinates: 33°56′00″N 044°22′00″E

Site history
- Built: 1983; 43 years ago
- Battles/wars: Iran–Iraq War; 2003 invasion of Iraq

Airfield information
- Identifiers: IATA: XQC, ICAO: ORBD, LID: OR9
- Elevation: 49 metres (161 ft) AMSL
Runways
Direction	Length and surface
12/30	4,100 metres (13,451 ft) Concrete
14/32	4,100 metres (13,451 ft) Concrete
- Dispersal facilities: 25 high-speed approaches and 40 hardstands

Balad Air Base (Arabic: قاعدة بلد الجوية) (ICAO: ORBD) is an Iraqi Air Force base located near Balad in the Sunni Triangle 40 miles (64 km) north of Baghdad, Iraq.

Built in the early 1980s, it was originally named Al-Bakr Air Base. In 2003 the base was taken over by the U.S. 4th Infantry Division at the start of the Iraq War. It was called both Balad Air Base and Anaconda Logistical Support Area (LSA) by the United States Army before being renamed Joint Base Balad on June 15, 2008. The base was handed back to the Iraqi Air Force on November 8, 2011, during the U.S. withdrawal from Iraq, after which it returned to being called Balad Air Base.

During the Iraq War it was the second largest U.S. base in Iraq. It was also one of the busiest airports in the world with 27,500 takeoffs and landings per month, second only to Heathrow Airport. Today it is home to the Iraqi Air Force's contingent of Lockheed Martin F-16 Fighting Falcons.

== History ==
=== Ba'athist Iraq ===
In 1983, Balad Air Base was constructed to improve the deployment flexibility of the Iraqi Air Force (IQAF), and as part of a national drive to construct new airfields and renovate existing ones. Two 3,400-meter-long runways orientated NW/SE were constructed. Additional installation of facilities included 6 high-speed approaches on either ends of both runways, which totalled up to 19, two taxiways, three cross-over links, and three aprons. There were four dispersal facilities that totalled up to 19 hardstands/aircraft bunkers, with one at the end of each high-speed approaches. By June 1983, Balad Air Base was in the mid to late-stages of construction, with one runway already operational. At some point, additional high-speed approaches and hardened aircraft shelters (HAS) were added, totalling up to 25 high-speed approaches and 40 shelters, creating one of the most extensive dispersal facilities in Iraq.

Balad was formerly known as Al-Bakr Air Base, named in honor of Ahmed Hassan al-Bakr, the president of Iraq from 1968 to 1979. It was considered by many in the Iraqi military to be the most important airfield of the Iraqi Air Force. During most of the 1980s, it operated with at least a brigade level force, with two squadrons of Mikoyan-Gurevich MiG-23 fighters. Al-Bakr Air Base was especially well known for the large number of HAS built by Yugoslavian contractors during the Iran–Iraq War in the mid-1980s. It had four hardened areas—one each on either end of the main runways—with approximately 40 individual aircraft shelters.

=== U.S. military presence (2003–2011) ===
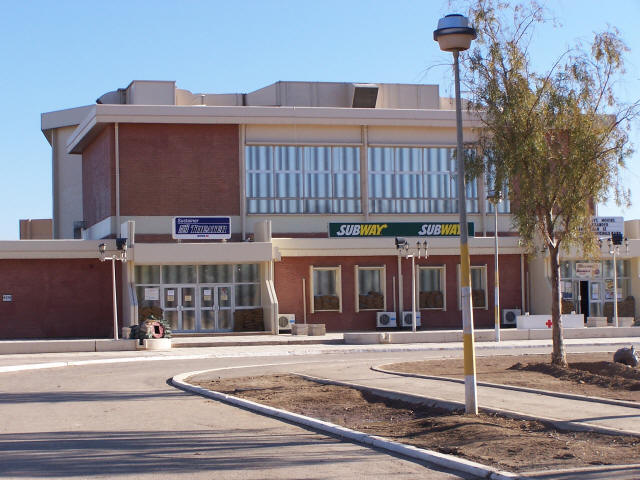
The Sustainer Theater at Joint Base Balad where US movies were played.

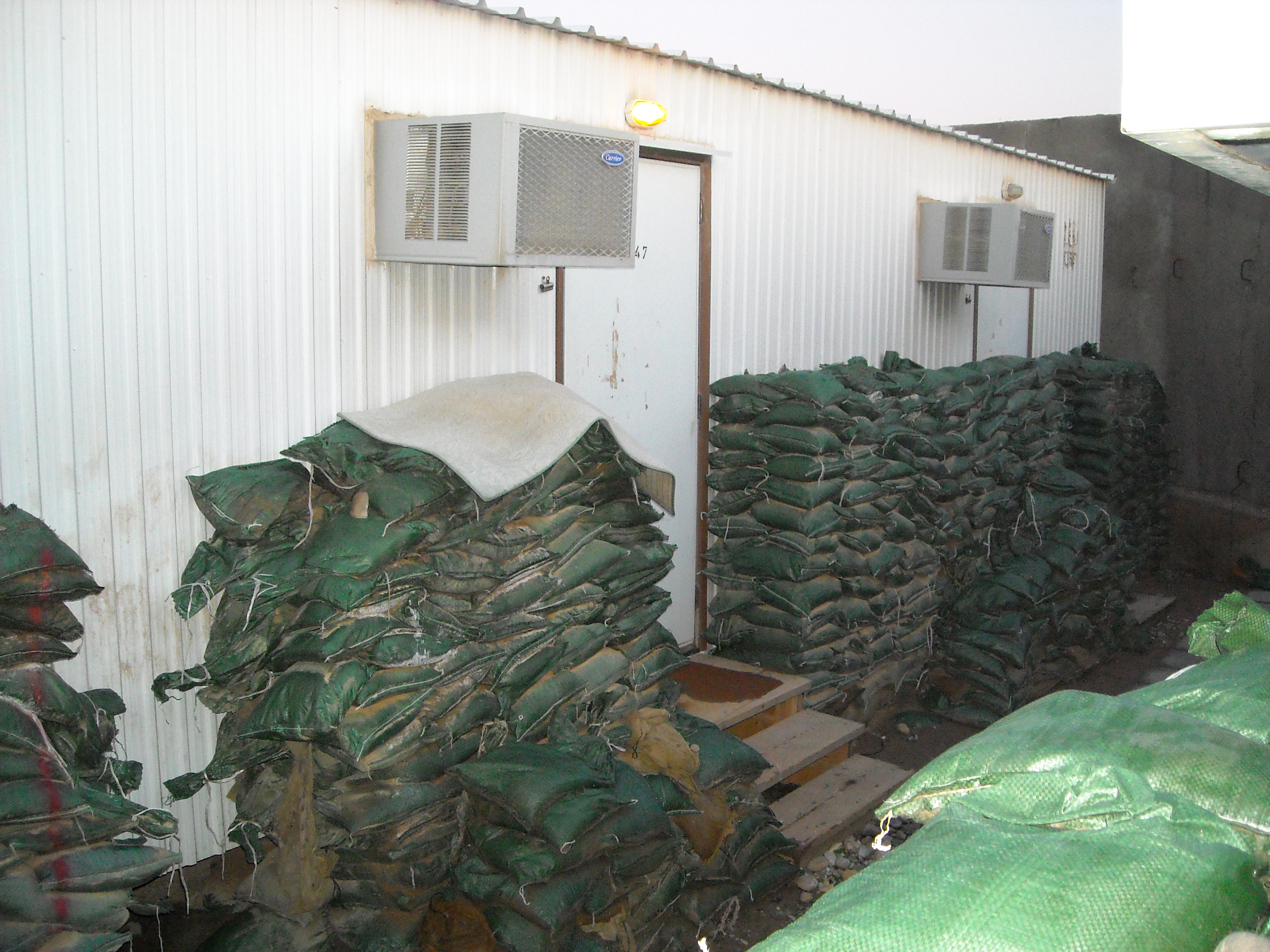
Living quarters for NCOs, SNCOs and officers in the H-6 housing compound on JBB, referred to as "pods", circa Jan 2009

The base was captured by U.S. forces in early April 2003, renaming it Camp Anaconda and later Joint Base Balad (JBB). The area was nicknamed "Mortaritaville" (in a play on Margaritaville), because of a high frequency of incoming mortars, at times every day, from Iraqi insurgents. Camp Anaconda has also been more colloquially-termed "Life Support Area Anaconda" or the "Big Snake".

The U.S. Army 310th Sustainment Command (Expeditionary) and the U.S. Air Force 332d Air Expeditionary Wing were headquartered at JBB. It was decided that the facility share one name even though it had differing names through its different occupants. Until mid-2008 the U.S. Army had been in charge of Balad but overall control was handed to the U.S. Air Force when it was designated a joint base. Balad was the central logistical hub for coalition forces in Iraq. Joint Base Balad also hosted a Level I trauma center Air Force Theater Hospital which boasted a 98% survival rate for wounded Americans and Iraqis.

It housed 28,000 military personnel and 8,000 civilian contractors. Like most large bases in Iraq, LSA Anaconda offered amenities including a base movie theater (Sustainer Theater), two Base/Post Exchanges (BX/PX), fast food courts including Subway, Popeyes, Pizza Hut, Taco Bell (2007), Burger King, Green Beans Coffee, a Turkish cafe, an Iraqi bazaar, multiple gyms, dance lessons, an Olympic size swimming pool, and an indoor swimming pool.

The base was a common destination for celebrities and politicians visiting US troops serving in Iraq on USO Tours including the Charlie Daniels band (2005), Vince Vaughn (2005), Carrie Underwood (2006),Wayne Newton, Toby Keith, Gary Sinise, Chris Isaak, Neal McCoy, Oliver North, and WWE.

==== Mortaritaville ====
Starting in 2003, several mortar rounds and rockets were fired per day by insurgents, usually hitting the empty space between the runways, although there were isolated injuries and fatalities. By mid-2006, this rate had dropped by about 40%. Due to these attacks, the soldiers and airmen refer to the base as "Mortaritaville", though this name is shared with other bases in Iraq.

==== Burn Pit ====
Joint Base Balad had a burn pit operation as late as the summer of 2010. The pit, which was visible for miles, was in continuous use which resulted in 147 tons of waste burnt per day, some of which was considered toxic. Respiratory difficulties and headaches were attributed to smoke inhalation from the burnt waste; however, according to research conducted on behalf of the US Department of Veteran Affairs, there is insufficient evidence to connect those symptoms to burn pits. Despite this, the VA allows service members to file claims for symptoms they believe to be related to burn pit exposure.

==== Black Jail ====
A black jail, a U.S. military detention camp to interrogate high-value detainees, was established at Balad in summer of 2004, named the Temporary Screening Facility (TSF). A British Secret Intelligence Service (MI6) lawyer who visited a black jail, believed to be at Balad, described it as holding prisoners in wooden crates, too small to stand in or lie down, who were subject to white noise. General Stanley McChrystal, commander of Joint Special Operations Command, regularly visited the site, reporting that the staff of interrogators and analysts was six times the number of detainees, enabling important detainees to be questioned through each shift.

==== 2007 AerianTur-M Antonov An-26 crash ====
On 9 January 2007, an Antonov An-26 airliner operated by AerianTur-M on behalf of the U.S. Air Force crashed while attempting to land at the air base, killing 34 passengers and crew.

==== Units ====
54th Medavac Dust-off April 2003- April 2004 / Nov 2004 -Nov 2005

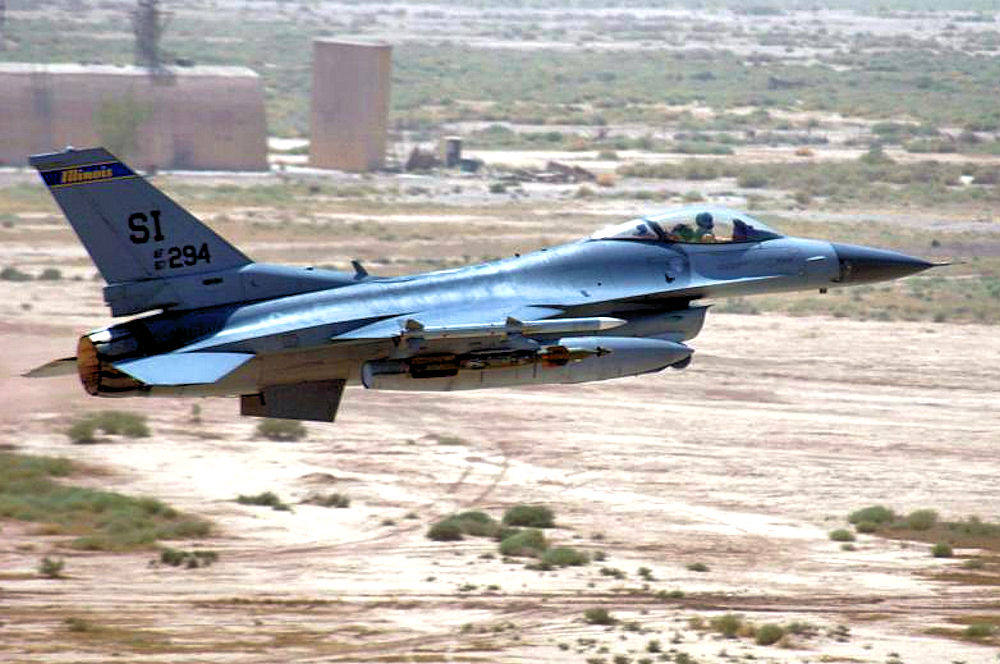
170th EFS F-16, from Springfield, Illinois, taking off from Joint Base Balad

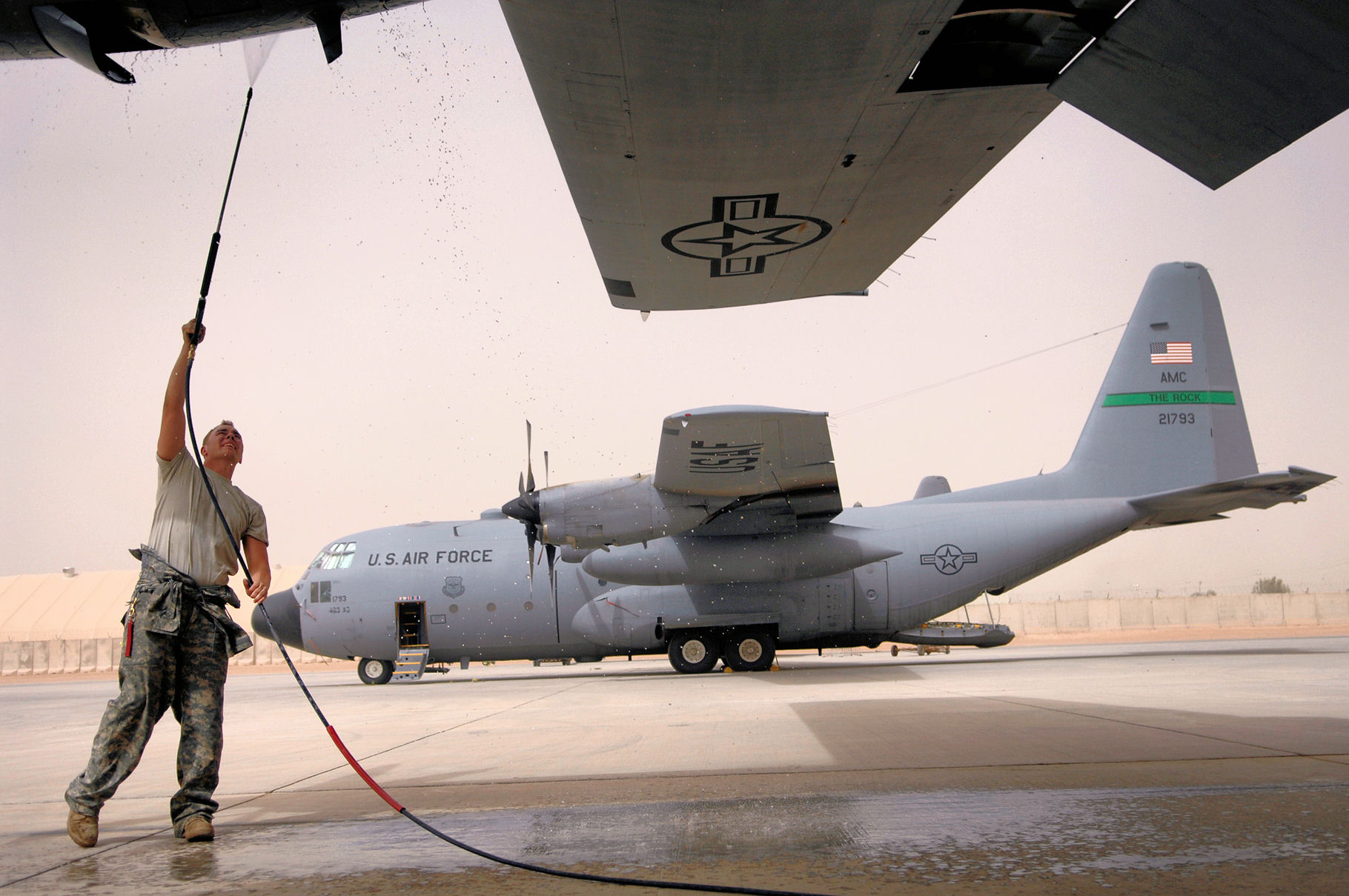
777th Expeditionary Airlift Squadron C-130 Hercules at Balad AB Iraq getting a power wash of the engines to ensure that built-up dust does not get pulled into the intake during flight.

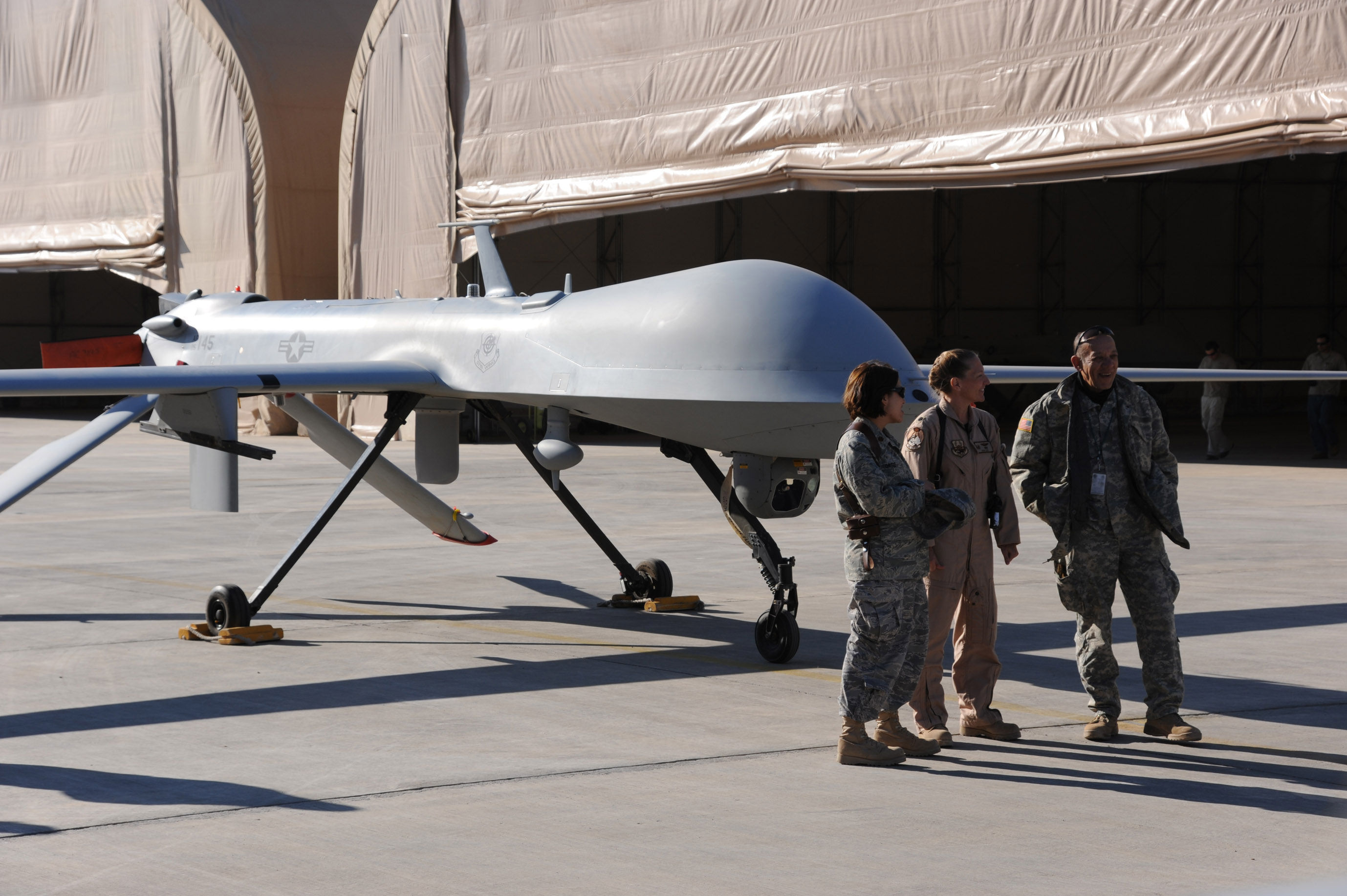
46th Expeditionary Reconnaissance Squadron MQ-1B Predator UAV

===== Ground forces =====
- 31st Combat Support Hospital (CSH) January 2004 - October 2004
- 54th Medical Detachment (Air Ambulance) "Dust-off! April 2003- April 2004 / Nov 2004 -Nov 2005
- 855th Military Police Company (Desert Warriors), AZ ARNG, April–July 2003
- 907th ENG Firefighters, February 2004 - February 2005
- 123rd Mobile Public Affairs Detachment, AZ ARNG, October 2008 – September 2009
- 129th Combat Sustainment Support Battalion (101st Sustainment Brigade)
- 372d Transportation Company (129th CSSB)
- 172nd Corps Support Group
- 1st Battalion, 142nd Aviation Regiment (Aviation Intermediate Maintenance) (AVIM) (172nd CSG)
- 213th Area Support Group (ASG) (316th ESC), Jul 2007 - Jun 2008 during the height of the "Surge"
- 13th Combat Sustainment Support Battalion (213th ASG)
- 308th Civil Affairs Brigade (March–April 2004)
- 142ND ECB (HEAVY) & 957 MRBC (NDANG) April 2003 – Feb 2004
- 32nd Signal Battalion, 22nd Signal Brigade 2003 – March 2004 and October 2005 - October 2006
- 100th Battalion, 442nd Infantry Regiment, Jan 2005 – Jan 2006
- 50th Signal Battalion (Airborne), 35th Signal Brigade, Nov 2004 – Nov 2005
- 63rd Expeditionary Signal Battalion (ESB) 35th Signal Brigade July 2007 – Oct 2008
- 557th Maintenance Company Oct 2007 – Dec 2008
- 602nd Maintenance Company Apr 2008 – Jun 2009
- A/51st Signal Battalion (Airborne) (along with an unknown MP platoon and 692nd Quartermaster Battalion {Water Purification}) took control in mid April 2003 from the 1st Battalion, 124th Infantry Regiment until V corps arrived around 1 May 2003
- 532nd Expeditionary Security Forces Squadron
- 411th Engineer Brigade between 2006 and 2007
- NMCB 28 and NMCB 4 – 2007
- Headquarters and Support Company, 463d Engineer Combat Battalion (Heavy) between 2004 and 2005
- 452 Ordnance Company (PLS/MOADS) between 2004 and 2005
- 77th Sustainment Brigade 2011
- 13th Corps Support Command (COSCOM) between 2004 and 2005
- 1st Sustainment Command (Expeditionary) between 2006 and 2007
- 316th Sustainment Command (Expeditionary) between 2007 and 2008
- 1st Sustainment Command (Expeditionary) between 2008 and 2009
- 194th Engineer Brigade (TN ARNG), Jackson, TN; Corps Engineer Brigade, August 2009 – April 2010
- 103rd Sustainment Command (Expeditionary) between 2009 and 2011
- 100th Infantry Battalion
- 834th Aviation Support Battalion
- 864th Engineer Battalion (Combat Heavy) (April 2003-January 2004)
- 912th AG Company (Postal) 1st and 2nd PLT (Orlando, FL) June 2003 – June 2004
- 29th Brigade Combat Team (Hawaii ARNG) January 2005 – February 2006
- 323rd Military Police Company (Toledo, Ohio) April 2003 – July 2003
- Bravo Company, 279th Signal Battalion, Alabama ARNG, 2004–2005
- 81st HBCT, WA ARNG, April 2004 – 2005
- 30th Engineer Brigade (Theater Army) NC ARNG January–December 2005
- 1563 flight Royal Air Force 2005–2011
- 1460th Transportation Company (Midland, MI) June 2003 – April 2004
- 705th T.C. Fuel Tanker Company 2003–2004 – Army Reserve Unit based out of Dayton, Ohio
- 1st Battalion 8th Infantry 3rd BCT 4th ID – 2003-2004 and 2005–2006 based out of Fort Carson, CO
- 32D MEDLOG BN (Medical Logistics Battalion) OIF 04-06 (Oct 2004 - Nov 2005) as 32D MMB (Multifunction Medical Battalion) OIF 06-08 (Sept 2006 - Dec 2007) based out of Fort Bragg, NC
- 152nd MP Det.(L&O) June 2003 - April 2004
- 40th Corps Support Group (Formerly 40th DISCOM) California National Guard (Long Beach, CA), Sept 2005-Sept 2006.
- 505th Engineers Battalion (Combat Heavy) NC National Guard, October 2005 - March 2006, (Move to Camp Speicher )
- 253rd Trans Company (Light/Medium) NJ Army National Guard, Apr 2003 - June 2004
- 196th Trans Company (PLS) Orlando, Fl Mar 2003- April 2004
- 40th Expeditionary Signal Battalion from Ft. Huachuca, AZ Dec 2007 - Mar 2009
- 266th MP CO, VA Army National Guard, 2009

===== Aviation forces =====
US Air Force

- 332d Air Expeditionary Wing
  - 332d Expeditionary Operations Group
    - 22d Expeditionary Fighter Squadron – F-16CM Block 50 Fighting Falcons.
    - 510th Expeditionary Fighter Squadron (Aviano AB, Italy)
    - 34th Expeditionary Fighter Squadron from May to October 2008
    - 332d Expeditionary Fighter Squadron – F-16 Block 30 Fighting Falcons
      - 107th Expeditionary Fighter Squadron (Michigan ANG)
      - 111th Expeditionary Fighter Squadron (Texas ANG)
      - 119th Expeditionary Fighter Squadron (New Jersey ANG)
      - 120th Expeditionary Fighter Squadron (Colorado ANG)
      - 121st Expeditionary Fighter Squadron (DC ANG)
      - 124th Expeditionary Fighter Squadron (Iowa ANG)
      - 125th Expeditionary Fighter Squadron (Oklahoma ANG)
      - 170th Expeditionary Fighter Squadron (Illinois ANG)
      - 176th Expeditionary Fighter Squadron (Wisconsin ANG)
      - 179th Expeditionary Fighter Squadron (Minnesota ANG)
      - 186th Expeditionary Fighter Squadron (Montana ANG)
      - 188th Expeditionary Fighter Squadron (New Mexico ANG)ANG)
- 60th SECURITY FORCES SQUADRON (2003 to 2004)
- 777th Expeditionary Airlift Squadron – C-130 Hercules
- 64th Expeditionary Rescue Squadron – HH-60 Pave Hawk
- 46th Expeditionary Reconnaissance Squadron – MQ-1B Predator
- 332d Expeditionary Operations Support Squadron – airfield management
- 362d Expeditionary Reconnaissance Squadron – MC-12W Liberty
- 727th Expeditionary Air Control Squadron – tactical command and control agency

Army

- 1st Battalion, 131st Aviation Regiment from September 2006.
- Task Force 11th Aviation Regiment (United States Army Europe) from April 2003 until February 2004
- 528 Quartermasters Ft. Lewis Washington 2003–2004
- 172 Medical Logistics Battalion, Ogden, UT 2003-2004
- M/158 Aviation Regiment (AVIM) (1-142 AVN BN)
- 159th Combat Aviation Brigade Oct 2005 – Oct 2006

== Current use ==
On 8 November 2011, as U.S. forces were in the process of withdrawing from Iraq, Joint Base Balad was handed back to the Iraqi Air Force, after which it returned to being called Balad Air Base. The base is home to the Iraqi Air Force's General Dynamics F-16 Fighting Falcons of 9th Fighter Squadron (34 aircraft operating in 2023).

=== Sallyport Global Human Rights Abuses and Corruption ===
In 2014, Sallyport Global, subsidiary of Caliburn International (now called Acuity International), was awarded contracts to work on Balad Air Base in support of the Iraqi F-16 program. Following reports alleging timesheet fraud, investigators found evidence of alcohol smuggling, human trafficking, security violations, and theft. The investigators were subsequently fired by the human resources personnel that they were originally sent to investigate, and removed from the base under armed guard. Employees have also raised concern about racism, particularly from white South African security guards who made open endorsements of Apartheid and refused to work alongside Iraqis and other people of color. Former employees say that they feared for their safety at the base due to security failures. In one such report, a militia member shot a bomb-sniffing dog that had flagged their vehicle. It is also said that animals were intentionally starved, and the company withheld passports from employees who wished to leave.

Sallyport is also being investigated by United States Department of Justice on allegations of bribing Iraqi officials for exclusive contracts.

=== Islamic State attacks ===
The base came under attack by ISIL militants in late June 2014, when the insurgents launched mortar attacks and reportedly surrounded the base on three sides.

On January 4, 2020, the base came under a rocket attack, and no claims of responsibility have been made yet. The attack wounded four people. On 20 February 2021, four rockets targeted the base, in which one Iraqi contractor was wounded.

Rockets fell in Iraq’s Balad air base on March 17, 2022 leaving no damage, 2 security forces wounded.

== See also ==
- 2007 Balad Air Base An-26 crash
- List of United States Military installations in Iraq
- United States Forces – Iraq
