= LWN =

LWN may refer to:

- Labour Women's Network, an organization associated with the Labour Party (UK)
- LWN.net, a computing webzine
- LandWarNet, the United States Army's contribution to the Global Information Grid
- Live Well Network, a television network
- Shirak Airport (IATA code), Armenia
