= Land War (disambiguation) =

The Land War was a period of agrarian unrest in Ireland in the late 19th century. Land War may also refer to:

- Ground warfare, military conflict fought on land
- New Zealand Wars, also called the Land Wars, between Māori people and European settlers
- LandWarNet, United States Army contribution to the Global Information Grid
- Land Warrior, United States Army program cancelled in 2007
