= 32nd Signal Battalion (United States) =

- Active: 1943–1946; 1955–2007
- Country: United States
- Branch: U.S. Army
- Type: Signal battalion
- Part of: 22nd Signal Brigade
- Garrison/HQ: Darmstadt, Germany Kelly Barracks
- Motto: "Sound the Warhorns!”
- Orange/White Bulgle-Type Horn: Orange/White
- Engagements: World War II; Operation Iraqi Freedom
- Decorations: Meritorious Unit Commendation

Commanders
- Current commander: None: On 22 May 2007, deactivated

Insignia
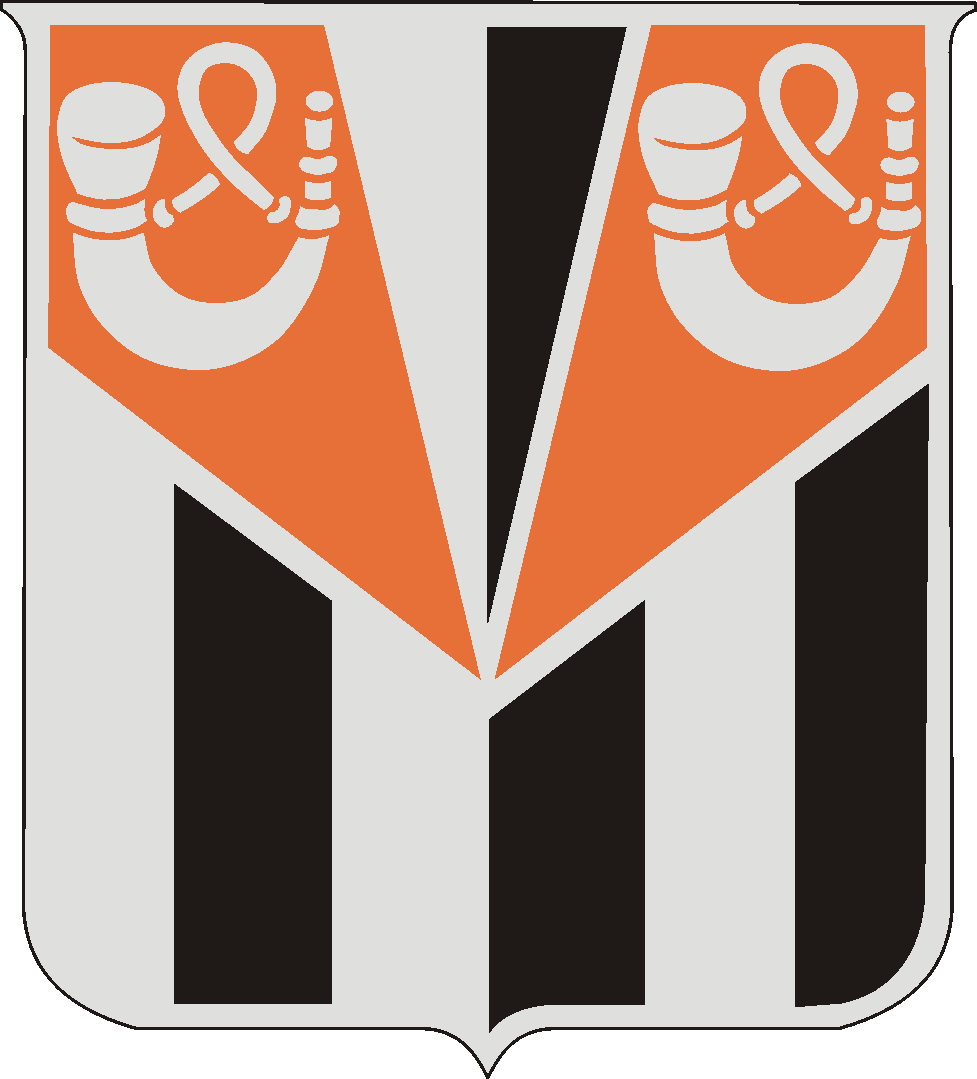
- Distinctive Unit Insignia

The 32nd Signal Battalion is a Mobile Subscriber Equipment (MSE)-equipped Corps Signal Battalion. They provide Command, Control, Communications and Computer (C4) support to 22nd Signal Brigade, part of the United States Army's V Corps. The 32nd Signal Battalion consists of one Headquarters Company, three MSE companies, and one MSE signal support company.

As of 2006, the commander of 32nd Signal Battalion was Lieutenant Colonel William S. Schumaker. The Battalion Command Sergeant Major was John O. Graves.

== Mission ==
The battalion's mission statement is:

On order, the 32nd Signal Battalion rapidly deploys to offer signals support to V Corps or other contingency forces in support of any assigned mission throughout the spectrum of conflict.

== History ==
=== World War II ===
On 20 March 1943, the 32nd Signal Construction Company was organized and activated at Chicago, Illinois. Shortly after its activation, the company was transferred, without soldiers or equipment, to the Signal Corps Unit Training center at Camp Crowder, Missouri, and ordered into active military service as the 32nd Signal Construction Battalion on 25 March 1943.

The new battalion, consisting of construction companies A and B, and a headquarters, began training immediately for shipment overseas. After training at Camp Crowder, and aiding in flood rehabilitation work in Missouri, the battalion moved to Camp Shanks, New York, to prepare for transport to Europe. When the battalion sailed out of the North River Harbor on 27 February 1944, it consisted of twenty-three officers, one warrant officer, and 570 soldiers.

Once in England, the battalion began preparing for the 6 June invasion of Normandy. Detachment A of the battalion crossed the channel and began installing wire for communications lines later in the month, on 8 June. On the 14 of the same month, the rest of the battalion crossed to France and started work. Moving with the fighting forces across France, the battalion entered German territory at Korneli Munster on the sixteenth of September. After the capture of the Lundendorf Bridge near Remagen, the battalion strung two telephone cables taken from a captured German submarine across the Rhine river, while under attack from small arms fire and aircraft. The cables provided dependable communications between the American forces on both sides of the river at the breakthrough point. Communications support continued until the German surrender on 9 May 1945.

On 19 May, the battalion moved from Weimar, Germany, to Marseilles, France, where it re-organized as a Signal Light Construction Battalion and boarded ships en route to the Pacific Theater. On 1 August 1945, while still at sea, the ship's captain announced the end of hostilities with Japan. The battalion debarked at Hagas Ti Port, Okinawa, and set up camp on 1 September.

On 30 December 1945, the battalion was reconstituted as a corps-type signal battalion and a month later, inactivated on Okinawa.

=== Cold War Era ===
The 32nd Signal Battalion (Corps) was reactivated at Cambrai-Fritsch Kaserne, Darmstadt, Germany, under V Corps USAREUR, 28 January 1955. The 322nd Signal Battalion, a reserve unit, then stationed and operating for V Corps at Cambrai-Fritsch, was inactivated and, in place, became the soldiers and equipment of the 32nd Signal Battalion (Corps).

In October 1961, the battalion's cable construction ability was eliminated. In March 1964, after spending nine years in Darmstadt, USAREUR moved the battalion to McNair Kaserne in Höchst, Germany, a borough of Frankfurt.

In May 1961, the battalion increased in size from three to five companies. On 26 June 1969, the 201st Signal Company was attached to the battalion, bringing the number assigned personnel over 1000. LTC Hoagland was battalion commander from 1968 to 1969. He was followed by LTC Gouge, who commanded the battalion to at least 1970.

On 16 March 1981, the 32nd Signal Battalion (Corps) was split into a command operations battalion, designated the 17th Signal Battalion (Command), a corps radio battalion, the 32nd Signal Battalion (Radio), and brigade headquarters, the 22d Signal Brigade. The 32nd Signal Battalion (Radio) had four companies which provided the command multichannel radio systems, radioteletype and FM in support of V Corps.

In June 1986, the 32nd Signal Battalion (Radio) was re-organized as a corps-area battalion and re-designated the 32nd Signal Battalion (Area). In addition to providing command multichannel and radioteletype support, the battalion provided three Corps Area Signal Centers, complete with automatic switching to support V Corps' tactical area of operations.

=== 1990 through 2001 ===
From September through December 1990, the battalion was re-organized as a Corps MSE Battalion, conducting a one hundred-percent swap-out of its equipment and re-activating D Company. D Company, known as the "Dragons" consisted of one Large Extension Node, sixteen Small Extension Nodes, and four remote access units.

The 32nd Signal Battalion (MSE) consists of five companies, authorizing over 580 personnel. The radioteletype and cable installation ability of the battalion since been eliminated, but gained enormous capabilities with the Mobile Subscriber Equipment. The battalion's primary mission is to provide six MSE node centers for the Corps Area Support Network, one large extension node, and twenty-six small extension nodes to support V Corps and its subordinate units.

In January 1992, the 32nd Signal Battalion moved back to Darmstadt, to Kelley Barracks Kaserne, where it continues to offer communications support for V Corps from the city where peacetime support began in 1955.

On 22 March 1993, the 32nd Signal Battalion was presented the United States Army Superior Unit Award for meritorious achievement.

In December 1995, elements of the 32nd Signal Battalion deployed to Taszar, Hungary, in support of Operation Joint Endeavor. This year-long deployment marked the beginning of the 32nd's role in peace keeping operations.

In April 1999, the 32nd deployed over half of the Battalion to Tirana, Albania, to support Task Force Hawk, Operation Allied Force. Following the Allied victory, elements of the 32nd deployed into Kosovo as part of Task Force Falcon. More recently, 32nd Signal Battalion soldiers served with distinction in the Balkans, supporting the Kosovo TOA in June 2001.

Some soldiers were deployed outside the wire with both the 82nd Airborne Infantry in support of infantry and MLRS, Multiple Launch Rocket Systems, in the valleys near the border of Kosovo and Albania.

First Sergeant (now retired) Lockett of D-Company was one of the first to arrive at Operation Task Force Hawk, with the commanding officer Captain Wong also of D-Company. Soldiers from the 32nd were tasked to perform duties of implementing a communications infrastructure to support V-Corps, as well as the "heart of operations in Kosovo". The men and women of the 32nd did this without flaw, and with exceptional speed and accuracy, and provided the vital communications methods without fail every time.

Edited By SPC. Eric R. Clark
Former D-Co 32nd Signal Battalion
I Trp 124 Cavalry Div.

=== Operation Iraqi Freedom ===
The 32nd Signal Battalion received its deployment order to Kuwait in January 2003. On 26 February, the 32nd Signal Battalion stood up Task Force Warhorn, a contingent of elements from three signal battalions, under the 22nd Signal Brigade. On 5 March, the 32nd Signal Battalion's main body arrived in Kuwait. The Warhorns were given the responsibility of all MSE communications for units south of the berm, ranging from the tactical assembly areas (TAAs) at the Iraqi border to the various desert kabals throughout Kuwait.

On the eve of the war, several Task Force Warhorn assets were in place along the Iraqi border. NC02 enabled RAU coverage along the berm-crossing site, providing the only communications during the three-day berm crossing back into the Corps MSE network. Shortly after the opening shots were fired, NC05 moved north towards LSA Adder, eventually relocating to Tallil Airbase to link Iraq into the Kuwait network. Unbeknownst to C Company soldiers, they were sitting in the middle of the largest weapons cache in southern Iraq, and the Iraqis wanted their weapons back. Meanwhile, Node Center 01 was task organized under the 17th Signal Battalion and traveled north to LSA Bushmaster while TACON for movement under one of3ID's Brigade Combat Teams. Alpha Company sandwiched their vehicles between Bradleys, M1A1 tanks and MLRS launchers to cross the berm, eventually moving as far north as the Karbala Gap during the next 72 hours. Node Center 02, task organized under the 440th Signal Battalion, sprinted north to Dogwood, arriving there on 24 March. Task Force Warhorn, in the meantime, was responsible for MSE and long-haul communications from LSA Adder south to the kabals in Kuwait.

As Baghdad fell in mid April, it became clear that 32nd Signal assets would not be focussed around the city in preparation for a prolonged battle. Instead, Task Force Warhorn would place its assets at Balad South East airfield, about 1 hour's drive north of Baghdad. Balad, or LSA Anaconda, as it would later be known, was to become the major logistical hub for central Iraq. As the Corps Rear's base of operations, LSA Anaconda's impact on the outcome of the war and later peacekeeping operations cannot be underestimated. A Company with Node Centers 01 and 02, and C Company with Node Center 05 arrived there in late April and early May to begin signal operations.

In May 2003, LSA Anaconda had a population of 16,000 soldiers and contractors. At its height there were six Node Centers, one LEN, and thirty-three SENs in system at the airbase. Due to the sheer volume of voice and data users, the 32nd had to deal with several problems it hadn't encountered in the past. The demand to call home for MWR purposes, or to call back to bases in the United States or Europe, increased significantly.

Task Force Warhorn then took the initiative to move towards much-needed network integration with commercial equipment to ease the problem. Additionally, the Warhorn battalion worked with our brethren from the United States Air Force's 32nd Combat Comms Squadron, who brought a tactical data package to the fight, and improved connectivity to the LSA.

The battalion's performance during Operation Iraqi Freedom was a factor in the removal of the Iraqi government of Saddam Hussein, and his eventual capture. In October 2005, the 32nd Signal Battalion deployed to LSA Anaconda with C Company reporting to Camp Victory and other outlining camps around Baghdad<Soldier of 32nd Signal Battalion>, Iraq, for a year's rotation in Operation Iraqi Freedom 05-07.

== Unit deactivation ==
On 22 May 2007, the 32nd Signal Battalion was deactivated.

== Units, commendation, and campaign credits ==
Subunits	Decorations	Campaign credits
Headquarters and Headquarters Company – Outlaws	Meritorious Unit Commendation, streamer embroidered EUROPEAN THEATER	Normandy
Headquarters and Headquarters Company – Outlaws	Meritorious Unit Commendation, streamer embroidered EUROPEAN THEATER	Northern France
Alpha Company – Warriors originally known as Eagles	Meritorious Unit Commendation, Operation Iraqi Freedom	Rheinland
Bravo Company – Bulldawgs	Meritorious Unit Commendation, streamer embroidered EUROPEAN THEATER	Ardennes
Charlie Company – Charlie Rock	Presidential Unit Citation, Operation Iraqi Freedom 1, Two Meritorious Unit Commendation's for Operation Iraqi Freedom 1 and Operation Iraqi Freedom 05-07	Central Europe
Delta Company – Devils originally known as Dragons	Army Superior Unit Award	Pacific Theater, no inscription
Motto:	"Sound the Warhorns!"	
