= 326th Engineer Battalion (United States) =

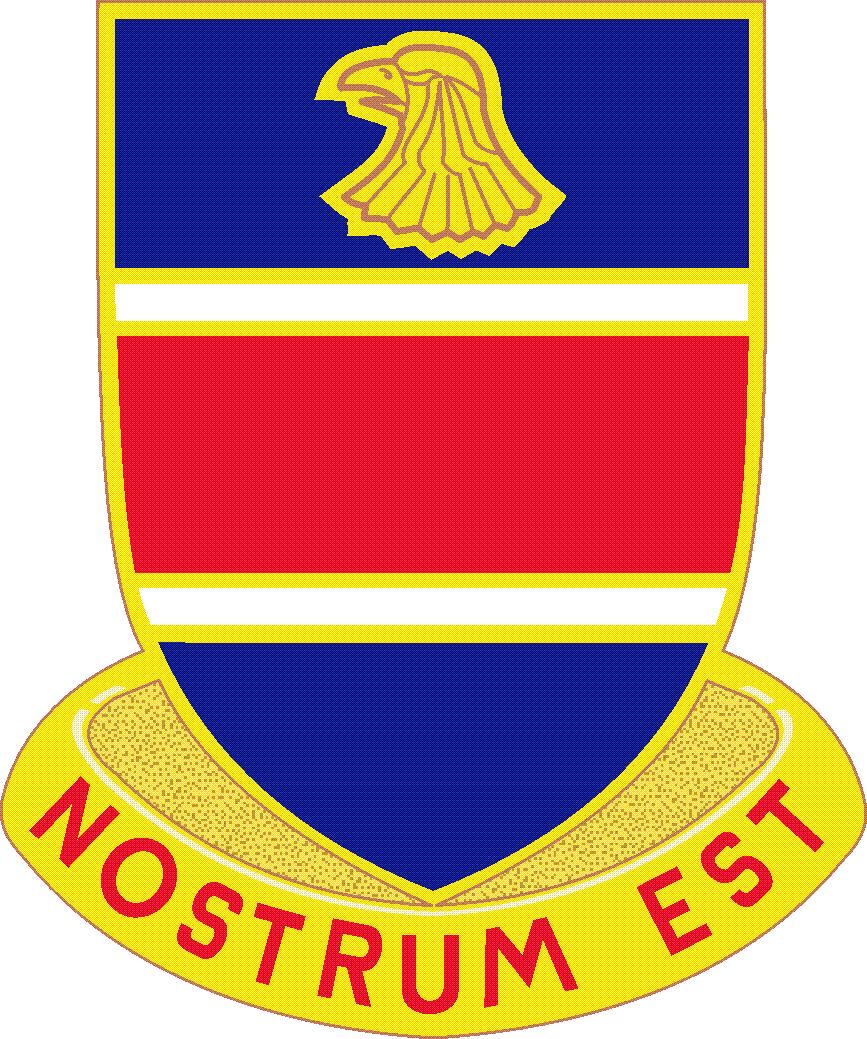
- 326th Engineer Battalion's distinctive unit insignia
- Active: 23 July 1918–present
- Country: United States
- Branch: United States Army
- Size: Battalion
- Part of: 101st Airborne Division
- Headquarters: Fort Campbell, Kentucky
- Nickname(s): "Sapper Eagles" (special designation)
- Color of Beret: Black
- Engagements: World War II: Normandy (with arrowhead); Northern France; Rhineland (with arrowhead); Ardennes-Alsace; Central Europe; Vietnam: Counteroffensive, Phase III; Tet Counteroffensive; Counteroffensive, Phase IV; Counteroffensive, Phase V; Counteroffensive, Phase VI; Tet 69/Counteroffensive; Summer-Fall 1969; Winter-Spring 1970; Sanctuary Counteroffensive; Counteroffensive, Phase VII; Consolidation I; Consolidation II; Southwest Asia: Defense of Saudi Arabia; Liberation and Defense of Kuwait; War on Terrorism: Campaigns to be determined
- Website: 101st Airborne Division official homepage

Insignia
- Background trimming

- Beret flash

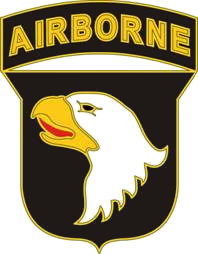
- Combat service identification badge

The 326th Division Engineer Battalion (Sapper Eagles) was one of three air assault engineer battalions in the United States Army. The 326th is now the 101st Airborne Division's division-level engineer battalion and has been a part of the 101st since World War I.

== Lineage ==
The 326th Engineer Battalion's lineage of record:

- Constituted 23 July 1918 in the National Army as the 326th Engineers and assigned to the 101st Division
- Reconstituted 24 June 1921 in the Organized Reserves as the 326th Engineers and assigned to the 101st Division
- Organized in November 1921 at Milwaukee, Wisconsin
- Regiment broken up 31 March 1942 and its elements reorganized as the 326th Engineer Battalion and remained assigned to the 101st Division
- 326th Engineer Battalion withdrawn 15 August 1942 from the Organized Reserves and allotted to the Army of the United States; concurrently redesigned as the 326th Airborne Engineer Battalion and activated at Camp Claiborne, Louisiana
- Inactivated 30 November 1945 in France
- Consolidated 18 June 1948 with the 49th Engineer Combat Battalion and consolidated unit redesigned as the 49th Airborne Engineer Battalion, an element of the 101st Airborne Division
- Allotted 25 June 1948 to the Regular Army
- Activated 6 July 1948 at Camp Breckinridge, Kentucky
- Inactivated 29 April 1949 at Camp Breckinridge, Kentucky
- Activated 25 August 1950 at Camp Breckinridge, Kentucky
- Inactivated 1 December 1953 at Camp Breckinridge, Kentucky
- Activated 15 May 1954 at Fort Jackson, South Carolina
- Redesignated 1 July 1956 as the 326th Airborne Engineer Battalion
- Redesignated 25 April 1957 as the 326th Engineer Battalion
- Inactivated 15 September 2004 at Fort Campbell, Kentucky, and relieved from assignment to the 101st Airborne Division Headquarters and Headquarters Company activated 19 October 2006 at Fort Campbell, Kentucky
- Assigned 17 April 2014 to the 1st Infantry Brigade Combat Team, 101st Airborne Division

== Decorations ==
The 326th Engineer Battalion's decorations of record:

- Presidential Unit Citation (Army), Streamer embroidered NORMANDY
- Presidential Unit Citation (Army), Streamer embroidered BASTOGNE
- Meritorious Unit Commendation (Army), Streamer embroidered SOUTHWEST ASIA 1990-1991
- Meritorious Unit Commendation (Army), Streamer embroidered IRAQ 2003-2004
- Meritorious Unit Commendation (Army), Streamer embroidered IRAQ 2007-2008
- Meritorious Unit Commendation (Army), Streamer embroidered SOUTHWEST ASIA 2011
- Army Superior Unit Award, Streamer embroidered 2001
- French Croix de Guerre with Palm, World War II, Streamer embroidered NORMANDY
- Netherlands Orange Lanyard
- Belgian Croix de Guerre 1940 with Palm, Streamer embroidered BASTOGNE; Cited in the Order of the Day of the Belgian Army for action at Bastogne
- Belgian Fourragere 1940
- Cited in the Order of the Day of the Belgian Army for action in France and Belgium
- Republic of Vietnam Cross of Gallantry with Palm, Streamer embroidered VIETNAM 1968-1969
- Republic of Vietnam Cross of Gallantry with Palm, Streamer embroidered VIETNAM 1971
- Republic of Vietnam Civil Action Honor Medal, First Class, Streamer embroidered VIETNAM 1968-1970

Company A additional entitled to:

- Presidential Unit Citation (Army), Streamer embroidered DAK TO
- Valorous Unit Award, Streamer embroidered TUY HOA
- Meritorious Unit Commendation (Army), Streamer embroidered VIETNAM 1966
- Republic of Vietnam Cross of Gallantry with Palm, Streamer embroidered VIETNAM 1966-1967

Company B additionally entitled to:

- Valorous Unit Award, Streamer embroidered THUA THIEN PROVINCE
- Meritorious Unit Commendation (Army), Streamer embroidered VIETNAM 1968

Company C additionally entitled to:

- Republic of Vietnam Cross of Gallantry with Palm, Streamer embroidered VIETNAM 1968
