= 440th Signal Battalion (United States) =

- Active: 18 March 1942 – 16 May 1956; 29 September 1961 – 2008
- Disbanded: 2008
- Country: United States
- Branch: United States Army
- Part of: 22nd Signal Brigade
- Nickname(s): Road Runners
- Motto(s): Maintaining Contact
- Engagements: World War II; Korean War; Iraq War: Operation Iraqi Freedom (2003 – 2004, 2005 – 2006)
- Decorations: Presidential Unit Citation; Meritorious Unit Commendation; Philippine Presidential Unit Citation; Korea Presidential Unit Citation

The 440th Signal Battalion is a battalion in the United States Army first constituted in 1942 and active in World War II and the Korean War.

== History lineage and honors ==
- 18 March 1942: Constituted in the Army of the United States as the "440th Signal Battalion".
- 25 March 1942: Activated at Geiger Field, Washington.
- 14 December 1942: Reorganized and redesignated as the "440th Signal Construction Battalion".
- 23 July 1944: Reorganized and redesignated as the "440th Signal Heavy Construction Battalion".
- 23 May 1951: Reorganized and redesignated as the "440th Signal Aviation Construction Battalion".
- 16 May 1956: Inactivated in South Korea.
- 29 September 1961: Redesignated as the "440th Signal Battalion", and allotted to the Regular Army.
- 1 October 1961: Activated in Kaiserslautern, Germany. The unit was stationed at Kleber Kaserne.
- 21 September 1972: Moved to Cambrai-Fritsch Kaserne at Darmstadt, Germany.
- 16 April 1980: Reassigned to V Corps as part of the 22nd Signal Brigade
- 2 January 1990: All units of the Battalion began field trials of MSE
- 15 January 1990: First successful MSE LOS shot from SEN to Node Center 12 by soldiers SFC Gregory, SPC Lockhart, PFC Ennen, PFC Adams PVT. Davis of Delta co.
- June 1991: 1st Plt Charlie Co participated in Operation Desert Shield in Kuwait June - September 1991.
- 2008: Deactivated at Darmstadt, Germany.

The "Road Runners" of the 440th Signal Battalion have participated in two missions to Bosnia, supporting Operations "Joint Endeavor", "Joint Guard" and "Joint Forge". They were also deployed to Kuwait and Iraq during Operation Iraqi Freedom in 2002–2004, and Operation Iraqi Freedom in 2005–2006.

== Campaign participation credit ==
World War II':

- Papua New Guinea
- Leyte
- Luzon

Korean War

- Chinese Communist Force Intervention
- First UN Counteroffensive
- Chinese Communist Force Spring Offensive
- Korea, Summer 1953
- Southwest Asia 2002–2004 & 2005–2006

"Company A" additionally entitled to
Korean War

- UN Defensive
- UN Offensive

== Decorations ==
- Presidential Unit Citation (Army), Streamer embroidered: "KOREA"
- Meritorious Unit Commendation (Army) Streamer embroidered: "PACIFIC THEATER"
- Air Force Outstanding Unit Award, Streamer embroidered: "KOREA"
- Philippine Presidential Unit Citation, Streamer embroidered: "17 October 1944 to 4 July 1945"
- Republic of Korea Presidential Unit Citation: Streamer embroidered, "KOREA 1950"
- Republic of Korea Presidential Unit Citation: Streamer embroidered, "KOREA 1950–1953"
- Army Superior Unit Award (Operation Joint Endeavor)

"Company A" additionally entitled to:

- Presidential Unit Citation (Army): Streamer embroidered, "PAPUA"
