= 17th Signal Battalion (United States) =

- 17th Signal Battalion coat of arms
- Active: 20 November 1942 – 18 February 1946; 5 July 1950 – 25 September 1965; 16 March 1981 – 17 August 2006
- Disbanded: 17 August 2006 (19 years ago)
- Country: United States
- Branch: United States Army
- Type: Tactical communications
- Role: Echelons Below Corps
- Part of: 22nd Signal Brigade
- Garrison/HQ: Kitzingen, Germany
- Motto(s): FONS COMMUNICATIONES (Fountain of Communications)
- Colors: Orange and white
- Engagements: Normandy; Northern France; Rhineland; Ardennes-Alsace; Central Europe; Desert Storm; Operation Iraqi Freedom

Commanders
- Notable commanders: LTC Glenn A. Kennedy, II

Insignia
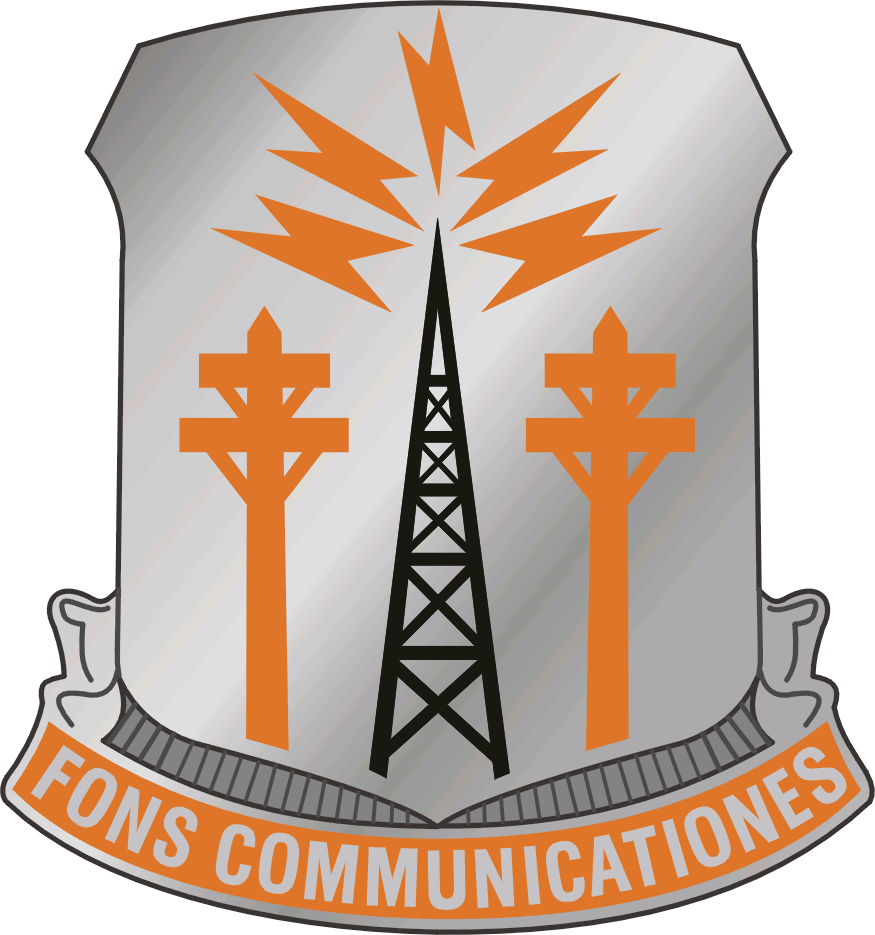
- Distinctive Unit Insignia

The 17th Signal Battalion of the United States Army was a MSE (Mobile Subscriber Equipment) equipped signal battalion based in Kitzingen, Germany (Larson Barracks). The battalion was one of three that made up the 22nd Signal Brigade, based in Darmstadt, Germany.

The battalion's mission statement was: "On order, 17th Signal Battalion rapidly deploys to provide signal support to V Corps in support of conventional or contingency operations."

The battalion was deactivated on 17 August 2006.

== Subunits ==
- HHC 17th Signal Battalion
- Alpha Company MSE Area Support
- Bravo Company MSE Area Support
- Charlie Company MSE Area Support
- Delta Company MSE Signal Support

== History ==
The 17th Signal Battalion was activated in the Army of the United States on 30 November 1942 at Camp Crowder, Missouri. From its activation until 20 October 1943, the battalion participated in the Second Army maneuvers. On 1 November 1943, the battalion was assigned to Headquarters, U.S. First Army, stationed in Patchway, England where its primary mission was to provide communications for First Army Headquarters. The battalion was then deployed and participated in the World War II campaigns of Normandy, Northern France, Rhineland, Ardennes-Alsace, and Central Europe.

Following World War II, the 17th Signal Battalion was inactivated at Camp Bowie, Texas. The Battalion was reactivated on 5 July 1950 at Karlsruhe, Germany, and again inactivated on 25 September 1965.

On 16 March 1981, the battalion was reactivated under the 22nd Signal Brigade at McNair Kaserne, Höchst, Germany, and entrusted with the mission of providing command and control communications to the US V Corps Commanding General and subordinate units. The Battalion's Charlie Company was located on Gibbs Kaserne and supported the V Corps Emergency Action Center located on the Abrams Complex. This area came to be known as "The Patio". Delta Company was formed and replaced Charlie Company at Gibbs Kaserne when Charlie Company rejoined the rest of the battalion located at McNair Kaserne until the battalion was deployed to Operation Desert Shield and Desert Storm. In December 1992, the entire battalion moved to their new home on Larson Barracks in Kitzingen, Germany. In 1993, Bravo Company (Signal), 11th Air Defense Artillery from Würzburg merged into the Battalion to become the 57th Signal Company.

In recent years the battalion has participated in Operations Desert Shield, Desert Storm, Deny Flight, Provide Hope and Joint Endeavor. In October 2002 the 17th Signal Battalion participated in Operation Internal Look and later deployed in support of Operations Iraqi Freedom and Enduring Freedom.

The battalion was inactivated on 17 August 2006. The unit's final commander was LTC Glenn A. Kennedy, II. Upon deactivation, the 17th Signal Battalion consisted of a Headquarters Company, three MSE Area Support Companies (Alpha, Bravo, and Charlie), and an MSE Signal Support Company (Delta).

== Lineage ==
- Constituted 1 November 1942 in the Army of the United States as the 17th Signal Operations Battalion
- Activated 30 November 1942 at Camp Crowder, Missouri
- Inactivated 18 February 1946 at Camp Bowie, Texas
- Redesignated 5 July 1950 as the 17th Signal Operation Battalion and activated in Germany
- Allotted 15 December 1950 to the Regular Army
- Reorganized and redesignated 20 October 1953 as the 17th Signal Battalion
- Inactivated 25 September 1965 in Germany
- Activated 16 March 1981 in Germany
- Inactivated 17 August 2006 in Germany

== Honors ==
=== Campaign participation credit ===
- World War II:
1. Normandy
2. Northern France
3. Rhineland
4. Ardennes-Alsace
5. Central Europe
- Southwest Asia:
1. Defense of Saudi Arabia
2. Liberation and Defense of Kuwait
3. Cease-Fire
4. Operation Enduring Freedom
5. Operation Iraqi Freedom I
6. Operation Iraqi Freedom III

=== Decorations ===
- Joint Meritorious Unit Award
- Army Superior Unit Award
