= 22nd Corps Signal Brigade =

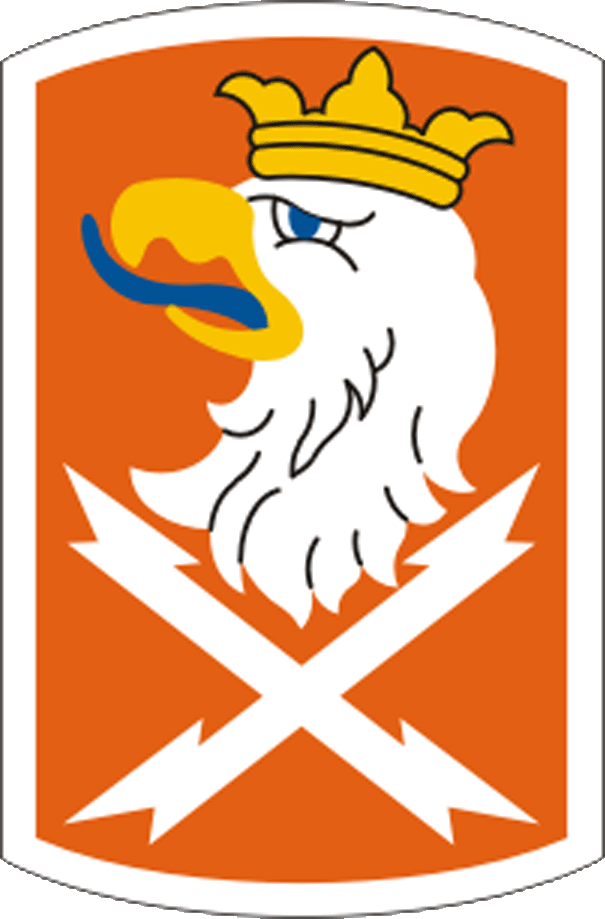
- 22nd Corps Signal Brigade shoulder sleeve insignia
- Active: 1945 – 1948; 1951 – 1955; 1964 – 1974; 1981 – 2007; 16 November 2021 – present
- Country: United States
- Branch: United States Army
- Type: Signal Corps
- Role: Expeditionary Communications
- Size: Brigade
- Part of: I Corps
- Garrison/HQ: Joint Base Lewis McChord, WA
- Motto: Voice of Courage!
- Mascot: Eagle (Griffin)
- Engagements: Korean War; Desert Storm; Iraq War
- Decorations: Meritorious Unit Citation

Commanders
- Brigade CDR: COL Joseph M. Kaminski
- Brigade CSM: CSM Anthony T. Hill

Insignia
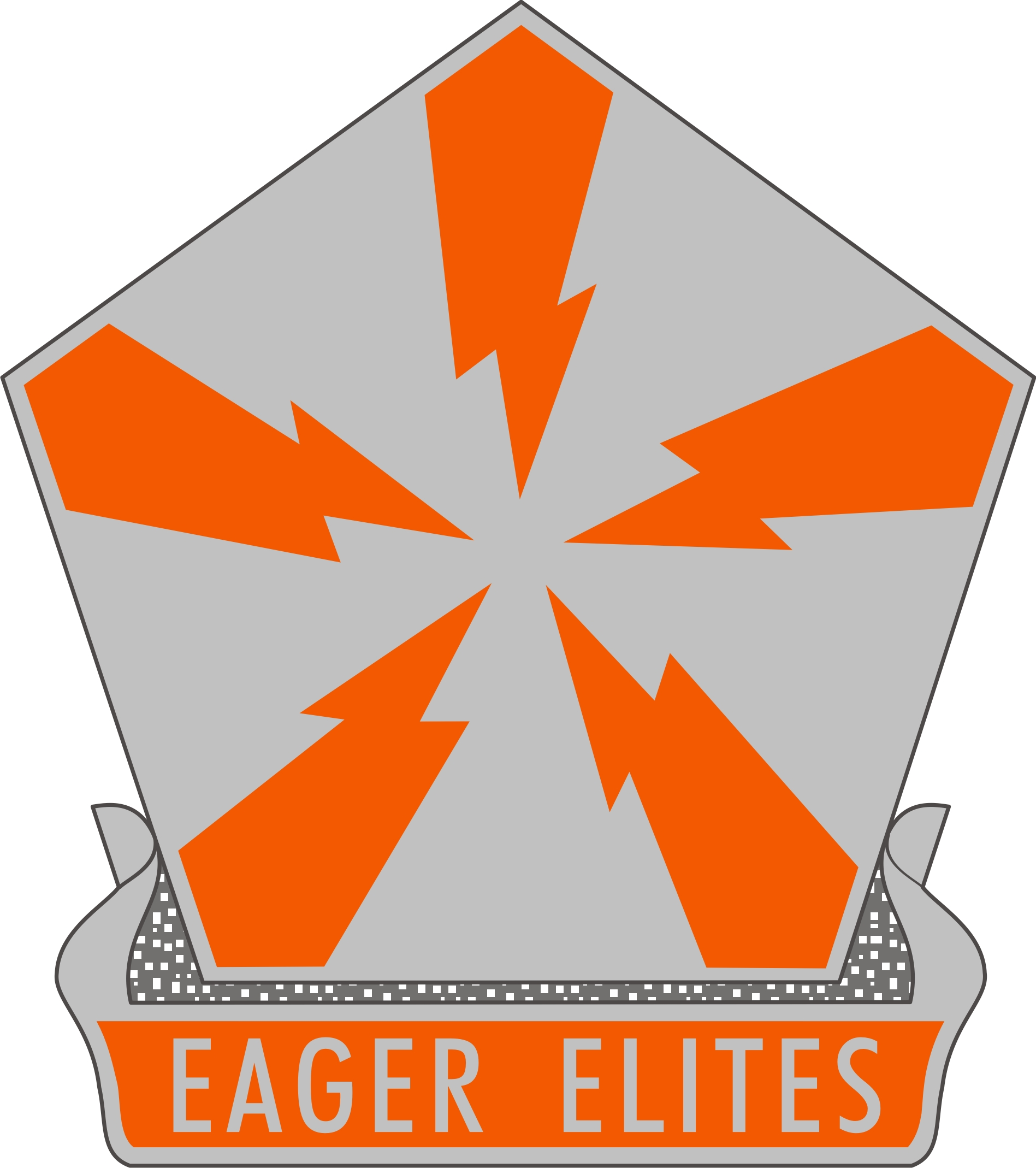
- Distinctive Unit Insignia

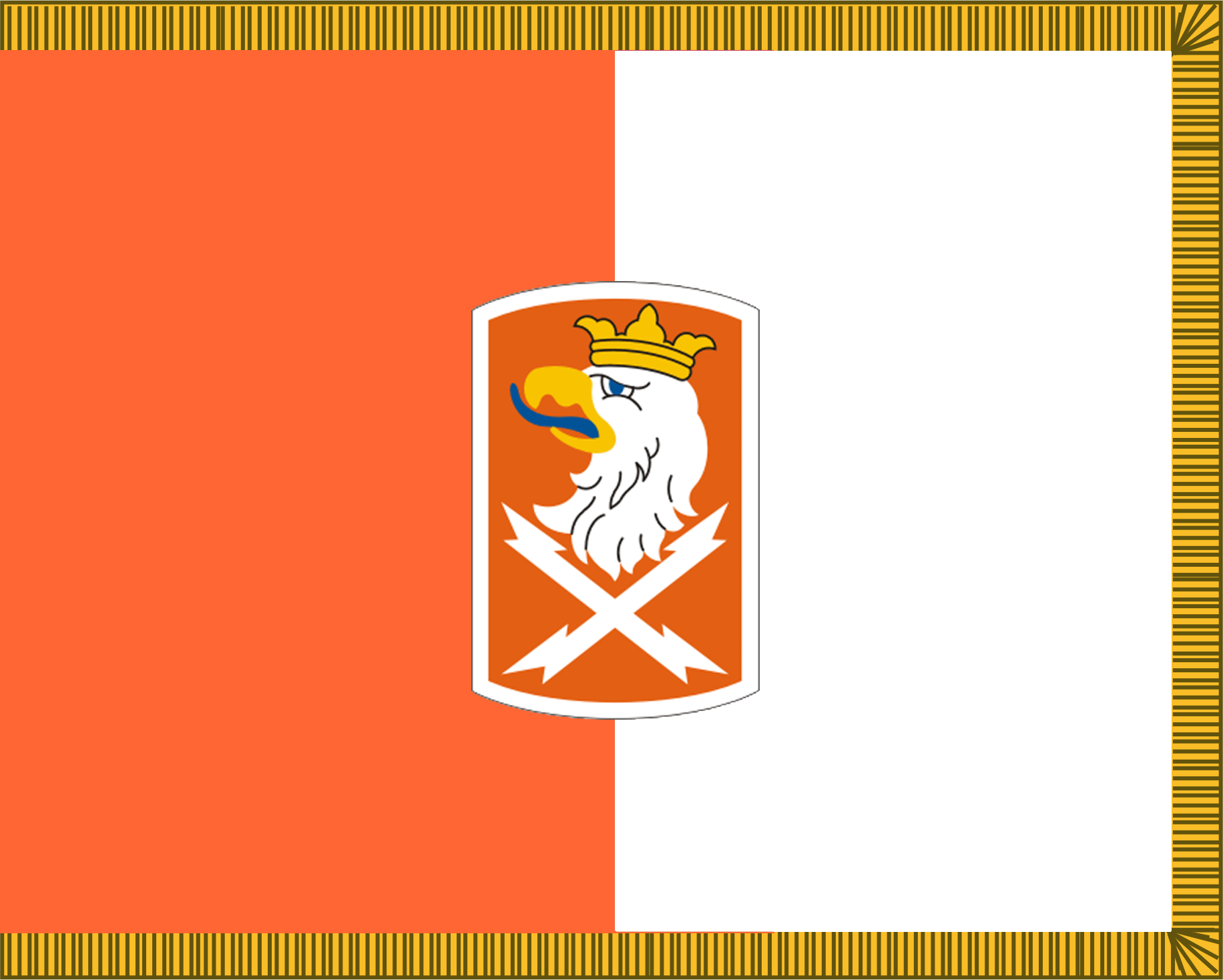
- 22nd Signal Brigade Flag

The 22nd Corps Signal Brigade is a US Army Signal Brigade located at Joint Base Lewis–McChord, Washington.

== Subunits ==
=== Current ===
- Headquarters & Headquarters Company
- 51st Expeditionary Signal Battalion

=== Former ===
Before their inactivation, the 22nd Signal Brigade had three active duty battalions and a headquarters company.

- 17th Signal Battalion (inactivated 17 August 2006)
- 32nd Signal Battalion (inactivated 22 May 2007)
- 440th Signal Battalion (inactivated 22 May 2007)

== History ==
=== Post war and Cold War ===
The 22nd Signal Brigade was constituted as Headquarters and Headquarters Company, 22nd Signal Service Group on 14 November 1945 with duties supporting the Army of Occupation, and later deactivated on 20 June 1948 while under the command of Colonel Frank J. Schaal.

On 27 September 1951, the unit was redesignated as Headquarters and Headquarters Company, 22nd Signal Group and allotted to the Regular Army. The Korean War saw the activation of 22nd Signal Group in October 1951. The 22nd Signal Group took part in five campaigns and was awarded the Meritorious Unit Commendation and Streamer, embroidered Korea. The Group was inactivated in Korea on 13 May 1955.

In February 1964, the newly reorganized 22nd Signal Group assumed its first operational mission by taking over the Edingen High Frequency Radio Station and eventually 43 planned frequency sites. By the time the last site was under the 22nd Signal Group's control in August 1964, the group had become a subordinate unit of the US Army Strategic Communications Command – Europe, thus severing its ties with United States Army Europe.

When France made the final decision to withdraw from NATO, the 22nd kept communication channels open to withdrawing US forces until 16 March 1967. The brigade was inactivated as a TO&E unit until 13 November 1967 and was organized under a Table of Distribution and Allowances (TDA) as the Signal Group 22, supporting United States Army commands until 12 August 1974, when Signal Group 22's colors were furled in Mannheim, Germany.

In April 1980, a provisional signal brigade was established. On 16 September 1980, the 22nd Signal Brigade was placed on the active rolls in an augmentation carrier status. A reorganization of the assets of the 32nd Signal Battalion (Corps) to create the Brigade Headquarters and the 17th Signal Battalion followed.

The 22nd Signal Brigade (Corps), a major subordinate command of Headquarters, V Corps, was activated on 16 March 1981 by its first commander, Colonel Theodore W. Hummel. The 22nd Signal Brigade consisted of three battalions: the 17th Signal Battalion (Command), the 32nd Signal Battalion (Radio) and the 440th Signal Battalion (Area). The brigade's headquarters, along with 17th and 32nd Signal Battalions, were headquartered in Hoechst, while the 440th Signal Battalion remained in Darmstadt. The V Corps G6 office was located with the V Corps Headquarters in Frankfurt.

=== Gulf War ===
In 1990, brigade soldiers (Charlie Company 17th Signal Battalion located at that time on Gibbs Kaserne in Frankfurt) in support of 143rd Signal Battalion 3rd Armored Division deployed to Saudi Arabia as part of Operation Desert Storm. The 22nd Signal Brigade was re-equipped with the Army's Mobile Subscriber Equipment in the Central Region of Germany immediately after Desert Storm and successfully weathered Army force reductions in USAREUR, reorganizing into its final structure.

In late 1993 the Brigade Headquarters began its physical relocation from Camp King in Oberüsel Germany to Kelly Barracks in Darmstadt Germany, along with its 32nd and 440th Signal Battalions. During this move the enlisted barracked soldiers of HHC and G6 were temporarily housed at the Ernest Ludwig Kaserne in Darmstadt, where they were the soul occupants of this small enclosed one square block military facility. The 17th Signal Battalion Headquarters was in Kitzingen, at Larson Barracks. The Corps G6 office was moved from Frankfurt to Heidelberg when the V Corps Headquarters moved there.

=== Balkans deployment ===
In 1995, under the operational command of the 1st Armored Division's Task Force Eagle, the 22nd Signal Brigade Headquarters, 440th Signal Battalion, elements of the 17th and 32nd Signal Battalions, and 1AD's 141st Signal Battalion, deployed to Bosnia and Herzegovina in support of Multi-National Division-North. Brigade Signaleers were the first elements to fly into Tuzla Airbase and cross the swollen Sava River during that first frozen December. The Brigade Task Force went on to install over 11 MSE node centers and over 43 small extension switching teams in support of US, Russian, Turk, and Nordic Polish forces throughout the Task Force Eagle area of operations in Bosnia. TFE Signaleers broke new ground in providing reliable voice, data, and video teleconferencing capabilities to MND-North's dispersed forces.

After returning to Germany in December 1996, the brigade quickly reestablished itself as the premier tactical signal brigade in the Army. The brigade has been at the leading edge of tactical and technological innovations while supporting a vigorous USAREUR and V Corps exercise and training program. Beginning in 1995, 22nd Signaleers were continuously deployed in support of both the 1st Infantry Division and 1st Armored Division in Bosnia, US EUCOM's national support element in Hungary and NATO's Task Force Able Sentry in Macedonia. In May 1998, the brigade once again deployed the 440th Signal Battalion to Bosnia as the 1st Armored Division's Task Force Eagle Signal Support Force. In 2003, the brigade deployed all of its battalions in support of Operation Iraqi Freedom.

=== Operation Iraqi Freedom (OIF1) ===
In November 2002, elements of the BDE HQ and 17th Signal Battalion, commanded by LTC Brian Moore, deployed to Kuwait in supporting V Corps RSO&I and combat rehearsals.

In January 2003, the remainder of 22nd Signal Brigade, consisting of 32nd Signal Battalion, commanded by LTC Laurie Buckhout/ CSM Graves, 440th Signal Battalion, commanded by LTC Mark Lessig / CSM Thomas Clark, and HHC 22nd Signal Brigade, commanded by CPT Stephen Chadwick / 1SG O'Neil deployed to Kuwait to join the forward element.

51st Signal Battalion (ABN), commanded by LTC Frank Penha, 514th Signal Company (ABN) commanded by CPT Mitch McKinney/1SG Alcides Melendez, and elements of C/50th Signal Battalion (ABN) joined 22nd Signal Brigade to create Task Force Signal.

The 22nd (minus 17th Sig) was staged at Camp Virginia with 17th staged at Camp New York.

17th Signal Battalion with A/32nd attached, commanded by CPT Marne Sutton/1SG Gary Potts, was given the initial mission to follow and support 3ID at the start of hostilities – crossing the berm into Iraq in the immediate hours of the operation. It was A/32nd who had the first WIA in the Bde - from mortar fire while supporting 3ID.

The Brigade Command team, COL Jeffery G. Smith / CSM Ray Lane, flew via rotary wing to the first Corps objective to support the V Corp assault CP / LTG Wallace, followed a day later by the 22nd Signal Assault CP and 440th Signal Battalion.

440th Signal Battalion began extending the corps network ICW 17th Signal Battalion who continued to follow and support 3ID and elements of the 101st Airborne Division (Air Assault) and 82nd Airborne Division.

The 32nd Signal Battalion provided comms to the V Corps Main CP at Camp Virginia through the ground campaign, while 51st Signal Battalion remained in reserve.

As 3ID / V Corps entered Baghdad, the 22nd Signal Brigade Assault CP entered the city setting up initially at the Baghdad International Airport (BIAP) before relocating to Al Faw Palace which later was renamed Camp Victory in honor of V Corps. It's here the 22nd Signal Brigade established their headquarters that would support operations for the remainder of OIF1. It was at Camp Victory where the brigade, ICW elements of the 11th Signal Brigade, established “Signal City” with a consolidated tent city, field DFAC and tactical AAFES store manned by signal Soldiers.

51st Signal Battalion was called-forward to Camp Victory IOT to establish comms in support of the V Corps Forward CP and other units arriving at Camp Victory and to the newly established CJTF HQ / US Embassy in the green zone. 17th Signal Battalion then consolidated operations in the vicinity of BIAP. When V Corps Main CP moved forward to Camp Victory, 32nd Signal Battalion moved forward to Balad Airbase supporting the key theater logistics hub.

In July 2003, the 234th Signal Battalion (Iowa Army National Guard) commanded by LTC Rusty Lingenfelter deployed and was attached to the 22nd Signal Brigade. Upon arrival in Baghdad, 234th Signal Battalion conducted a RIP with 17th Signal Battalion who then redeployed back to Kitzingen Germany to recover, reset, and refit in preparation for future combat operations.

As operations transitioned from direct combat, 440th Signal Battalion conducted a RIP with 51st Signal Battalion at Camp Victory and 51st Signal Battalion moved to Al Hillah (in the vicinity of the ancient city of Babylon) to support coalition operations as V Corps transitioned to CJTF-7. It was during this time that 440th Signal Battalion changed command with LTC Ed Drose taking command. It was also during this phase the Brigade suffered their first KIAs – SPC Arron Clark/440th Signal Battalion in December 2003 and SSG Ricky Crockett/51st Signal Battalion in January 2004 – both died by IED.

In February 2004, 3rd Signal Brigade arrived in Baghdad conducting a RIP with 22nd Signal Brigade who redeployed through Kuwait and then on to Darmstadt, Germany after 16 months of operations.

=== Operation Iraqi Freedom 05-07 ===
After returning to Darmstadt, Germany, 22nd Signal Brigade recovered, reconstituted, and retrained with V Corps on various exercises from 2004-2005. The Brigade again deployed to Iraq for its second brigade-wide deployment from October 2005-September 2006. The Brigade, Commanded by COL Frederick A. Cross and CSM Thomas J. Clark, formed the base of ‘TASK FORCE ADLER” which consisted of HHC, 22nd Signal Brigade, 32nd Signal Battalion, and 440th Signal Battalion all from Darmstadt, Germany, were joined by 29th Signal Battalion (Fort Lewis, WA), 40th Signal Battalion (Fort Huachuca, AZ), 136th Signal Battalion (Texas Army National Guard), and Delta Company, 111th Signal Battalion (South Carolina Army Reserves) and 842nd Signal Company (Florida Army Reserves) with over 3000 Soldiers at full strength. As one artifact states...”Forged in Combat, Task Force Adler set the stand for multi-discipline, full-spectrum sign support to combatant commanders. The Brigade's unmatched and unwavering commitment in support of OPERATION IRAQI FREEDOM 05-07 rotation, greatly contributed to the resounding success of Multi-National Corps Iraq, and the Multi-National Force Iraq in meeting their operational and strategic goals.”

The brigade returned to Darmstadt, Germany in September 2006 and began preparations for inactivation of V Corps and the brigade. On 22 May 2007, 22nd Signal Brigade along with 32nd Signal Battalion and 440th Signal Battalion, were inactivated, closing this chapter of "Victory's Voice!"

=== Reactivation ===
On 16 November 2021, the brigade was reactivated and redesignated as the 22nd Corps Signal Brigade (22 CSB) headquartered at Joint Base Lewis-McChord (JBLM). The brigade was assigned to FORSCOM as a Direct Reporting Unit and under Training Readiness Authority of America's I Corps. At a ceremony on 22 November 2021, 22 CSB assumed Command and Control of 51st Expeditionary Signal Battalion, co-located at JBLM. COL Charles D. (Dean) Smith and CSM Lisa M. Gandy assumed command of the brigade, both having served in the brigade previously. COL Smith served as the last HHC, 22nd Signal Brigade Company Commander during the last deployment and inactivated the brigade in Darmstadt in 2007. CSM Gandy served with 22nd Signal Brigade and also served as a Soldier in 51st Signal Battalion.

=== Conversion ===
In 2023, the brigade began the conversion of its only signal battalion, transforming 51st Expeditionary Signal Battalion into the 51st Expeditionary Signal Battalion-Enhanced (ESB-E). The conversion consisted of numerous reconfigurations and equipment modernizations efforts. This effort continues as new equipment is fielded.

=== Past Commanders ===
Name	Start	Finish	Relevant Events
COL Joel M. Feltz	JUL 2024	JUL 2026	
COL Charles D. Smith	AUG 2021	JUL 2024	Reactivated Brigade under I Corps, Operation Spartan Shield
COL Fredrick A. Cross	JUN 2004	MAY 2007	Operation Iraqi Freedom 05-07; Inactivated Brigade
COL Jeffery G. Smith	JUL 2002	JUN 2004	Operation Iraqi Freedom
COL William T. Lasher	JUL 2000	JUL 2002	
COL Benjamin F. Fletcher	JUL 1998	JUL 2000	
COL Gregory J. Premo	JUL 1996	JUL 1998	Returned Brigade From Bosnia
COL James D. Culbert	JUL 1994	JUL 1996	Deployed Brigade to Bosnia
COL Jerry W. McElwee	JUL 1992	JUL 1994	
Others needed to be identified			
COL Theodore S. Hummel	MAR 1981		Reactivated Brigade under V Corps
COL Donald R. Hodges	1963		
LTC Sable	1963		
LTC Martin O.F. Schroeder	1963		

=== Past Command Sergeants Major ===
Name	Start	Finish	Relevant Events
CSM Anthony T. Hill	DEC 2025	Current	
CSM Daniel P. Costello	OCT 2023	OCT 2025	Operation Spartan Shield
CSM Lisa M. Gandy	OCT 2021	OCT 2023	Reactivated the Brigade under I Corps
CSM Thomas J. Clark	JUN 2004	MAY 2007	Operation Iraqi Freedom, Inactivated Brigade, Retired as Signal Regiment SGM
CSM Ray D. Lane	JUN 2002	JUN 2004	Operation Iraqi Freedom, Retired as CSM of CECOM
CSM Lonnie Wimberly	JUL 1997	JUL 1999	
CSM Wilber Graham, Jr.	JUL 1994	JUL 1996	
CSM Marion S. Howell	SEP 1983	SEP 1986	Retired as CECOM CSM
