= LandWarNet =

LandWarNet (LWN) is the United States Army’s contribution to the Global Information Grid (GIG) that consists of all globally interconnected, end-to-end sets of Army information capabilities, associated processes, and personnel for collecting, processing, storing, disseminating, and managing information on demand supporting warfighters, policy makers, and support personnel. It includes all Army (owned and leased) and leveraged Department of Defense (DOD)/Joint communications and computing systems and services, software (including applications), data security services, and other associated services. LandWarNet exists to enable the warfighter through Mission Command, previously described as Battle Command. Other U.S. service equivalent efforts to LandWarNet include the Navy's "FORCEnet" and the Air Force's "C2 Constellation."

== Defining LandWarNet ==
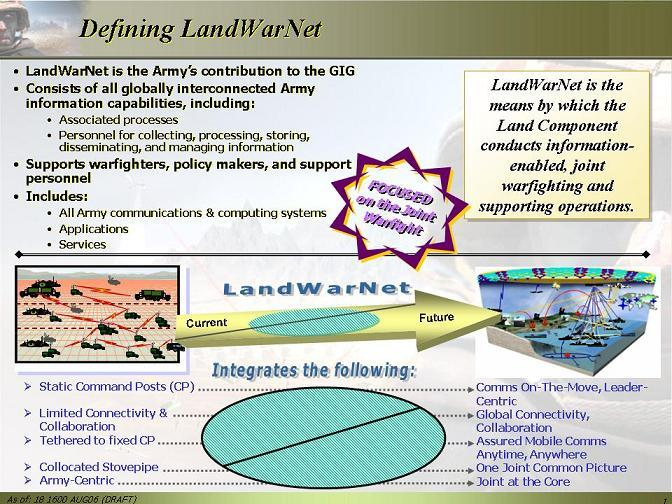

Office of the Army Chief Information Officer/G6. As the Army lead: provides the knowledge and strategy to shape and develop LandWarNet from top (strategic) to bottom (tactical).

A key document shaping the capability development (expectation) for LandWarNet is Military Operations Future Operating Capabilities. This pamphlet describes Force Operating Capabilities (FOC) desired for the U.S. Army near, mid and long term, encompassing the full spectrum of military operations, derived from analysis of joint concepts, Army Future Force concepts, and other documents developed in support of the National Military Strategy (NMS), Strategic Planning Guidance (SPG), Army Strategic Planning Guidance (ASPG), the Army Transformation Road Map (ATR), and the Army Campaign Plan (ACP).

LandWarNet is essentially the combination of the set of functional applications (for mission command, Intelligence, Logistics, etc.), transmitted over integrated network transport (space, airborne, terrestrial, infrastructure, network terminal), utilizing a common set of network services (voice, data, collaboration, mediation, storage, discovery, messaging, speed of service, quality of service, hosting, IA/Security, NetOps - information assurance, information dissemination management, and network management). LandWarNet also represents the Army’s unified, coherent network capabilities development effort to bring the pieces together. The focus of this effort is providing Soldiers, leaders and units, today and in the future, the means to conduct information-enabled, joint warfighting and supporting operations.

== Cylinder slide depicting LandWarNet ==
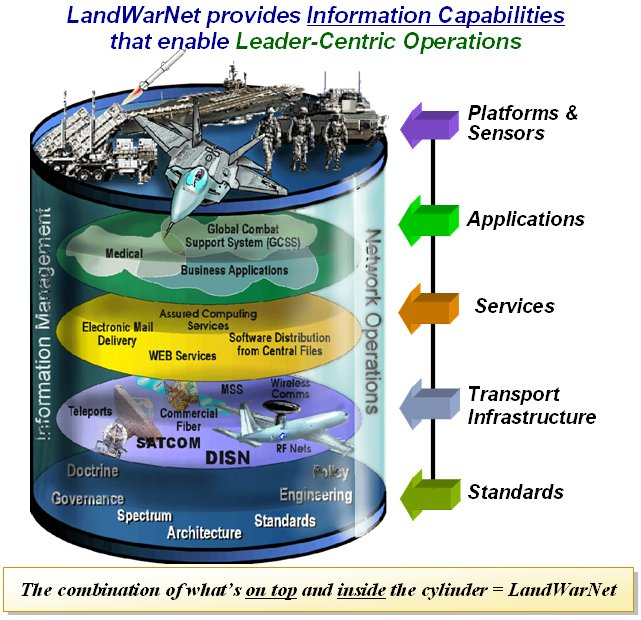

LandWarNet, underpinned by integrated architectures enables, “one Mission Command System” as part of “one Network” and facilitates a consistent alignment of joint capabilities across all layers of the network (platforms & sensors, applications, services, transport and standards) to design and field an integrated system of systems. This network provides the link from Soldier to sustaining base, with tailored software applications that are optimized for conducting joint operations.

== History ==
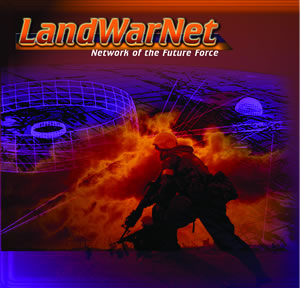
LandWarNet "The Army’s network capabilities will continue to emerge and mature. LandWarNet will capture these emerging capabilities, encompassing the evolving battle command technologies, and link communications, information management and decision support."

GEN Byrnes (CG TRADOC) back in November 2003 determined the Army needed a single name to represent all tactical networks, both current and future. His assessment was based on the numerous questions asked of him at the JFCOM Component Commanders Conference (senior generals and admirals forum) during a discussion on Army networks. The task of finding the right name was given to the Battle Command and Awareness Division (BCAD) within TRADOC's Futures Center Directorate. There were numerous suggestions in the staffing process, but the name "LandWarNet" stood out. The name was inspired by the JTF WARNET Program under the Extending the Littoral Battlespace (ELB) Advanced Concept Technology Development (ACTD) at that time. From Nov 03 to Jan 04, the name "LandWarNet" initially represented all current and future tactical networks. The name caught on within a relatively short time with the other services and DoD during the Joint Battle Management Command and Control (JBMC2) document review process. In Feb 2004, the CIO/G6 for the Army incorporated the name to represent all current and future Army networks. The name had greater appeal and "traction" in military circles and at the Congressional level than the previous name for the Army network i.e. the Army Knowledge Enterprise (AKE).

== Operational capabilities ==
- U.S. Army Strategic Communications Guide 2007

• LandWarNet (LWN) is the Army’s part of the DoD information technology infrastructure that enables operational forces’ to "reach back" for data, in the form of high definition intelligence products, voice, video, and data.
• LWN is a combination of infrastructure and services, and moves information through a seamless network and enables the management of warfighting and business information.
• LWN is a key enabler for information superiority, decision superiority, and ultimately full spectrum dominance, as well as for quality and speed of decision-making for enhanced Battle Command.
• LWN integrates applications, services, and network transport across the warfighting, intelligence, and business domains enabling Leader-centric operations anytime, anywhere at every echelon as a part of the Joint Force.
• LWN enables enhanced Battle Command across the full spectrum of conflict (land and cyberspace) and support to natural disasters.
• LWN creates unprecedented levels of flexibility and agility for logistical support, actionable intelligence, and situational awareness.
• LWN will push voice, data, and video to the edge of the tactical formations—ultimately pushing these capabilities lower and lower into our modular Army’s brigades, battalions, and Soldiers - enabling distributed operations required in today’s and future operations.
• Recent combat operations highlight the critical need for mobile communications, networks, and satellite communications (for range extension) to provide interoperability within the Joint force and within the defense communications network infrastructure
• Networked communications, as demonstrated by the Joint Network Node (JNN) system and Blue Force Tracking, enhance the speed of command and increase the Warfighter’s ability to plan and execute operations over a geographically dispersed battlespace.
• The fielding, integration and migration of robust Battle Command systems to deployed and deployable units continues to be a primary focus for the Army.
• LWN integrates applications, services, and network transport across the warfighting, intelligence, and business domains enabling Leader-centric operations anytime, anywhere at every echelon as a part of the Joint Force.
• LWN enables enhanced Battle Command across the full spectrum of conflict (land and cyberspace) and support to natural disasters.
• LWN creates unprecedented levels of flexibility and agility for logistical support, actionable intelligence, and situational awareness.

== Institutional infrastructure ==
TRADOC Pamphlet 525-5-600, The LandWarNet Concept of Operations (CONOPS) was signed by the Director, ARCIC on 11 February 2008.

U.S. Army Strategic Communications Guide 2007

• LandWarNet(LWN) is the Army’s part of the DoD information technology infrastructure that enables Soldiers to "reach back" for data, in the form of high definition intelligence products, voice, video, and data.

• LWN is the Army's portion of the DoD Global Information Grid (GIG)

• LWN move information through a seamless network to better supports Soldiers and the infrastructure that supports them.

• LWN is a combination of infrastructure and services, and moves information through a seamless network and enables command and control, and the management of warfighting and business information.

• The Army is transforming data, applications, and processes to achieve knowledge sharing that optimizes decision making, mission planning, and performance across the Army.

• The Army is consolidating IT network services at Area Processing Centers to increase LWN efficiency and effectiveness and reduce network vulnerabilities.

• LWN is managed, defended, and operated as part of the enterprise global information network

== See also ==
- Department of Defense Architecture Framework (DODAF)
