= 1973 raid on the Iraqi embassy in Pakistan =

Armed raid by Pakistani forces on the Iraqi embassy in Islamabad

1973 raid on the Iraqi embassy
- Part of Fourth Balochistan conflict
- Balochistan in Pakistan
- Operational scope: Iraqi support for Baloch nationalist insurgents/militants; Iraqi assistance to Balochi insurgents with smuggling of covert Soviet weapons shipments
- Location: Islamabad, Pakistan; 33.7335215°N 73.1273680°E
- Planned by: Pakistan Intelligence Community
- Target: (Iraq) Iraqi embassy
- Date: Iraqi embassy, Islamabad, Pakistan (UTC+05:00 PKT)
- Executed by: Pakistan; Civil Armed Forces; Pakistan Rangers; Pakistani law enforcement; Islamabad Police
- Outcome: Pakistan discovered 300 Soviet-made machine guns with an excess of 50,000 rounds of ammunition and a large amount of funding intended for Baloch militants.; Deterioration of Iraq–Pakistan relations; Pakistani counter-insurgency; Pakistani support for Iran in the Iran–Iraq War

The 1973 raid on the Iraqi embassy in Pakistan was an armed infiltration carried out by Government of Pakistan on 10 February 1973 at the embassy of Ba'athist Iraq in Islamabad. The raid, carried out by the Civil Armed Forces, including Pakistan Rangers and the Islamabad Police, was launched after the interception of information by Pakistani intelligence that uncovered large-scale covert Iraqi involvement in the supply of weapons and funds to militants waging an insurgency against Imperial State of Iran and Pakistan in the Balochistan region situated between the two countries.

Following the embassy raid, an abundance of funds and Soviet armaments from Iraq that were meant for Baloch insurgents were seized by Pakistani forces, and the Iraqi ambassador to Pakistan as well as the embassy's staff were immediately expelled from Pakistan and declared personae non gratae.

Pakistan's findings in the embassy raid heightened tensions between Iran and Iraq, which, in 1974, escalated into armed clashes over the Shatt al-Arab, a river that was formerly subject to a territorial dispute between the two nations that later served as one of the key factors that propelled them into a full-scale and protracted war in 1980 following the Iranian Revolution.

The event led to a severe deterioration in Iraq–Pakistan relations and contributed to Pakistan's heavy backing of Iran during the latter's eight-year-long war with Iraq.

== Background ==
Relations between Baloch separatists and Ba'athist Iraq had historical roots and were strong up until the 2003 U.S.-led invasion of Iraq. Following the Indo-Pakistani War of 1971, Iraq had begun to collaborate with the Soviet Union in launching a covert operation to provide military aid to Baloch insurgents operating in Pakistan and Iran. The aim of this operation was to destabilize the two countries by helping dissident Baloch rebels in their fight against the Iranian and Pakistani states that were close allies with the United States. The operation remained modestly successful during the early 1970s, but ultimately failed when there was unrest amongst the Baloch nationalist leaders involved in the insurgency due to internal disputes. This disorder accompanied by an extremely tough crackdown by the Pakistan Army (supported by Iran) in its Balochistan province crippled the joint Iraqi-Soviet attempts to destabilize the two key U.S. allies in the region and pave the way for Iraq's dominance over Iran as well as more favourable circumstances for India against Pakistan, with the goal of the region completely falling under the Soviet sphere of influence. The disputes took place when Baloch politicians Ghaus Bakhsh Bizenjo and Ataullah Mengal of the National Awami Party refused to accept the demands of Akbar Bugti to establish himself as the Governor of the Pakistani Province of Balochistan.

== Operation ==
At midnight on 9 February 1973, Akbar Bugti informed Pakistani authorities about a covert Soviet weapons shipment intended for Baloch insurgents that had been smuggled into the country with Iraqi assistance. He reported that the weapons were being kept at the Iraqi embassy in Islamabad. On 10 February 1973, Pakistani police and paramilitary forces began to prepare an operation to raid the Iraqi embassy. After a few hours of planning, a raid was conducted by the Pakistan Rangers, accompanied by the Islamabad Police to storm the embassy and seize any means of support for the rebels. The raid was a success, and Pakistani forces discovered 300 Soviet-made submachine guns with more than 50,000 rounds of ammunition and a large amount of funding intended for Baloch militants.

== Aftermath ==
Following the raid, the Baloch nationalist leader Sher Mohammad Marri paid a formal visit to Baghdad. Newspapers widely reported that the Soviet arms were intended to be given to Baloch separatists in their fight against Pakistan and Iran to further fuel tensions between the dissident tribes against the two nations. Media outlets throughout Pakistan predicted that the discovery of these weapons would muster greater support for the government from other ethnic groups in the country. Supported by Iranian forces, Pakistan launched a large-scale military operation against Baloch rebels shortly after this incident. This counter-insurgency operation finally ended in 1977 after the insurgency/rebellion was largely crushed and left disheartened. Despite this setback, Iraq continued to undertake covert activities to empower Baloch nationalists and attempt to destabilize Pakistan and Iran. The culmination of tensions between Iran (a key U.S. ally with a developed economy and the fifth-largest military in the world at the time) and Iraq would eventually reach an extreme point after the 1979 Iranian Revolution and subsequent Iran-Iraq War, in which Pakistan would provide the Iranians with covert support and inflict major losses on invading Iraqi forces.

== See also ==
- Iraq-Pakistan relations
- Iran-Iraq relations
- Iran-Pakistan relations
- Balochistan Province, Pakistan
- Baloch people
- Sistan and Baluchestan Province, Iran
- Insurgency in Balochistan
- Embassy of Pakistan, Baghdad
