= Arvand =

The Arvand River may refer to:

- Arvand Free Zone, a zone that surrounds Khorramshahr, Abadan, and Minoo Island along the Arvand River waterway in Iran
- Shatt al-Arab, also known as Arvand Rud, a river in Southwest Asia formed by the confluence of the Euphrates and the Tigris
- Another name for the Alvand mountain range in Iran
