= Operation Revenge =

1980 Iranian operation in the Iran–Iraq War

- Part of Iran–Iraq War
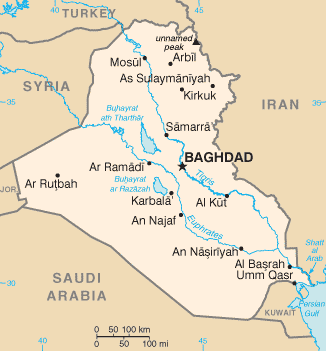
- Type: Military strike
- Location: Southern Iraq
- Planned by: Javad Fakoori
- Target: Sho'aibiyeh airbase (Basra); Kut airbase (Maysan)
- Date: 22 September 1980; 16:30–17:25
- Executed by: Islamic Republic of Iran: Air Force
- Outcome: Iranian tactical failure: Airstrikes dealt insignificant damage

Operation Revenge or Operation Entegham (Persian: عملیات انتقام) was an operation during the Iran–Iraq War, which was launched by the Islamic Republic of Iran Air Force on 22 September 1980. The commencement of the operation was about 2 hours after the formal outbreak of the Iran–Iraq War which was started by the attacks of Iraqi forces. In the operation, 8 Iranian fighter jets bombed 2 Iraqi military bases.

In the operation, two wings (air groups) by the name of "Alborz" and "Alfard" from the 3rd fighter base of Hamedan and the 6th fighter base of Bushehr were involved in the battle against Iraqi forces.

The Iranian pilot Colonel Javad Fakoori was the commander of the Islamic Republic of Iran Air Force, and swiftly announced an emergency after the initial Iraqi attacks and recalled all senior commanders of Nahaja (IRIAF) to Tehran; he declared in a formal meeting the necessity of a decisive/fast response to the attacks.

During the operation, the first wing of Iranian fighter bases - Alborz base - flew at 16:30 and bombed Sho'aibiyeh air (military) base which is located in Basra Governorate; afterwards another wing (Alfard) flew at 17:25 and bombed Kut air base in Maysan Governorate. During this operation (beside Operation Kaman 99), Iraqi economic/military centers were hit by 140 Iranian fighter planes.

== See also ==
- 22 September 1980 Iraqi airstrike on Iran
- Operation Kaman 99
