= 1974–1975 Shatt al-Arab conflict =

Armed border clash between Iran and Iraq

Coordinates: 30°24′26″N 48°09′06″E

1974–1975 Arvand River conflict
- Part of the Shatt al-Arab dispute and the Second Iraqi–Kurdish War
Date	April 1974 – March 1975 (11 months)
Location	Shatt al-Arab
Result	Iranian victory: 1975 Algiers Agreement; Iraq cedes half of the Shatt al-Arab to Iran; Iraqi government reinstates full control over Kurdish-majority territories; Tensions between Iran and Iraq escalate into a full-scale war in 1980
Territorial changes	Iran consolidates control over the Shatt al-Arab along the Iran–Iraq border

Belligerents
Iran KDP	Iraq

Commanders and leaders
Mohammad Reza Pahlavi Mustafa Barzani	Saddam Hussein

Strength
50,000 irregulars; ~100 aircraft (min.)	90,000 troops; 1,200 tanks and AFVs; 200 aircraft

Casualties and losses
- 1,000+ killed or wounded (total)

The 1974–1975 Shatt al-Arab conflict consisted of armed cross-border clashes between Iran and Iraq. It was a major escalation of the Shatt al-Arab dispute, which had begun in 1936 due to opposing territorial claims by both countries over the Shatt al-Arab, a transboundary river that runs partly along the Iran–Iraq border. The conflict took place between April 1974 and March 1975, and resulted in over 1,000 total casualties for both sides combined, though the Iranians eventually came to hold a strategic advantage over the Iraqis. Open hostilities formally came to an end with the 1975 Algiers Agreement, in which Iraq ceded around half of the border area containing the waterway in exchange for Iran's cessation of support for Iraqi Kurdish rebels.

== Background ==
Qajar Iran had repudiated the demarcation line established in the Persian Gulf by the Anglo-Ottoman Convention of 1913, and argued that the Iran–Iraq border in the Shatt al-Arab should be demarcated according to the thalweg principle. In 1934, the Hashemite Kingdom of Iraq, encouraged by the United Kingdom, took Pahlavi Iran to the League of Nations, but the dispute was not resolved. In 1937, Iran and Iraq signed their first official boundary treaty, which established the waterway border on the eastern bank of the river and excluded a four-mile anchorage zone near Abadan—which was allotted to Iran—where the border ran along the thalweg. In 1958, Iraq's Hashemite monarchy was overthrown in a coup d'état known as the 14 July Revolution, which established the First Iraqi Republic. In 1968, another coup d'état—staged by the Arab Socialist Ba'ath Party and known as the 17 July Revolution—deposed the First Iraqi Republic and firmly established a Ba'athist regime in Iraq. Shortly afterwards, Iran sent a delegation of diplomats to Iraq in 1969, and when the erstwhile Iraqi government refused to proceed with negotiations over a new treaty, Iran withdrew the treaty of 1937. The Iranian abrogation of the 1937 treaty marked the beginning of a period of acute tension in Iran–Iraq relations. In 1973, a raid on the Iraqi embassy in Pakistan uncovered large-scale covert Iraqi involvement in the supply of weapons and funds to militants waging an insurgency against Iran and Pakistan in Balochistan, further heightening the tensions between Iran and Iraq. This period of tensions lasted until the 1975 Algiers Agreement.

== Events ==
From March 1974 to March 1975, Iran and Iraq fought border skirmishes sparked over Iran's support of Iraqi Kurds, who were engaged in an insurgency against the Arab-majority Iraqi state for secession and the establishment of an independent Kurdish state. In 1975, the Iraqis launched a small military incursion into Iran, spearheaded with tank columns; this incursion was defeated by the Iranians, after which several other attacks took place. However, Iran had the world's fifth-largest military at the time and promptly defeated the Iraqi military with its air power, while continuing to frustrate the Iraqis domestically with its arming of Kurdish separatists alongside its erstwhile close allies: the United States and Israel. Some 1,000 people died as a result of the 1974–75 conflict around the Shatt al-Arab, and Iraq was ultimately unable to gain any advantage against Iran.

Consequently, Iraq decided against continuing the conflict, and chose instead to make concessions to Iran to end the Kurdish rebellion. In the 1975 Algiers Agreement, Iraq made territorial concessions—including the Shatt al-Arab waterway—in exchange for normalized bilateral relations. In return for Iraq recognizing that the frontier on the waterway ran along the entire thalweg as per Iran's argument, the latter ended its support for Iraqi Kurdish guerrillas.

== Aftermath ==
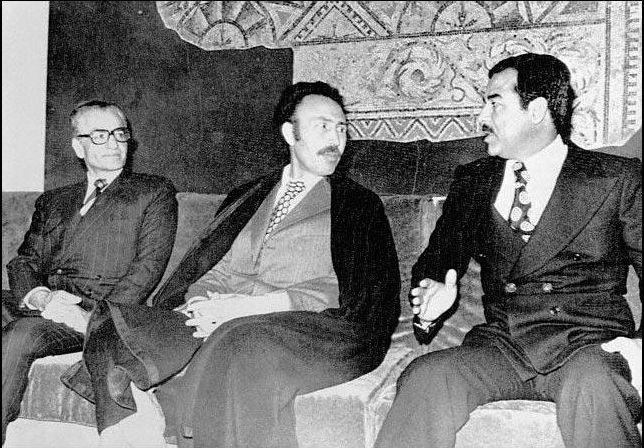
From left to right: Mohammad Reza Pahlavi, Houari Boumédiène and Saddam Hussein in Algiers, 1975

On 17 September 1980, Iraq abrogated the 1975 Algiers Agreement after Iranian forces shelled a number of Iraqi border posts on 4 September following the 1979 Iranian Revolution, which overthrew the Shah and established an Islamic theocracy. Iraqi President Saddam Hussein claimed that the newly-established Islamic Republic of Iran had refused to abide by the stipulations of the Algiers Accords and Iraq therefore considered them null and void. Tensions began to run high between the two states as Iraq's ruling Ba'ath Party feared that Ruhollah Khomeini was attempting to export the Iranian Revolution to Iraq by inciting the latter's Shia-majority population into revolting against the secular and Arab nationalist government. Five days later, the Iraqi military launched a major offensive and invaded Iran, sparking the Iran–Iraq War.

== See also ==
- Joint Operation Arvand
- Shatt al-Arab dispute
- Second Iraqi–Kurdish War
- Iran–Iraq War
- Iran–Iraq relations
- Arab League–Iran relations
- Iranian Revolution
