= Omar al-Hazzaa =

Iraqi military officer (died 1990)

Omar al-Hazzaa (died 1990) was an Iraqi military lieutenant-general. He belonged to the same clan as Saddam Hussein. He began criticizing Hussein in 1980, because of the Iraqi invasion of Iran. Ten years later, in 1990, he was executed after criticizing him for the Iraqi invasion of Kuwait. Prior to his execution, his tongue was mutilated. In retaliation, his nephew, Ra'ad al-Hazaa, attempted to assassinate Saddam's son Uday, in Baghdad on December 12, 1997.
