= September 1980 Iraqi airstrikes on Iran =

Opening attacks of the Iran–Iraq War

September 1980 Iraqi strikes on Iran
- Part of Iraqi invasion of Iran and Iran–Iraq War
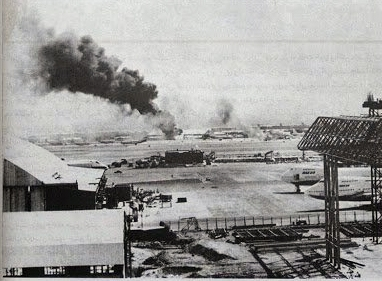
- Explosion in Mehrabad Air Base in Tehran after Iraqi forces attacked Tehran on September 22, 1980
- Type: Preemptive strike
- Location: Islamic Republic of Iran
- Planned by: Ba'athist Iraq
- Target: Iranian Air Force
- Date: 22 September 1980
- Executed by: Iraqi Air Force
- Outcome: Iraqi operational success: Most of Iran's fuel storage facilities and several aircraft destroyed

On 22 September 1980, Iraq under Saddam Hussein launched surprise airstrikes on various military targets, airports, oil refineries, and ports in Iran to support its ground invasion, marking the beginning of the Iran–Iraq War. The Iraqi Air Force had successfully destroyed much of the Iranian Air Force infrastructure and most of Iran's fuel storage facilities, however the majority of Iranian aircraft survived the attacks. Iran condemned the Iraqi strikes and accused the United States of supporting the air assault.

== Background ==
In mid-May 1980, Iran sent AH-1 Cobra helicopters to the border to fight pro-Iraqi separatists. During the fighting, at least 4 Iranian helicopters were shot down. On 23 May, Iraqi Air Force aircraft, consisting of Su-20 fighter-bombers and Mi-24 helicopters, attacked Iranian border checkpoints. 25 June 1988 saw the first combat air loss of the conflict — Iranian fighter F-5E Tiger II, was shot down by Iraqi air defense fire, the pilot, Captain Bastani, was killed.

By September, aviation began to be used much more widely, and began to be lost in large quantities.On 8 September, the first Iraqi Air Force loss with supporting information occurred — ground attack aircraft Hunter was shot down by an Iranian fighter.

== Planning ==
Impressed by the success of the Israeli Operation Focus during the Six-Day War, Iraqi President Saddam Hussein ordered his generals to prepare a pre-emptive strike on the Iranian Air Force, despite the shortcomings of the Iraqi Air Force.

The Iraqi Air Force command, led by Lieutenant General Muhammad Jasim Hanash, selected 25 strategically important targets for airstrikes, including 10 airfields. In order to maintain secrecy, the operation was disguised as tactical aviation exercises.

== Operation ==
At noon, 192 Iraqi aircraft took off from various airbases across Iraq and headed east toward Iran. The first planes to reach their targets were Su-20s from Kirkuk Airbase. Bombing the Hamadan Airbase at 1:45 PM, these raids caused damages to the airbase runway. Within the next few minutes, other Iraqi aircraft reached airbases in Tabriz, Dezful, Bushehr, Kermanshah, Ahwaz, and Sanandaj, but they failed to cause significant damages to the Iranian airbases.

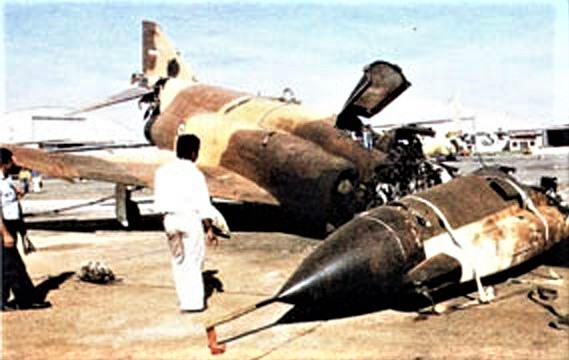
An Iranian Phantom destroyed by Iraqi forces following the airstrikes on Mehrabad Airport

At 2:20 PM, five Iraqi Tu-22 heavy bombers flew over the Iranian capital, Tehran, at very low altitude. They bombed the Mehrabad International Airport and the air force command's barracks, although the latter missed its target. At 2:30 PM, four Tu-16 heavy bombers reached the Isfahan airbase, housing half of the Iranian Grumman F-14 Tomcat fleet. The aircraft released their bombs but failed to destroy the runway. At 2:40 PM, the last four Tu-22s reached the Shiraz Airbase, housing the other half of the Iranian F-14s. The bombers targeted the runway and a fuel depot but failed to destroy any aircraft.

By the day's end, the results of 250 missions flown were slim, with only four enemy planes destroyed versus five planes lost. The Iranian Air Force emerged from this operation, designed to permanently ground it, unharmed. Most of the craters left by Iraqi bombs were filled during the night. By morning, the principal Iranian air bases were operational again.

Iranian pilot Captain H. Assefi reported that Iraqi airstrikes had successfully destroyed most of Iran's fuel storage facilities and managed to destroy several aircraft in the process. Consequently, Iran temporarily lost all telephone and satellite communications with the outside world.

== Reaction and counterstrikes ==
Iranian Foreign Minister Karim Khodapanahi publicly claimed that "the United States has started bombing Iranian cities." A few days later, Iran's Minister of Defense alleged that "there are Soviet tankers in Iraqi tanks," suggesting both superpowers were involved.

After the airstrikes ended, the Iranian Air Force prepared for retaliatory strikes. Despite their limited number of operational aircraft, a few Iranian jets managed to take off on the evening of 22 September. Iran lost another F-4E fighter during this mission, and both pilots, Captain M. Salehi and Lieutenant K. Heidari, were killed. Western sources reported that 28 Iraqi civilians were killed in the Iranian strike.

Later that day, Iranian radio broadcasts reported clashes between the Iranian military and Kurdish forces in the north. Foreign Minister Khodapanahi made another statement that Iraq, with U.S. support, had begun bombing Iran.

== See also ==
- Operation Revenge
- Operation Kaman 99
