= Muthenna Air Base =

Muthenna Air base FOB Headhunter Camp Independence

Site information
- Condition: Demolished

Location
- Coordinates: 33°19′36″N 044°22′05″E

Site history
- Built: 1933

Location of Muthenna Air Base, Iraq

Muthenna Air Base, formerly known as Baghdad West Aerodrome, is a former Iraqi Air Force base in the Baghdad Governorate of Iraq. It was captured by U.S.-led Coalition forces during Operation Iraqi Freedom in 2003.

== History ==
Baghdad West Aerodrome, which would later be known as Al-Muthanna Airport was made available for civilian flights of Imperial Airways on April 1, 1929. On 23 June, 1921, the Royal Air Force began the Cairo—Baghdad Desert Air Mail service at Baghdad West Aerodrome, which became Iraq's principal air terminal. However, the service was transferred to RAF Hinaidi. A decision was made to develop Baghdad West Aerodrome into the city's main civilian airport, and a terminal was constructed. On 5 April, 1933, the airport officially opened. Eventually, a concrete runway with a length of 3,000 meters was built to serve the airport. By the 1950s, Baghdad West Aerodrome was an important airport in the country. By June 1958, the airport was equipped with four runways. Two sand-packed runways orientated NW/SE measured 5950 x 150 and 6000 x 160, and the main runway, orientated NW/SE measured 7050 x 150. The main runway was built with macadam, and had a weight bearing load of 132,000 lbs. There was another macadam runway orientated NE/SW reported in poor condition measured 2700 x 150. There were four steel hangars, administrative offices, and workshops. The taxiways were 100% usable, while the aprons were only 25% usable. Because of this, aircraft were parked on the runways, which were also used as a taxiway.

In September 1970, Baghdad International Airport was opened, replacing Baghdad West Aerodrome. Following the replacement, the airport became an air base, and was later renamed Al-Muthenna Airport. Muthenna was an Iraqi military facility west of the center of Baghdad.

=== Muthenna Air Base ===
The base was one of several Iraqi Air Force airfields in the mid-1970s which were re-built under project "Super-Base" in response to the experiences from Arab–Israeli wars in 1967 and 1973. Between June 1980 through February 1983, Muthenna Air Base was developed to improve the deployment flexibility of the IQAF. It was also as part of a national drive to construct new airfields and renovate existing airfields. The existing runway was extended to 2,985 meters, and a new apron with two large hangars was built. By then, the former passenger terminal was converted into a VIP terminal.

It was a highly important airfield, with the headquarters of the Central (or 1st) Air Defence Sector located there. Muthenna was also the main base of the No 31 Transport Squadron IQAF, equipped with different transport aircraft flown by several detachments, and the "Special VIP-Squadron" IrAAC, that flew two VIP-configured Westland Commandos, three SA.330 Puma, and several MBB Bo.105 helicopters. It was the home base for Iraqi Air Force transport squadrons and navigation school.

During the 1980s a detachment of two Mi-25s of the 4th Sqn IrAAC, used for armed escort of the VIPs, was frequently based at Muthenna as well, and in 1991 a detachment of the No. 5 Sqn IrAF, equipped with MiG-29s, was based here.

Muthenna was among the airbases bombed during Operation Kaman 99, which was launched by Iranian air force the day after the Iraqi invasion of Iran and the beginning of the Iran–Iraq War of 1980s.

During the 1991 Gulf War, three of Baghdad's 42 targets—Iraqi air force headquarters, Muthenna airfield, and Ba'ath party headquarters—absorbed 20 percent of the effort. The Ba'ath party headquarters were hit with 28 bombs, Iraqi air force headquarters with 17, and Muthenna airfield with 25. The damage at Muthenna was so extensive that it was subsequently abandoned as a functioning aviation facility.

After the 2003 invasion of Iraq, the site was used as a forward operating base by the United States Army.

A large mosque was being built in the area, but never finished construction. The airport was demolished in sake of the development.
