= Shafi, Iraq =

Town in Iraq

Al-Basrah in Iraq.

Shafi (الشافي ) is a town of Basrah Governorate in southern Iraq, on the west bank of the Shatt Al-Arab River.

Shafi is located at 34°18'45" north and 44°17'17" east. The area is close to the Mesopotamian Marshes (Hammar Marshes), and has traditionally been home to many Marsh Arabs. The topography is flat and the climate arid.

The area suffered greatly during the Iran–Iraq War, during which it was a major battlefield, and again after the 1991 Iraqi uprising.
