= Iraq–Pakistan relations =

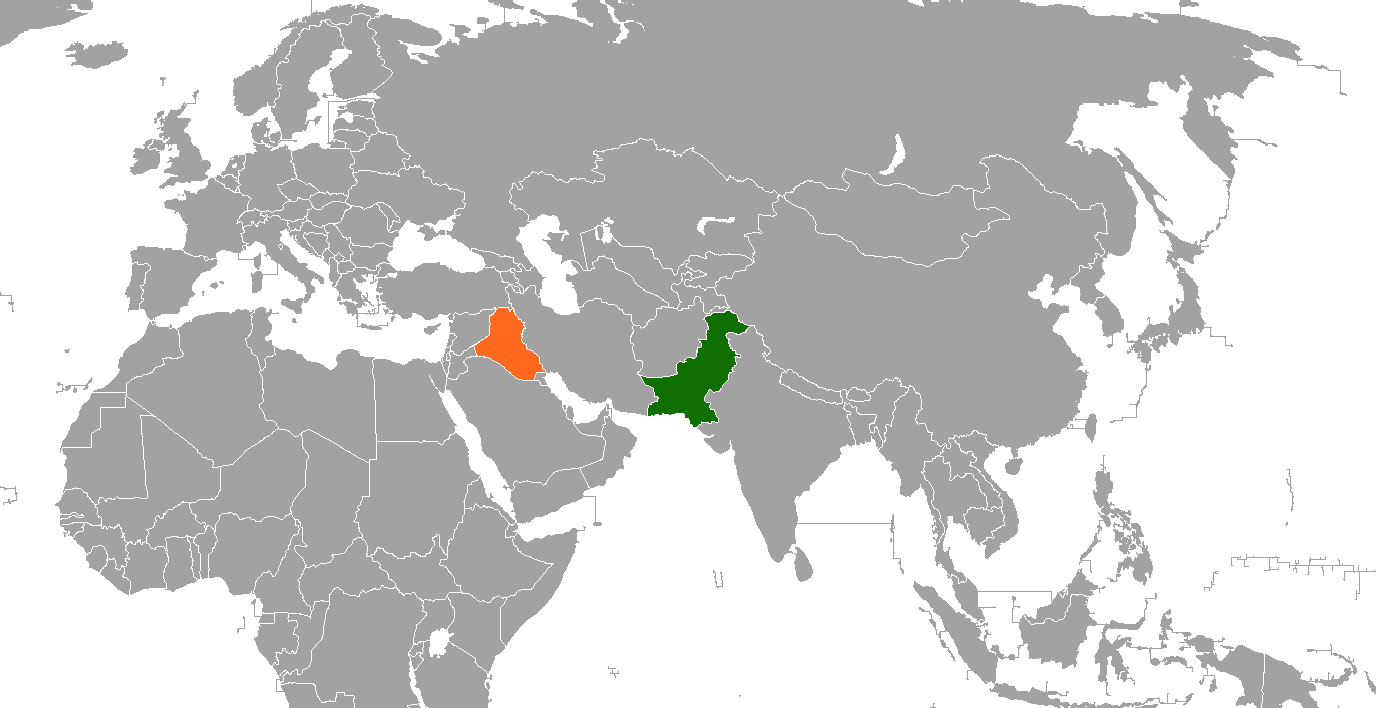
- Pakistan: Iraq

Iraq and Pakistan established diplomatic relations in 1947. Cultural interaction and economic trade between Mesopotamia and the Indus Valley date back to 1800 BCE. In 1955, both Iraq and Pakistan joined the Baghdad Pact, a military alliance against the Soviet Union. However, when the king of Iraq was assassinated in 1958, Iraq pulled out of the Baghdad Pact, which was subsequently renamed to the Central Treaty Organization (CENTO). During the Ba'athist era, relations were at times cordial and sometimes hostile. However, following the 2003 invasion of Iraq that toppled the Ba'athist government, bilateral relations have stabilized; Pakistan has supported Iraq in its fight against the Islamic State and other militant groups active in the Iraqi conflict. Iraq maintains an embassy in Islamabad while Pakistan maintains an embassy in Baghdad.

== History ==
=== Zutt Rebellion ===
Regions from Makran and Turan to Mansura were the original homeland of the Zutt people.

The Zutt Rebellion was an uprising by the Zutt tribe, who were originally from the Indus Valley region in modern-day Pakistan. The tribe, part of the Jat group, had migrated to the region of Mesopotamia (modern-day Iraq) centuries before the rebellion. Over time, the Zutt became mercenaries for the Umayyad and Abbasid Caliphates, settling in southern Iraq and forming the Banu Zutt or Az-Zutt tribe.

The rebellion began around 810, when Yusuf ibn Zutt, a leader of the tribe, challenged the Abbasid Caliphate and established semi-independent control over the marshlands of southern Iraq, including important areas like Kufa and Basra. The rebellion disrupted resource supplies to Baghdad, putting the Abbasid Caliphate in jeopardy. For years, the Zutt were successful in their raids, causing heavy damage to Abbasid forces and leaders. Their actions contributed heavily to the weakening of the Abbasid Empire, with their guerrilla tactics and raids advancing deep into Abbasid territory, further destabilizing the region.

== History of foreign relations ==
=== Central Treaty Organization ===
Pakistan and Iraq joined the Central Treaty Organization (CENTO) in 1955 to oppose the Soviet Union; however, Iraq withdrew in 1959, following the 14 July Revolution.

=== Diplomatic rift and tensions ===
Relations between the two countries deteriorated during the 1970s, beginning with the 1971 Organization of Islamic Conference summit in Lahore. Iraq was the second country and first Arab country to recognise Bangladesh as a sovereign nation after East Germany in 1972. Iraq's then-President Hassan al-Bakr financially and militarily supported the Balochistan Liberation Army during the internal rebellion in Balochistan. The support continued till 1973 when the Military Intelligence of Pakistan convinced Akbar Bugti to join Zulfiqar Ali Bhutto's government as a governor of the province, who was a Baloch leader, to defect to Pakistan.

On 10 February 1973, the Punjab Rangers and the Islamabad Police raided the Iraqi embassy in Islamabad without warning the Iraqi government. This tactical operation revealed a large cache of arms, ammunition, and hand grenades. Other weapon supplies were found in crates marked "Foreign Ministry, Baghdad" and these were allegedly for the Pakistani Baloch rebels. Pakistan expelled and declared persona non grata for Iraqi Ambassador Hikmat Sulaiman and other consular staff.

In a letter written to President Richard Nixon on 14 February 1973, Pakistan's Prime Minister Zulfikar Ali Bhutto blamed India, Afghanistan, Iraq and the Soviet Union, for involvement in a "conspiracy ... [with] subversive and irredentist elements which seek to disrupt Pakistan's integrity."

A successful military operation led to dismantling of Baloch rebels in the province. In the 1980s, the Martial Law Administrator of Balochistan, General Rahimuddin Khan, enacted policies that stabilized the province. In the wake of the Iran–Iraq War, the Gulf Cooperation Council was formed in 1981 in the Middle East. During the war, President Saddam Hussein unsuccessfully tried to work with the Baloch rebels to divert Iran's focus to Pakistan. Most of the military instructors were from the Pakistan Armed Forces. Around 40,000 military personnel of Pakistan Armed Forces were stationed in Saudi Arabia to reinforce the internal and external security of the country.

The Iran-Iraq war was a polarizing issue in Pakistan, with half of its population now under threat from its own Shiite population and from Iran. President Zia increased Pakistan's security, knowing that since the country was close to the United States, it might get pulled into a war. The high-ranking members of Pakistan Armed Forces objected to the killing of Shiite pilgrims in Saudi Arabia. Zia did not issue any orders to Pakistan Armed Forces-Arab Contingent Forces, to engage any country militarily.

The Iran–Iraq war provided Zia with an opportunity to contend with Iran. Many stinger missiles shipped for Afghan Mujahideen were sold to Iran, which was a defining factor for the country in the Tanker War.

=== Gulf War and sanctions ===
In 1990, Iraq invaded Kuwait due to the increasing political tensions between the two Arab nations. Pakistan endorsed the United States-led military campaign against Iraq, with Chief of Army staff, General Aslam Beg and Chairman Joint Chiefs Admiral Iftikhar Sirohey overseeing the deployment of the Pakistan Armed Forces Middle East Contingent forces.

General Beg accused Western countries of encouraging Iraq to invade Kuwait, though he continued to lead his armed forces against Iraq in support of Saudi Arabia. As Iraq's war with Kuwait divided Pakistanis, Beg carefully commanded and deployed the Pakistan Armed Forces' contingent forces during the Operation Desert Storm.

After the 1991 Gulf War, Iraq began building closer relations with India. In 2000, then-Iraqi Vice-president Taha Yassin Ramadan visited India, and on 6 August 2002, President Saddam Hussein conveyed Iraq's "unwavering support" to India over the Kashmir dispute with Pakistan. India and Iraq established joint ministerial committees and trade delegations to promote extensive bilateral co-operation.

==== Post-Ba'athist era ====
In 2003, before the outbreak of the Iraq War, Pakistan announced that it was opposed to any military action against Iraq. Pakistan was under public pressure to vote against the war, although some had considered voting for the war. However, after the war ended, Pakistan indicated that it was willing to send its Middle East military contingent forces to Iraq for peacekeeping if they required it.

The United States and the United Kingdom made many calls for the deployment of the Pakistan military's contingent forces for peacekeeping operations in Iraq. However, the Pakistan military officials said "given the uprising against the US-led coalition forces in Iraq and the internal anarchy there, sending our troops at this time would be like jumping into fire." Tensions between the two countries remained intense over the issue of foreign hostages in Iraq. During 2004–05, 14 Pakistani citizens were made hostages out of which two were killed. However, the relations were normalized following the United States troops troop withdrawal from Iraq. In 2013, both countries signed a defence pact.

Iraq's ambassador to Pakistan Dr. Rushdi Al-Ani claimed that Iraq considers Pakistan "a Muslim super power" and that Iraq was willing to supply Pakistan with oil unconditionally. In 2014 Iraq purchased the Super Mushak trainer aircraft from Pakistan as part of improving defense relations between the two countries.

=== War in Iraq (2013–2017) ===
The War in Iraq (2013–2017), also known as the Third Iraq War, was an armed conflict between Iraq and its allies and the Islamic State from 2013 to 2017. Neither Iraqis nor Pakistani officials have previously acknowledged Pakistan's role in the fight against the Islamic State of Iraq. During a news conference held at the embassy, Iraqi Ambassador Ali Yasin Muhammad Karim stated that Pakistan was one of several nations that backed Iraq in its war against the Islamic State of Iraq and Syria (IS). The purpose of the press conference was to inform Pakistani media of the IS's evacuation from Mosul.

Speaking about Pakistan's cooperation, the ambassador stated that in addition to receiving intelligence on terrorists, Iraq also benefited from military medical care, weapons, and ammunition supplied by Pakistan. He mentioned that Pakistan had served as a training ground for a number of the Iraqi pilots that flew against the Islamic State.

According to the ambassador, Pakistan and Iraq might deal with the growing presence of the Islamic State of Iraq and Syria (IS) in the region if they continue their intelligence collaboration. He also commended Pakistan for maintaining its neutral stance in the Middle East.

=== Recent visits ===
The state visits at ministerial levels by both countries have resulted in the improvement of relations between the two countries. Bilawal Bhutto, the foreign minister of Pakistan, visited Baghdad on a three-day visit to sign the Memorandum of Understanding among the Pakistani and Iraqi chambers of federation. During the visit, meetings were held by the foreign minister with the Iraqi leadership laid the foundation stone of Pakistan’s own embassy which was building in Iraq, according to the Pakistani foreign office. Both countries also signed agreements to end the diplomatic visas between both countries on diplomatic level.

Pakistan's foreign minister stated Iraq ‘a true friend’ of Pakistan, he expressed the hope to reinvigorate fraternal ties and transform them into exemplary beneficial economic relations. Pakistan's Foreign Minister met with Iraq's President to strengthen ties between the two countries. They pledged to cooperate more in areas like water management, agriculture, defense, and trade.

== Resident diplomatic missions ==
- Iraq has an embassy in Islamabad and a consulate-general in Karachi.
- Pakistan has an embassy in Baghdad.

== See also ==
- Indus-Mesopotamia relations
- 1973 raid on the Iraqi embassy in Pakistan
- Iran–Pakistan relations
