= 1975 Algiers Agreement =

Algeria-mediated treaty between Iran and Iraq

Coordinates: 29°51′54″N 48°45′07″E

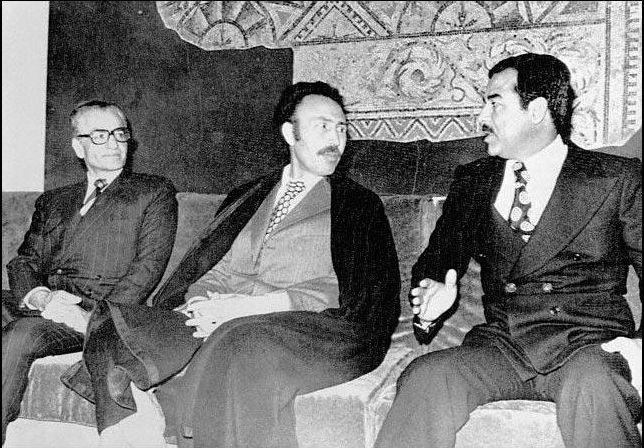
- Left-to-right: Iranian monarch Mohammad Reza Pahlavi; Algerian president Houari Boumédiène; Iraqi vice president Saddam Hussein
- Signed: 6 March 1975; 51 years ago
- Location: Algiers, Algeria
- Mediators: Algeria
- Signatories: Mohammad Reza Pahlavi; Saddam Hussein
- Parties: Iran; Iraq
- Languages: Arabic and Persian

The 1975 Algiers Agreement, also known as the Algiers Accords and the Algiers Declaration, was signed between Iran and Iraq to settle any outstanding territorial disputes along the Iran–Iraq border. Mediated by Algeria, it served as the basis for additional bilateral treaties signed on 13 June 1975 and 26 December 1975. The territorial disputes in question concerned Iraq's Shatt al-Arab and Iran's Khuzestan Province, and Iraq had wished to negotiate to end Iran's support for the then-ongoing Iraqi Kurdish rebellion after suffering a military defeat in the 1974–1975 Shatt al-Arab conflict. On 17 September 1980, shortly after the Iranian Revolution, the Iraqi government abrogated the treaty in light of another series of cross-border clashes between the two countries. On 22 September 1980, the treaty was completely voided with the Iraqi invasion of Iran, which triggered the eight-year-long Iran–Iraq War.

Since the 2003 invasion of Iraq, the detailed boundary delimitation of the treaty has remained de jure in force and binding under international law (per UNSC Resolution 619), though there is occasional friction between the two countries over the state of their border in the context of smuggling and the Iraqi conflict.

== Background ==
=== Iraqi–Kurdish conflict ===
In 1963, after the Ramadan Revolution, the Ba'ath Party government led by Ahmad Hassan al-Bakr, launched a campaign against the Kurdish rebellion, that had been seeking independence from Iraq. The Ba'ath led government collapsed after the November 1963 coup led by Abdul Salam Arif. Relations between the new government and the Kurds had not been agreed. In 1968, another revolution occurred with the Ba'ath Party and the Iraqi government, called the 17 July Revolution. Tensions between the new government and the Kurds increased, with the Iraqi Armed Forces engaging in military action against Kurdish separatists. The actions of Kurdish rebels caused massive economic disruption. On 11 March 1970, a treaty was signed between the Vice-Chairman of the Revolutionary Command Council (Iraq), Saddam Hussein, called the "March Manifesto" and the leader of the Kurdish rebellion, Mustafa al-Barzani, in Tikrit, to end the conflict. Under the agreement, militias were to be merged into the Iraqi Army, cut all ties with Iran and the rebellion would come to an end. In return, the Iraqi government promised the Kurds autonomy, with Kurdish representatives to be included in the Iraqi government. The government had previously encouraged the "Arabization" of the oil-rich Kurdish regions. By 1974, there remained unresolved problems between the government and the Kurds about the oil resources of the Kurdish regions of Iraq. Kurdish ministers resigned from the government, Kurdish employees withdrew, and Kurdish police and soldiers no longer cooperated with the government. The Iraqi government insisted that the Kurds were bound by the agreement, but the Kurds believed that it was the government who had breached the accord. On 11 March 1974, the agreement was incorporated into the Iraqi constitution. Fighting again broke out between the Iraqi army and Kurdish forces, with Iran supporting the Kurds.

=== Iran–Iraq border disputes ===
With the Ba'ath Party in control of the government, in 1968, Iraq demanded full control over the Shatt al-Arab (Arvand Rud). On 19 April 1969, Iran withdrew from the 1937 agreement, which had been signed between Iraq and Iran to resolve border problems, arguing that Iraq interfered with Iranian boats in the Shatt al-Arab. In April 1969, both armies were deployed on the banks of the Persian Gulf. After Iran took control of four islands in the Persian Gulf, diplomatic relations between Baghdad and Tehran deteriorated markedly. Iraq encouraged the Arabs of Khuzestan to rebel against the Shah of Iran Mohammad Reza Pahlavi. Iraq also expelled all Iranians from Iraq. Iran supported the Kurds in the Iraqi–Kurdish War with military equipment and funding. Mustafa al-Barzani met with representatives from the American government to support the Kurds secretly, further weakening the Iraqi position which was further complicated by the outbreak of the Yom Kippur War. Iraq now needed to appease Iran, fearing that Iran might attack them from the east, while most of the Iraqi Armed Forces were fighting on the Syrian Front.

== Negotiations ==
In 1973, Iraq began negotiations with Iran, hoping that it would end Iranian support for the Kurdish rebellion. In late April, a meeting was held in Geneva between the countries' foreign ministers. Iraqi representatives demanded that the 1937 treaty be adhered to, which gives most of the Shatt al-Arab to Iraq, but Iranian representatives refused. Discussions failed, but meetings continued to be held between the two countries. Mohammad Reza Pahlavi was completely inflexible, and sought control over half of the Shatt al-Arab (Arvand Rud). After the Shatt al-Arab discussions were completed, Iraq also sought the end to Iranian support of the Kurds.

In May 1974, Iraq and Iran started the process of marking the Shatt al-Arab (Arvand Rud) boundary between them. In the 1974 Arab League summit, representatives from Iran's government attended to talk with Iraqi representatives with the mediation of King Hussein of Jordan. Talks continued between the two countries sporadically, Iraq was reluctant to abandon territory which had been assigned to it in the 1937 treaty. Iran increased its support of the Kurds, which substantially increased problems for the Iraqi military. Saddam Hussein and Mohammad Reza Pahlavi attended the OPEC summit on 6 March 1975 in Algiers, where an agreement was made and signed with the mediation of Houari Boumédiène, the then Chairman of the Revolutionary Council of Algeria.

Iraq reluctantly conceded the territory to Iran because of the need to end the Kurdish War and to end the violence near the Shatt al-Arab with Iran. The border between the two nations was adjusted in Iran's favor.

== Agreements ==
=== Algerian mediation ===
The Algiers Agreement placed the border between Iraq and Iran in the center of the main channel of the Shatt al-Arab (Arvand Rud) waterway, usually called the thalweg. Iraq was required to abandon its claim to Arab areas in Western Iran. The two countries were required to commit themselves to maintain close and effective supervision over their common boundary and to end any intervention in the other's territory. Iran was therefore required to end any support for the Kurds. Both countries agreed to being good neighbors. A violation of one part of the agreement "contradicts the spirit of Algiers Agreement."

On 15 March 1975, the Iraqi and Iranian foreign ministers met with the Algerian representatives to establish a joint committee to mark the new border. On 17 March, the protocol between the two countries was signed by the two foreign ministers. The protocol states that the two countries undertake to re-mark the border.

On 13 June 1975, another treaty was signed in Baghdad by Iraq's and Iran's foreign ministers. It added detail to agreements about conflict resolution and the determination of the border and any changes. The treaty is called the "Iran-Iraq: Treaty on International Borders and Good Neighborly Relations".

== Results ==
The Iran–Iraq commission formally delineated the two countries' border on 26 December 1975, with the signing of a joint declaration of intents by both sides. The Iranian military withdrew from border areas that it was occupying, the border was closed, and support for the Kurdish rebels ended. Iran also directed the CIA and the Mossad to end their military support for the Kurds. It was thought that with the end of international support, the Iraqi government would negotiate with the Kurds, but Saddam Hussein launched a major military campaign against the rebels, prompting Iranian monarch Mohammad Reza Pahlavi to intervene. A ceasefire was agreed upon by all sides, but on 1 April, the Iraqi government launched another military campaign. After a number of battles, the Iraqi military declared victory, but more than 100,000 Kurdish refugees fled to Iran and Turkey, including Kurdish leader Mustafa Barzani, only to return and start another rebellion in 1978.

== Aftermath ==
Iraq withdrew from the Algiers Agreement on 17 September 1980. The agreement had been imposed on the country and the chaos in Iran after the Iranian Revolution led to the belief in Iraq that the changes could be undone. This resulted in one of the longest wars of the 20th century, the Iran–Iraq War, which would last from 1980 to 1988. The war was ended in accordance with United Nations Security Council Resolution 619 and returned both parties to the Algiers Agreement of 1975.

== See also ==
- Iran–Iraq War (1980–1988)
