= Iraqi invasion of Iran =

Event that sparked the Iran–Iraq War in 1980

- Part of the Iran–Iraq War
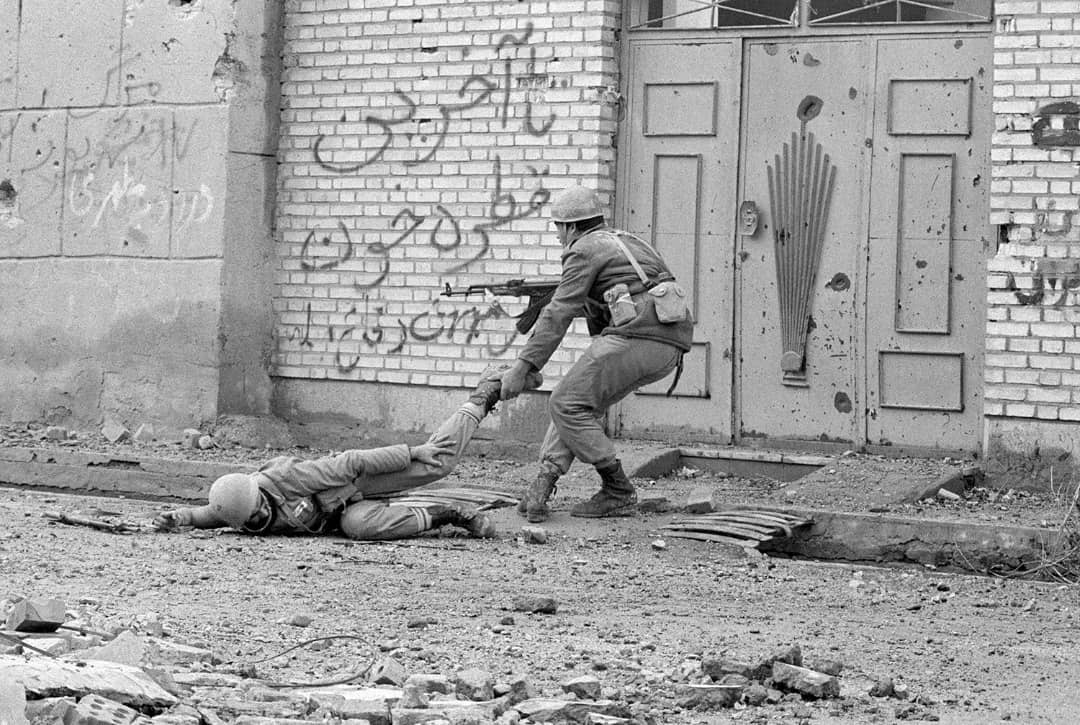
- An Iranian soldier rescuing a wounded soldier in the First Battle of Khorramshahr (September–November 1980). The Persian graffiti on the wall reads as "[We] will defend the motherland until the last drop of [our] blood".
| Date | 22 September 1980 – 5 December 1980 (2 months, 1 week and 6 days) |
| Location | Western Iran |
| Result | Iraqi victory |
| Territorial changes | Iraq seizes over 25,900 km^{2} (10,000 sq mi) of Iranian territory by 5 December |

Belligerents
| Iran | Iraq; DRFLA |

Commanders and leaders
| Ruhollah Khomeini (Supreme Leader of Iran); Abolhassan Banisadr (1st President of Iran and Commander-in-Chief); Mostafa Chamran (Minister of Defence); Valiollah Fallahi (Joint chief of military staff); Qasem-Ali Zahirnejad (Joint chief of military staff); Mohsen Rezaee (Revolutionary Guards Commander) | (Ba'athist Iraq) Saddam Hussein (President of Iraq) (Ba'athist Iraq) Ali Hassan al-Majid (General and Iraqi Intelligence Service head) (Ba'athist Iraq) Taha Yassin Ramadan (General and Deputy Party Secretary) (Ba'athist Iraq) Adnan Khairallah (Minister of Defence) (Ba'athist Iraq) Saddam Kamel (Republican Guard Commander) |

Units involved
| Iranian Armed Forces: Army; Ground Force; Air Force; Navy; Air Defence; Army Aviation; Revolutionary Guards (Pasdaran); Gendarmerie; Shahrbani; Basij; Irregular Warfare Headquarters | (Ba'athist Iraq) Iraqi Armed Forces: Army; Navy; Air Force; Republican Guard; Popular Army; National Defense Battalions |

Strength
| At the onset of the war: 110,000–150,000 soldiers 1,700–2,100 tanks(500 operable); 1,000 armoured vehicles 300 operable artillery pieces 485 fighter-bombers (205 fully operational); 750 helicopters | At the onset of the war: 200,000 soldiers 2,800 tanks 4,000 APCs; 1,400 artillery pieces 380 fighter-bombers 350 helicopters |

Casualties and losses
| 4,500 killed 12,000 wounded Equipment: 250 tanks 150 armored vehicles 60 helicopters (Note: 32 Cobras 27 AB-205/212s 1 CH-47) 30 fighter-bombers (Note: 18 F-4 Phantoms 12 F-5 Tigers) | 4,000 killed 10,000 wounded Equipment: 450 tanks 350 armored vehicles 80 fighter-bombers (Note: 31 MiG-21 20 MiG-23s 9 Su-22s 3 Su-7s 3 Tu-22s 2 Hunters 1 Tu-16) 40 helicopters (Note: 17 Gazelles 10 Mi-24s 8 Mi-8s 2 Mi-4s 2 Alouette IIIs 1 Super Frelon) |

The Iraqi invasion of Iran began on 22 September 1980, sparking the Iran–Iraq War, and lasted until 5 December 1980. Ba'athist Iraq believed that Iran would not respond effectively due to internal socio-political turmoil caused by the country's Islamic Revolution one year earlier. However, Iraqi troops faced fierce Iranian resistance, which stalled their advance into western Iran. In two months, the invasion came to a halt after Iraq occupied more than 25,900 square kilometres (10,000 sq mi) of Iranian territory.

On 10 September 1980, Iraq, hoping to take advantage of a weakened Iran's consolidation of the Islamic Revolution, forcibly reclaimed territories in Zain al-Qaws and Saïf Saad; these had been promised to Iraq under the terms of the 1975 Algiers Agreement, but were never actually transferred. Both Iran and Iraq later declared the treaty as null and void, doing so on 14 September and 17 September, respectively. As a result, the only outstanding dispute along the Iran–Iraq border at the time of the Iraqi invasion on 22 September was the question of whether Iranian ships would fly Iraqi flags and pay navigation fees to Iraq while sailing through a stretch of the Shatt al-Arab (Note: Known in Iran as the Arvand Rud (Persian: اروندرود, transl. 'Swift River') and in Iraq as the Shatt al-Arab (Arabic: شط العرب, transl. 'River of the Arabs').) spanning several kilometres. On 22 September, Iraqi aircraft pre-emptively bombarded ten Iranian airfields in an ultimately unsuccessful attempt to gain aerial superiority on the battlefield. On the next day, Iraqi troops crossed the international border in strength and advanced into Iran in three simultaneous thrusts along a front of approximately 644 kilometres (400 mi). Of Iraq's six divisions that were invading by land, four were sent to Iran's oil-rich Khuzestan in order to cut off Iranian access to the Shatt al-Arab and establish a territorial security zone.

Iraqi president Saddam Hussein presented the invasion as a strategically defensive measure to blunt the edge of Iranian politician Ruhollah Khomeini, who had risen to power as Iran's "supreme leader" and was attempting to export the Islamic Revolution to the Arab world. Saddam, as a secularist and an Arab nationalist, perceived Iran's Shia Islamism as an immediate and existential threat to his Ba'ath Party and thereby to Iraqi society as a whole. The Iraqi government sought to take control of the entire Shatt al-Arab in a rapid and decisive military campaign, believing that Iraq's victory in the broader conflict would humiliate Iran and lead to Khomeini's downfall, or, at the very least, thwart the new Iranian government's attempts to spread Khomeinism throughout the Muslim world. Saddam had also aspired to annex Khuzestan and saw the Islamic Revolution as an opportunity to do so, seeking to increase his country's prestige and power in the Arab world. To this end, his administration hoped that Iraq, as an Arab-majority country, could successfully exploit Arab separatism in Khuzestan to undermine Iran from within. In practice, these objectives failed to materialize and the majority of Iranian Arabs were indifferent to the pan-Arabism espoused by Iraq's Ba'athists.

== Background ==
=== Territorial disputes ===
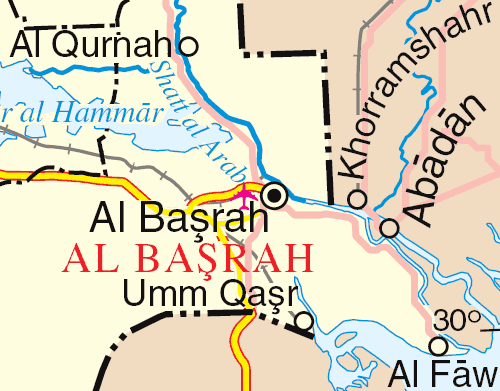
The Shatt al-Arab, a key river along the Iran–Iraq border

Saddam's primary interest in war may have stemmed from his desire to right the supposed "wrong" of the Algiers Agreement, in addition to finally achieving his desire of annexing Khuzestan and becoming the regional superpower. Saddam's goal was to replace Egypt as the "leader of the Arab world" and to achieve hegemony over the Persian Gulf. He saw Iran's increased weakness due to revolution, sanctions, and international isolation. Saddam had invested heavily in Iraq's military, buying large amounts of weaponry from the Soviet Union and France. Between 1973 and 1980 alone, Iraq purchased an estimated 1,600 tanks and APCs and over 200 Soviet-made aircraft. By 1980, Iraq possessed 242,000 soldiers (second only to Egypt in the Arab world), 2,350 tanks and 340 combat aircraft. Watching the powerful Iranian army that frustrated him in 1974–1975 disintegrate, he saw an opportunity to attack, using the threat of Islamic Revolution as a pretext.

=== Oil and Iran's Islamic Revolution ===
A successful invasion of Iran would enlarge Iraq's petroleum reserves and make Iraq the region's dominant power. With Iran engulfed in chaos, an opportunity for Iraq to annex the oil-rich Khuzestan Province materialized. In addition, Khuzestan's large ethnic Arab population would allow Saddam to pose as a liberator for Arabs from Persian rule. Fellow Gulf states such as Saudi Arabia and Kuwait (despite being hostile to Iraq) encouraged Iraq to attack, as they feared that an Islamic revolution would take place within their own borders. Certain Iranian exiles also helped convince Saddam that if he invaded, the fledgling Islamic republic would quickly collapse. In particular, Saddam was assured of Saudi support for an invasion of Iran during his August 1980 visit to Saudi Arabia.

== Prelude ==
=== Ideological sabre-rattling ===
In 1979–1980, Iraq was the beneficiary of an oil boom that saw it take in US$33 billion, which allowed the government to invest heavily in both civilian and military projects. On several occasions, Saddam alluded to the Muslim conquest of Persia while promoting his country's position against Iran in the context of a looming war. On 2 April 1980, during a visit to al-Mustansiriya University in the city of Baghdad, he drew parallels to the 7th-century Battle of al-Qadisiyyah, in which the Rashidun Caliphate secured a decisive victory over the Sasanian Empire:

In your name, brothers, and on behalf of the Iraqis and Arabs everywhere, we tell those Persian cowards and dwarfs who try to avenge al-Qadisiyah that the spirit of al-Qadisiyah as well as the blood and honor of the people of al-Qadisiyah who carried the message on their spearheads are greater than their attempts.

=== Revolts by Iraq's Shia Muslims ===
In 1979–1980, anti-Ba'ath riots arose in Iraq's Shia areas by groups who were working toward an Islamic revolution in their country. Saddam and his deputies believed that the riots had been inspired by the Iranian Revolution and instigated by Iran's government. On 10 March 1980, when Iraq declared Iran's ambassador persona non-grata, and demanded his withdrawal from Iraq by 15 March, Iran replied by downgrading its diplomatic ties to the charge d'affaires level, and demanded that Iraq withdraw their ambassador from Iran.

In April 1980, in response to the Ba'ath Party declaring membership in the Islamic Dawa Party a capital offense at the end of March, Shia militants assassinated 20 Ba'ath officials, and Deputy Prime Minister Tariq Aziz was almost assassinated on 1 April; Aziz survived, but 11 students were killed in the attack. Three days later, the funeral procession being held to bury the students was bombed. Iraqi Information Minister Latif Nusseif al-Jasim also barely survived assassination by Shia militants. In April 1980, Grand Ayatollah Muhammad Baqir al-Sadr and his sister Amina al-Sadr were executed as part of a crackdown to restore Saddam's control. The execution of Iraq's most senior Ayatollah, and "reports that Saddam's secret police had raped al-Sadr's sister in al-Sadr's presence, had set his beard alight, and then dispatched him with a nail gun" caused outrage throughout the Islamic world, especially among Iraqi Shias. The Shias' repeated calls for the overthrow of the Ba'ath party and the support they allegedly received from Iran's new government led Saddam to increasingly perceive Iran as a threat that, if ignored, might one day overthrow him; he thus used the attacks as pretext for attacking Iran that September, though skirmishes along the Iran–Iraq border had already become a daily event by May that year.

Iraq soon after expropriated the properties of 70,000 civilians believed to be of Iranian origin and expelled them from its territory. Many, if not most, of those expelled were in fact Arabic-speaking Iraqi Shias who had little to no family ties with Iran. This caused tensions between the two nations to increase further.

Iraq also helped to instigate riots among Iranian Arabs in Khuzestan province, supporting them in their labor disputes, and turning uprisings into armed battles between Iran's Revolutionary Guards and militants, killing over 100 on both sides. At times, Iraq also supported armed rebellion by the Kurdish Democratic Party of Iran in Kurdistan. The most notable of such events was the Iranian Embassy siege in London, in which six armed Khuzestani Arab insurgents took the Iranian Embassy's staff as hostages, resulting in an armed siege that was finally ended by Britain's Special Air Service. A 2014 academic source confirms that the embassy attackers were "recruited and trained" by the Iraqi government.

=== Planning ===
Iraqi military planning for the invasion suffered serious deficiencies. There was no effective planning staff or high command. Army and air force operations were largely planned in isolation. Compounding this issue, the Iraqis lacked an effective intelligence system and consequently they greatly underestimated the Iranians capacity to organize resistance. The quality of reconnaissance efforts was also poor. The Iraqis planned for a short war and had no real contingency created incase the conflict became prolonged.

Despite Iran's bellicose rhetoric, Iraqi military intelligence reported in July 1980 that "it is clear that, at present, Iran has no power to launch wide offensive operations against Iraq, or to defend on a large scale." Days before the Iraqi invasion and in the midst of rapidly escalating cross-border skirmishes, Iraqi military intelligence again reiterated on 14 September that "the enemy deployment organization does not indicate hostile intentions and appears to be taking on a more defensive mode."

According to former Iraqi general Ra'ad al-Hamdani, the Iraqis believed that in addition to the Arab revolts, the Revolutionary Guards would be drawn out of Tehran, leading to a counter-revolution in Iran that would cause Khomeini's government to collapse and thus ensure Iraqi victory. However, rather than turning against the revolutionary government as experts had predicted, Iran's people (including Iranian Arabs) rallied in support of the country and put up a stiff resistance.

=== Escalation of border skirmishes ===
By September, skirmishes between Iran and Iraq were increasing in number. Iraq began to grow bolder, both shelling and launching border incursions into disputed territories. Malovany describes the Iraqi Army's seizure of the Zayn al-Qaws enclave, near Khanaqin (by 6th Armoured Division, 2nd Corps); the Saif Sa'ad enclave (10th Armoured Division) and the Maysan enclave between Shib and Fakkeh (1st Mechanised Division, 3rd Corps). Iran responded by shelling several Iraqi border towns and posts, though this did little to alter the situation on the ground. By 10 September, Saddam declared that the Iraqi Army had "liberated" all disputed territories within Iran. It should be carefully noted that Malovany, an Israeli ex-intelligence analyst writing years later, said the enclaves were not completely seized until 21 September.

With the conclusion of the "liberating operations", on 17 September, in a statement addressed to Iraq's parliament, Saddam stated:

The frequent and blatant Iranian violations of Iraqi sovereignty...have rendered the 1975 Algiers Agreement null and void... This river [Shatt al-Arab]...must have its Iraqi-Arab identity restored as it was throughout history in name and in reality with all the disposal rights emanating from full sovereignty over the river...We in no way wish to launch war against Iran.

Despite Saddam's claim that Iraq did not want war with Iran, the next day his forces proceeded to attack Iranian border posts in preparation for the planned invasion. Iraq's 7th Mechanised and 4th Infantry Divisions attacked the Iranian border posts leading to the cities of Fakkeh and Bostan, opening the route for future armoured thrusts into Iran. Weakened by internal chaos, Iran was unable to repel the attacks; which in turn led to Iraq becoming more confident in its military edge over Iran and prompting them to believe in a quick victory.

== Iraqi operations ==
=== Pre-emptive airstrikes ===
Iraq launched a full-scale invasion of Iran on 22 September 1980. The Iraqi Air Force launched surprise air strikes on ten Iranian airfields with the objective of destroying the Iranian Air Force, mimicking the Israeli Air Force in the Six-Day War. The attack failed to damage Iranian Air Force significantly: it damaged some of Iran's airbase infrastructure, but failed to destroy a significant number of aircraft: the Iraqi Air Force was only able to strike in depth with a few MiG-23BN, Tu-22, and Su-20 aircraft. Three MiG-23s managed to attack Tehran, striking its airport, but destroyed only a few aircraft.

=== Ground invasion ===
The next day, Iraq launched a ground invasion along a front measuring 644 km (400 mi) in three simultaneous attacks.

Of Iraq's six divisions that were invading by ground, four were sent to Khuzestan, which was located near the border's southern end, to cut off the Shatt al-Arab from the rest of Iran and to establish a territorial security zone. The other two divisions invaded across the northern and central part of the border to prevent an Iranian counter-attack.

==== Northern front ====
On the northern front, the Iraqis attempted to establish a strong defensive position opposite Sulaymaniyah to protect the Iraqi Kirkuk oil complex.

==== Central front ====
On the central front, the Iraqis occupied Mehran, advanced towards the foothills of the Zagros Mountains, and were able to block the traditional Tehran–Baghdad invasion route by securing territory forward of Qasr-e Shirin, Iran.

==== Southern front ====
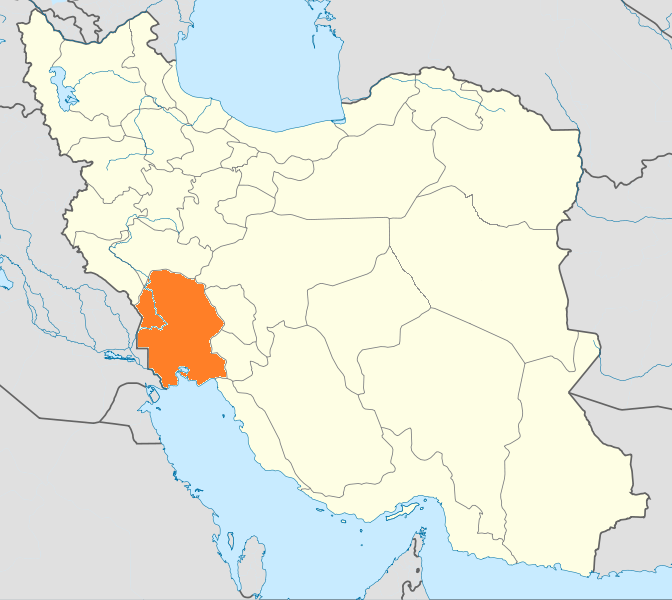
Location of Khuzestan Province (orange) within Iran

Two of the four Iraqi divisions which invaded Khuzestan, one mechanised and one armoured, operated near the southern end and began a siege of the strategically important port cities of Abadan and Khorramshahr. The other two divisions, both armoured, secured the territory bounded by the cities of Khorramshahr, Ahvaz, Susangerd, and Musian. The armoured division made significant use of Russian armor, including T-62s.

Iraqi hopes of an uprising by the ethnic Arabs of Khuzestan failed to materialise, as most of the ethnic Arabs remained loyal to Iran. The Iraqi troops advancing into Iran in 1980 were described by Patrick Brogan as "badly led and lacking in offensive spirit". The first known chemical weapons attack by Iraq on Iran probably took place during the fighting around Susangerd.

===== Battle of Khorramshahr =====
On 22 September, a prolonged battle began in the city of Khorramshahr, eventually leaving 7,000 dead on each side. Reflecting the bloody nature of the struggle, Iranians came to call Khorramshahr "City of Blood" (خونین شهر, Khunin shahr).

The battle began with Iraqi air raids against key points and mechanised divisions advancing on the city in a crescent-like formation. They were slowed by Iranian air attacks and Revolutionary Guard troops with recoilless rifles, rocket-propelled grenades, and Molotov cocktails. The Iranians flooded the marsh areas around the city, forcing the Iraqis to traverse through narrow strips of land. Iraqi tanks launched attacks with no infantry support, and many tanks were lost to Iranian anti-tank teams. However, by 30 September, the Iraqis had managed to clear the Iranians from the outskirts of the city. The next day, the Iraqis launched infantry and armoured attacks into the city. After heavy house-to-house fighting, the Iraqis were repelled. On 14 October, the Iraqis launched a second offensive. The Iranians launched a controlled withdrawal from the city, street by street. By 24 October, most of the city was captured, and the Iranians evacuated across the Karun River. Some partisans remained, and fighting continued until 10 November.

== Iranian operations ==
=== Retaliatory airstrikes in Iraq ===
Though the Iraqi air invasion surprised the Iranians, the Iranian air force retaliated with an attack against Iraqi military bases and infrastructure in Operation Kaman 99 (Bow 99). Groups of F-4 Phantom and F-5 Tiger fighter jets attacked targets throughout Iraq, such as oil facilities, dams, petrochemical plants, and oil refineries, and included Mosul Airbase, Baghdad, and the Kirkuk oil refinery. Iraq was taken by surprise at the strength of the retaliation.

The Iranian force of AH-1J SeaCobra helicopter gunships began attacks on the advancing Iraqi divisions, along with F-4 Phantoms armed with Maverick missiles; they destroyed numerous armoured vehicles and impeded the Iraqi advance, though not completely halting it. Iran had discovered that a group of two or three low-flying F-4 Phantoms could hit targets almost anywhere in Iraq. Meanwhile, Iraqi air attacks on Iran were repulsed by Iran's F-14 Tomcat interceptor fighter jets, using Phoenix missiles, which downed a dozen of Iraq's Soviet-built fighters in the first two days of battle.

=== Destruction of Iraqi oil and nuclear facilities ===
The Iranian regular military, police forces, volunteer Basij, and Revolutionary Guards all conducted their operations separately; thus, the Iraqi invading forces did not face coordinated resistance. However, on 24 September, the Iranian Navy attacked Basra, Iraq, destroying two oil terminals near the Iraqi port Faw, which reduced Iraq's ability to export oil. Iran also responded with strong artillery fire; by September 29, 1980, a week after the initial Iraqi invasion, Iranian shells were landing around Faw every 25 seconds. The Iranian ground forces (primarily consisting of the Revolutionary Guard) retreated to the cities, where they set up defences against the invaders.

On 30 September, Iran's air force launched Operation Scorch Sword, striking and badly damaging the Osirak nuclear reactor near Baghdad.

By 1 October, Baghdad had been subjected to eight air attacks. In response, Iraq launched aerial strikes against Iranian targets.

== Aftermath ==
=== Iraqi strategic failure ===
The people of Iran, rather than turning against their still-weak Islamic Republic, rallied around their country. An estimated 200,000 fresh troops had arrived at the front by November, many of them ideologically committed volunteers.

Though Khorramshahr was finally captured, the battle had delayed the Iraqis enough to allow the large-scale deployment of the Iranian military. In November, Saddam ordered his forces to advance towards Dezful and Ahvaz, and lay siege to both cities. However, the Iraqi offensive had been badly damaged by Iranian armed forces and air power. Iran's air force had destroyed Iraq's army supply depots and fuel supplies, and was strangling the country through an aerial siege. On the other hand, Iran's supplies had not been exhausted, despite sanctions, and the military often cannibalised spare parts from other equipment and began searching for parts on the black market. On 28 November, Iran launched Operation Morvarid (Pearl), a combined air and sea attack that destroyed 80% of Iraq's navy and all of its radar sites in the southern portion of the country. When Iraq laid siege to Abadan and dug its troops in around the city, it was unable to blockade the port, which allowed Iran to resupply Abadan by sea.

=== Iranian counteroffensive ===
Iraq's strategic reserves had been depleted, and by now it lacked the power to go on any major offensives until nearly the end of the war. On 7 December, Hussein announced that Iraq was going on the defensive. By the end of 1980, Iraq had destroyed about 500 Western-built Iranian tanks and captured 100 others.

== See also ==
- Shatt al-Arab dispute

== Gallery ==
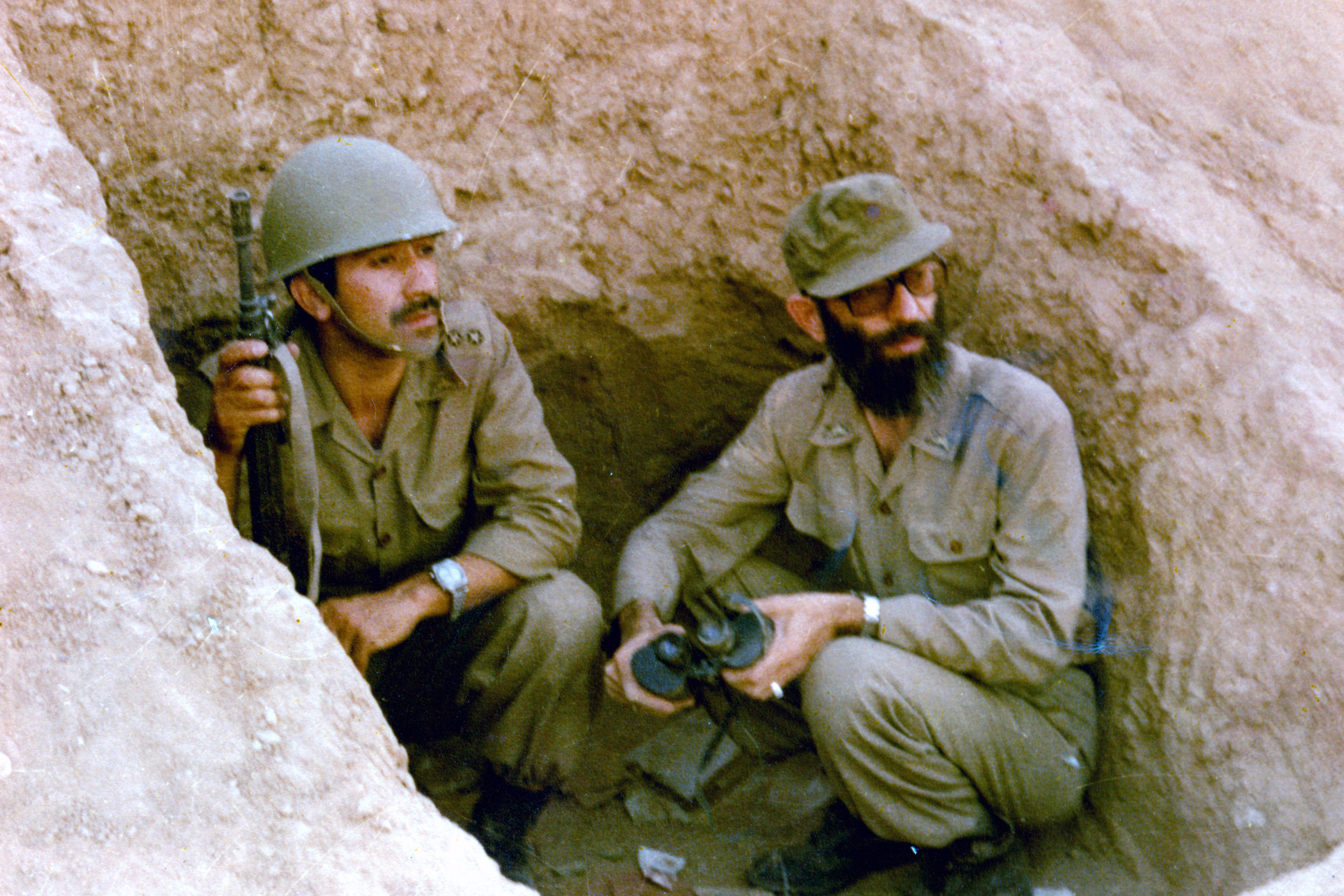
Ali Khamenei (right), who would become the second Supreme Leader of Iran in August 1989, in a spider hole with another Iranian soldier during the Iran–Iraq War

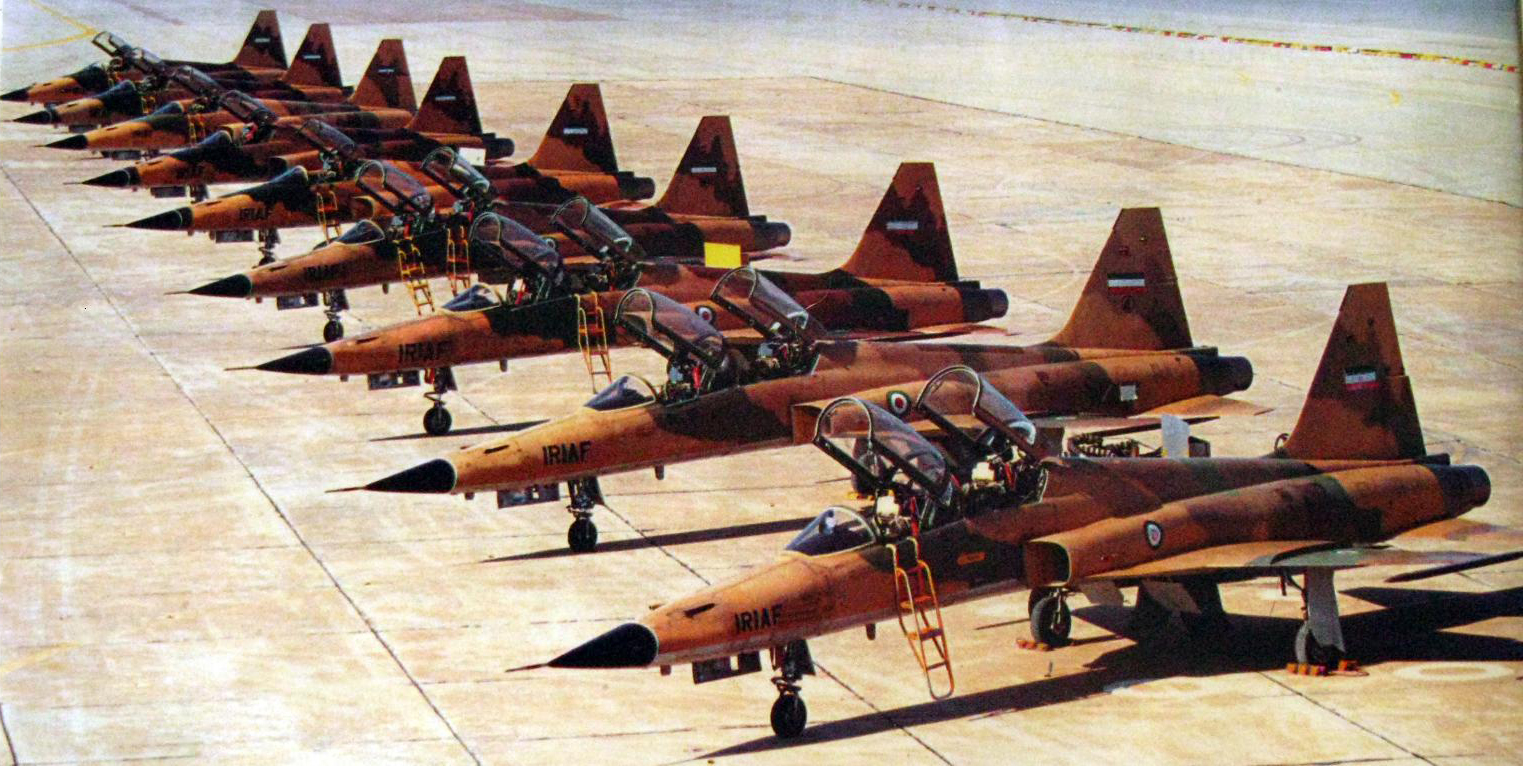
An Iranian Northrop F-5 squadron

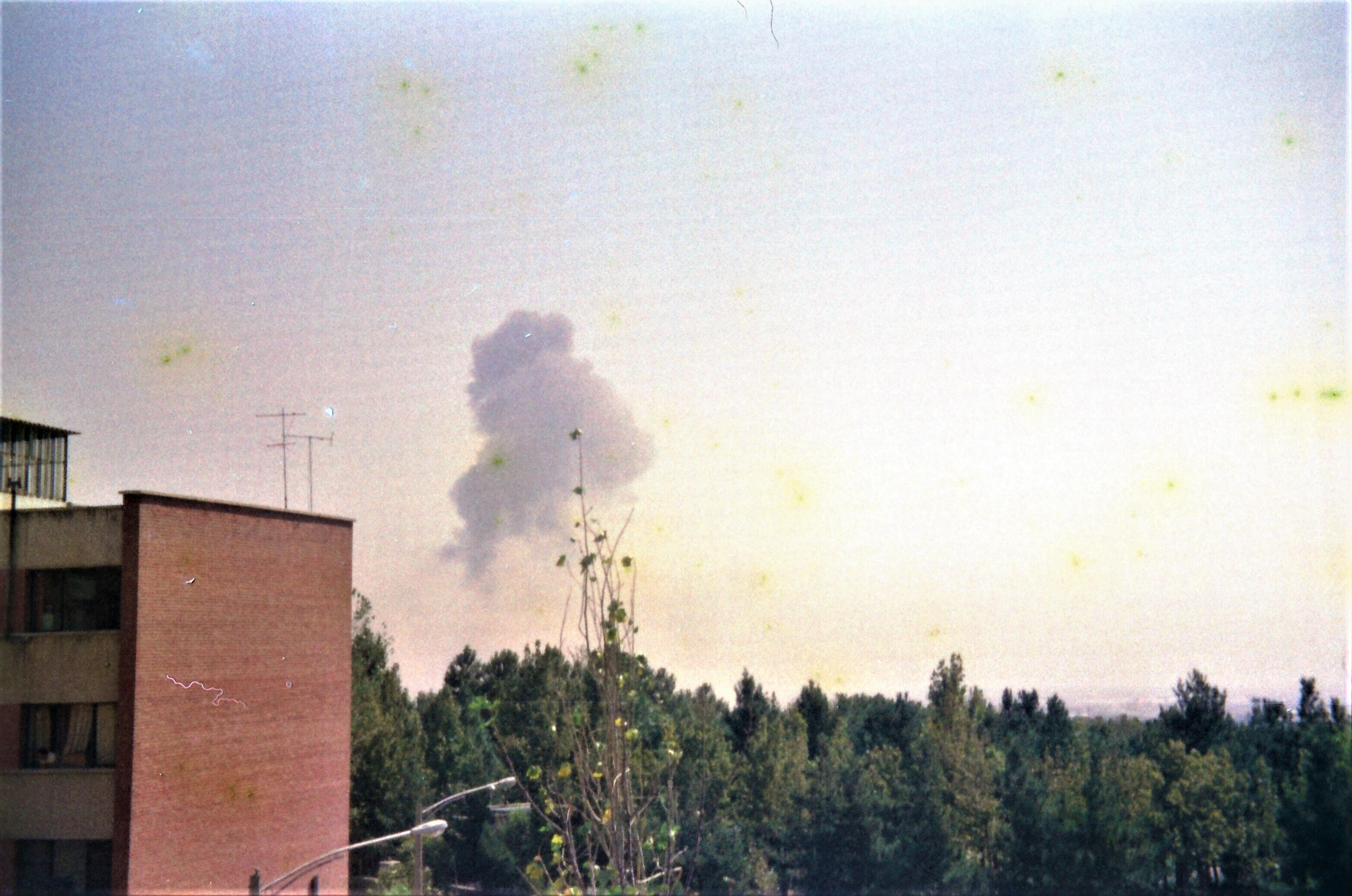
Explosion at Mehrabad International Airport in Tehran after an Iraqi airstrike

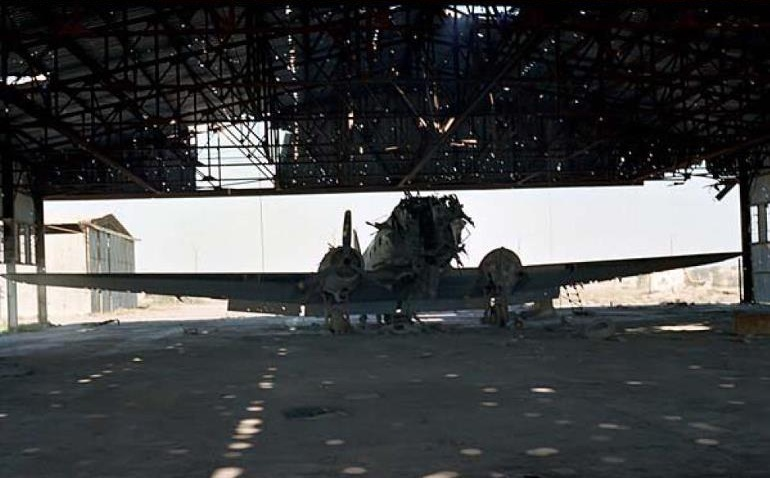
A destroyed Iranian Douglas C-47 Skytrain
