= Arvand Free Zone =

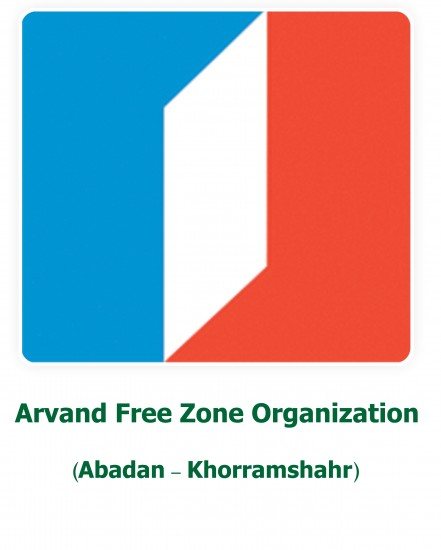
- Type: Free Economic Zone
- Headquarters: Abadan, Khorramshahr, Khuzestan, Iran
- Website: http://www.arvandfreezone.com

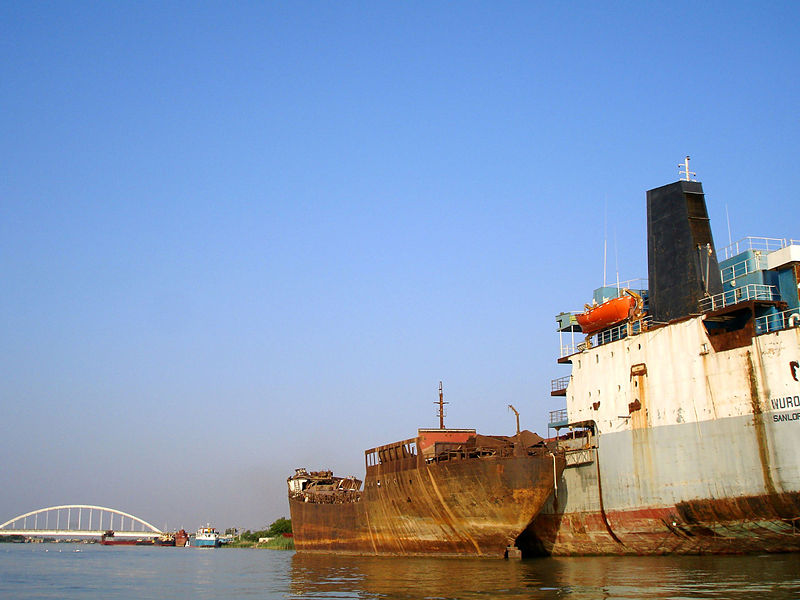
Easterly view of the Karoon River at Khorramshahr

The Arvand Free Zone with an area of 37,400 hectares is at the confluence of the Karun and Arvand (Shatt al-Arab) rivers. The Zone is located at a height of three meters above sea level and in proximity to Iraq and in the north west of Persian Gulf.

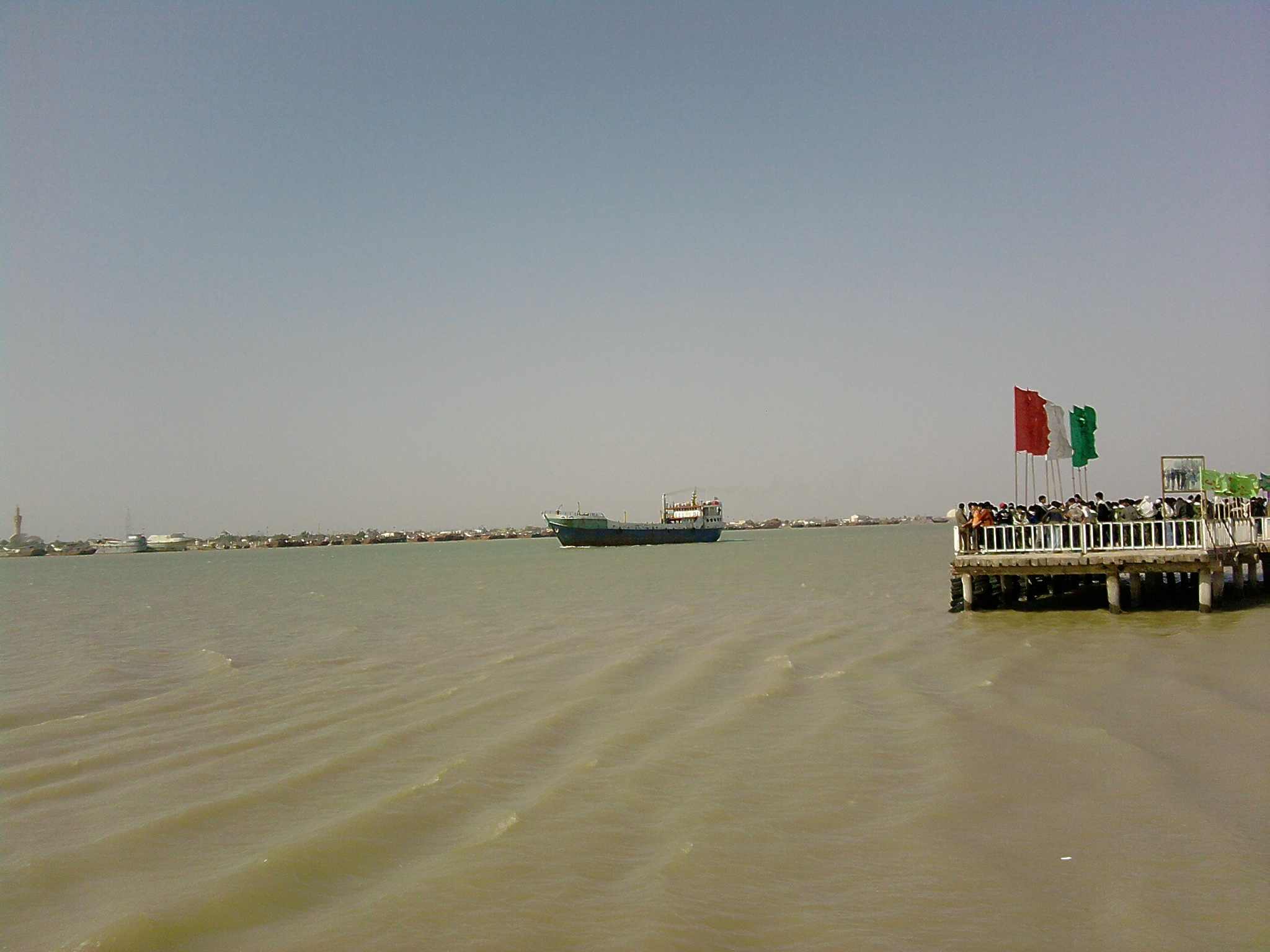
Arvandkenar

== Visa-free ==
Holders of normal passports travelling as tourists can enter Arvand Free Zone without a visa with maximum stay of 2 weeks (extendable), as of December 2017.

== Admission refused ==
Admission is refused to holders of passports or travel documents containing an Israeli visa or stamp or any data showing that visitor has been to Israel or indication of any connection with the state of Israel during the last 12 months.

== See also ==
- politics of Khuzestan
