= Operation Kaman 99 =

1980 Iran–Iraq War operation

- Part of the Iran–Iraq War
- Locations hit in Iraq
Date	23–26 September 1980 (4 days)
Location	Iraq
Result	Iranian victory

Belligerents
Iran	Iraq

Units involved
Iranian Air Force	Iraqi Air Force

Strength
200 aircraft, of which 140 attacked Iraq: 58 F-4 Phantom II fighter-bombers; 88 F-5E Tiger II fighters; 60 F-14 Tomcat interceptors; Boeing 707 and Boeing 747 tankers; C-130 Hercules transport aircraft; 380+ air force personnel	166-192 aircraft

Casualties and losses
24 aircraft lost	40 aircraft lost 11 airbases and other infrastructures bombed

Operation Alborz (Persian: عملیات البرز), more commonly known by the code-name Operation Kaman 99 (عملیات کمان 99), was an operation launched by the Iranian Air Force in retaliation to Iraqi surprise aerial attacks on Iran the day before which marked the beginning of the 8-year-long Iran–Iraq War. Involving nearly 200 aircraft (of which more than 140 crossed into Iraq), it is considered the largest operation carried out by the IRIAF. The outcome was clearly successful, as the Iranians achieved air superiority for the first years of the conflict.

Launched only 3 hours after the formal beginning of the war, the main attack was formed by 140 to 148 Iranian fighter-bombers, plus 60 interceptors and tankers were involved in this operation, and at least 380 air force personnel were also involved, making this the most large-scale operation conducted by the Iranian Air Force.

Kirkuk, Al-Rasheed, Nasiriya, Habbaniyah (including Tammuz), Shaiba, Kut, and Umm Qasr airbases, as well as Baghdad International Airport and Al-Muthanna Airport were bombed during the operation.

== Prelude ==
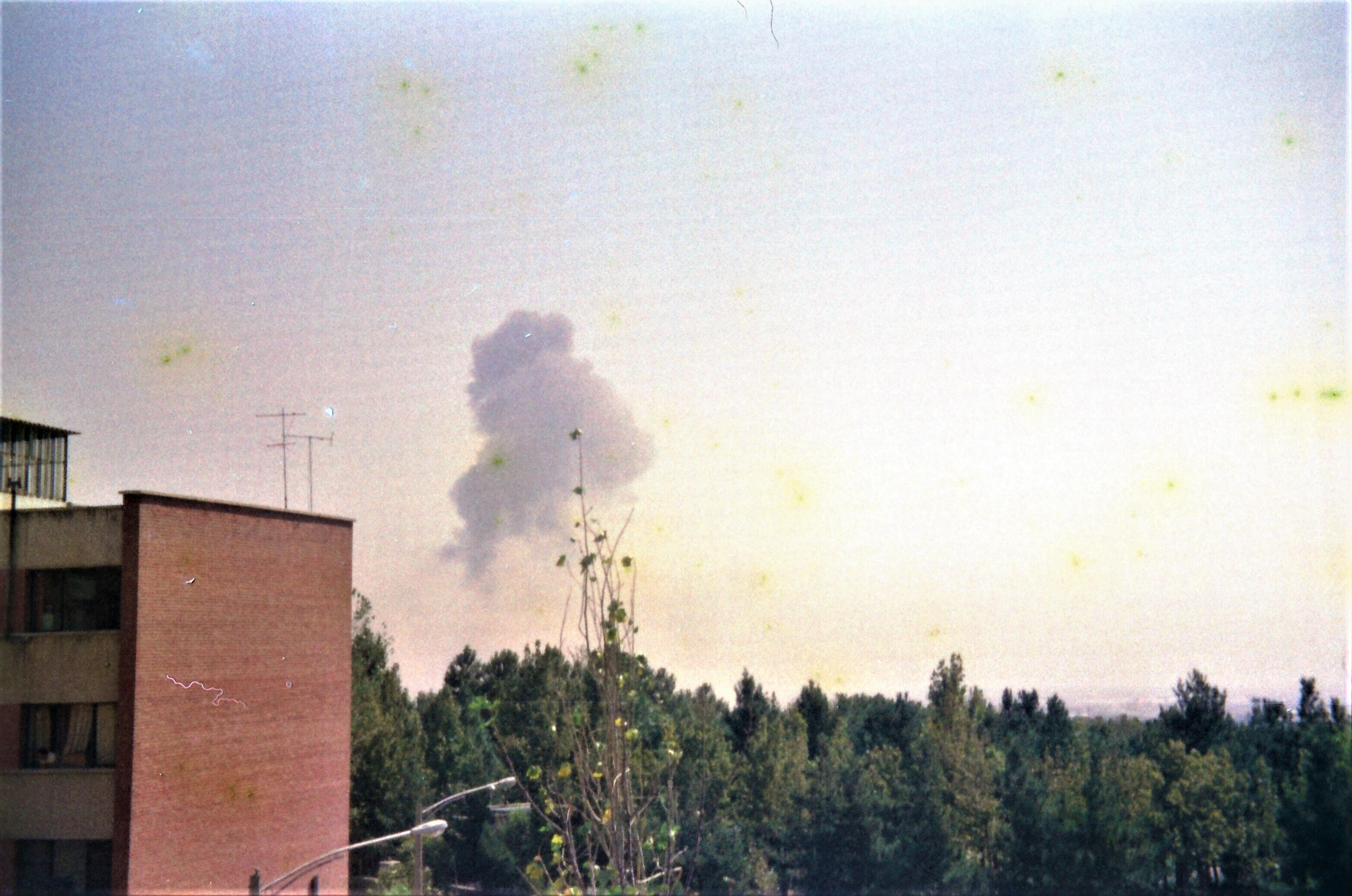
Explosion in Mehrabad Airport in Tehran after Iraqi forces attacked Tehran on 22 September, 1980

On 22 and 23 September 1980, Iraq launched surprise air strikes on strategic locations in Iran employing a total of 166 to 192 fighter and bomber aircraft for a total of 250 sorties.

At 1:45 pm local time, 6 Iraqi MiG-23 Floggers bombed an Iranian Air Base near Ahvaz.

Half an hour later, Iraqi MiG-23s attacked Mehrabad Airport in Tehran. At the same time the Iraqis also bombed 8 other major Air Bases in Iran.

Radio Baghdad asks Iranian pilots to defect to Iraq in a message after this operation.

However, having learned from the Six-Day War, Iran had built hardened aircraft shelters where most of its combat aircraft were stored, thus the Iraqis succeeded mainly in cratering Iranian runways (which were quickly repaired), without causing any significant damage to Iran's Air Force. Now the Iranian Air Force started preparing for a counter-attack which was to be launched the next day.

Two hours after this Iraqi attack, the Iranian air force conducted Operation Entegham (عملیات انتقام, "Revenge"), bombing Shaiba, Umm Qasr and Kut Air Bases in Iraq.

== The battle ==
At 5:00 AM on 23 September 1980, Iran launched Operation Kaman 99 as 40 F-4 Phantoms, armed with Mark 82, Mark 83 and Mark 84 bombs and AGM-65 Maverick missiles, took off from Hamadan Air Base. After refueling in mid-air the Phantoms reached the Iraqi capital Baghdad, where they attacked al-Rasheed, Habbaniyah and Kut airbases. Meanwhile, eight more F-4s took off from Tehran's Mehrabad and launched a second attack on the al-Rasheed Air Base.

Iran launched 58 F-5E Tiger IIs from Tabriz Air Base, which were sent to attack Mosul Air Base. After the attack on Mosul Air Base, 50 F-5Es attacked Nasiriya Air Base, which was heavily damaged.

As all 148 Iranian F-4s and F-5s had been sent for a bombing raid on Iraq, 60 F-14 Tomcats were scrambled to defend Iranian airspace against a possible Iraqi retaliation. Iranian F-14s managed to down 2 Iraqi MiG-21s (1 MiG-21RF and 1 MiG-21MF) and 3 Iraqi MiG-23s (MiG-23MS), an Iranian F-5E also shot down an Iraqi Su-20 during the operation.

Timeline of the air raids are as follows:

- 48 F-5E fighter-bombers from Tabriz Air Base bombed Mosul Air Base. The Air Base was not operable "for months".
- 40 F-5E fighter-bombers from Dezful Air Base bombed Nasiriya Air Base.
- 16 F-4E fighter-bombers from Hamadan Air Base bombed Kut Air Base. According to Iranian reports, the airbase was completely destroyed.
- 12 F-4E fighter-bombers from Bushehr Air Base bombed Shaiba Air Base.
- 12 F-4E fighter-bombers from Hamadan Air Base bombed Al-Rasheed Air Base near Baghdad, destroying 80% of it. Several MiG-23s were destroyed on the ground.
- 8 F-4E fighter-bombers from Hamadan Air Base bombed Baghdad International Airport and Northern Habbaniya Air Base (including Tammuz airbase) west of Baghdad.
- Kirkuk Air Base, Al-Muthanna Airport and other targets were bombed in later air raids.

The Iranian planes flew so low that a billboard of Basra municipality got hooked on the tail of one of the Iranian F-4s, which was discovered upon landing at Bushehr Air Base. The Iranian aircraft were flying so low that the power cables on the outskirts of the major Iraqi cities became a significant risk for the Iranian pilots if they were not cautious enough.

== Aftermath ==
Saddam Hussein and the Iraqi military were dealt a heavy blow when Iranian Air Force vulnerabilities failed to materialize. All Iraqi Air Bases near Iran were rendered inoperable for weeks and, according to Iran, Iraq's aerial efficiency was reduced by 55%. The Iranians on the other hand had taken heavy losses as well, as up to 67 aircraft had been shot down during the operation over Iraqi airspace by a combination of AAA, SAM, and Air defense fighters. According to most observers, this is one of the biggest air battles in history. This operation, allowed the Iranians to regroup and prepare for the upcoming Iraqi invasion. However, Iraqis would advance deep into Khuzestan and it would take the Iranians up to 2 years before they would finally expel the Iraqis from their territory and eventually enter Iraq. The War endured another 6 years, becoming the longest conventional war of the 20th century in which perhaps close to one million were maimed and killed.

== In popular culture ==
- Iranian book "140+8 Aircraft" (Persian: 8+140 فروندی), written by Brigadier General Ahmad Mehrnia
- Marjane Satrapi mentions the battle in a chapter of her autobiographical graphic novel Persepolis, where the father of her former classmate Pardisse Entezami was killed in action.

== See also ==
- Islamic Republic of Iran Air Force#Iran–Iraq War (1980–88)
