= Shatt al-Arab dispute =

Former territorial dispute between Iran and Iraq

The Shatt al-Arab dispute was a territorial dispute that took place in the Shatt al-Arab region from 1936 until 1975. The Shatt al-Arab was considered an important channel for the oil exports of both Iran and Iraq, and in 1937, Iran and the newly independent Iraq signed a treaty to settle the dispute. In the 1975 Algiers Agreement, Iraq made territorial concessions—including the Shatt al-Arab waterway—in exchange for normalized relations. In return for Iraq agreeing that the frontier on the waterway ran along the entire thalweg, Iran ended its support for the Peshmerga in the Second Iraqi–Kurdish War. The Iraqi government reneged on the agreement shortly before launching the Iran–Iraq War in 1980, but accepted it once more after the war.

== Background ==
Since the Ottoman–Persian Wars of the 16th and 17th centuries, Iran (known as "Persia" prior to 1935) and the Ottomans fought over Iraq (then Mesopotamia) and full control of the Shatt al-Arab until the signing of the Treaty of Zuhab in 1639 which established the final borders between the two countries.

== Clashes ==
=== Pahlavi Iran–Iraqi Kingdom tensions ===
The Shatt al-Arab was considered an important channel for both states' oil exports, and in 1937, Iran and the newly independent Iraq signed a treaty to settle the dispute. That year, Iran and Iraq joined the Treaty of Saadabad, reestablishing good relations for decades.

=== Pahlavi Iran–Ba'athist Iraq tensions ===
==== Crisis in relations, 1969–1974 ====
In April 1969, Iran abrogated the 1937 treaty and ceased paying tolls to Iraq when its ships used the waterway. This marked the beginning of a period of acute Iraqi-Iranian tension that continued until the 1975 Algiers Agreement. In 1969, Saddam Hussein, Iraq's deputy prime minister, stated: "Iraq's dispute with Iran is in connection with Khuzestan, which is part of Iraq's soil and was annexed to Iran during foreign rule."

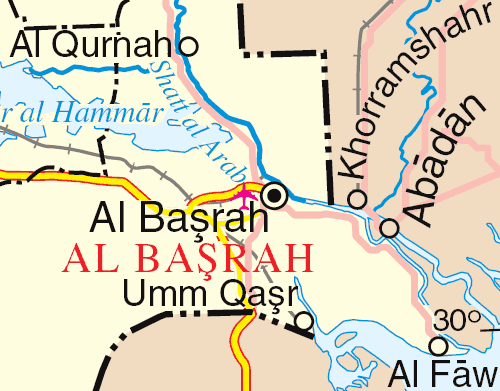
The Shatt al-Arab on the Iran–Iraq border

In 1971, Iraq (now under Saddam's effective rule) broke diplomatic relations with Iran after claiming sovereignty rights over the islands of Abu Musa, Greater and Lesser Tunbs in the Persian Gulf following the withdrawal of the British. As retaliation for Iraq's claims to Khuzestan, Iran became the main patron of Iraq's Kurdish rebels in the early 1970s, giving the Iraqi Kurds bases in Iran and arming the Kurdish groups. In addition to Iraq fomenting separatism in Iran's Khuzestan and Balochistan, both states encouraged separatist activities by Kurdish nationalists in the other state.

==== Military clashes, 1974–1975 ====
From March 1974 to March 1975, Iran and Iraq fought border skirmishes over Iran's support of Iraqi Kurds. In 1975, the Iraqis launched an offensive into Iran using tanks, though the Iranians defeated them. Several other attacks took place; however, Iran had the world's fifth most powerful military at the time and easily defeated the Iraqis with its air force. Some 1,000 people died over the course of the 1974–75 clashes in the Shatt al-Arab region. As a result, Iraq decided against continuing the war, choosing instead to make concessions to Tehran to end the Kurdish rebellion. In the 1975 Algiers Agreement, Iraq made territorial concessions—including the Shatt al-Arab waterway—in exchange for normalised relations. In return for Iraq recognising that the frontier on the waterway ran along the entire thalweg, Iran ended its support of Iraq's Kurdish guerrillas.

=== After the Iranian Revolution ===
Despite Iraq's goals of regaining the Shatt al-Arab, the Iraqi government seemed to initially welcome Iran's Revolution, which overthrew Iran's Shah, who was seen as a common enemy. On 17 September 1980, Iraq suddenly abrogated the Algiers Protocol following the Iranian revolution. Saddam Hussein claimed that the Islamic Republic of Iran refused to abide by the stipulations of the Algiers Protocol and, therefore, Iraq considered the Protocol null and void. Five days later, the Iraqi army crossed the border.

== See also ==
- Iraqi invasion of Iran (1980)
