= Shatt al-Arab =

River in West Asia

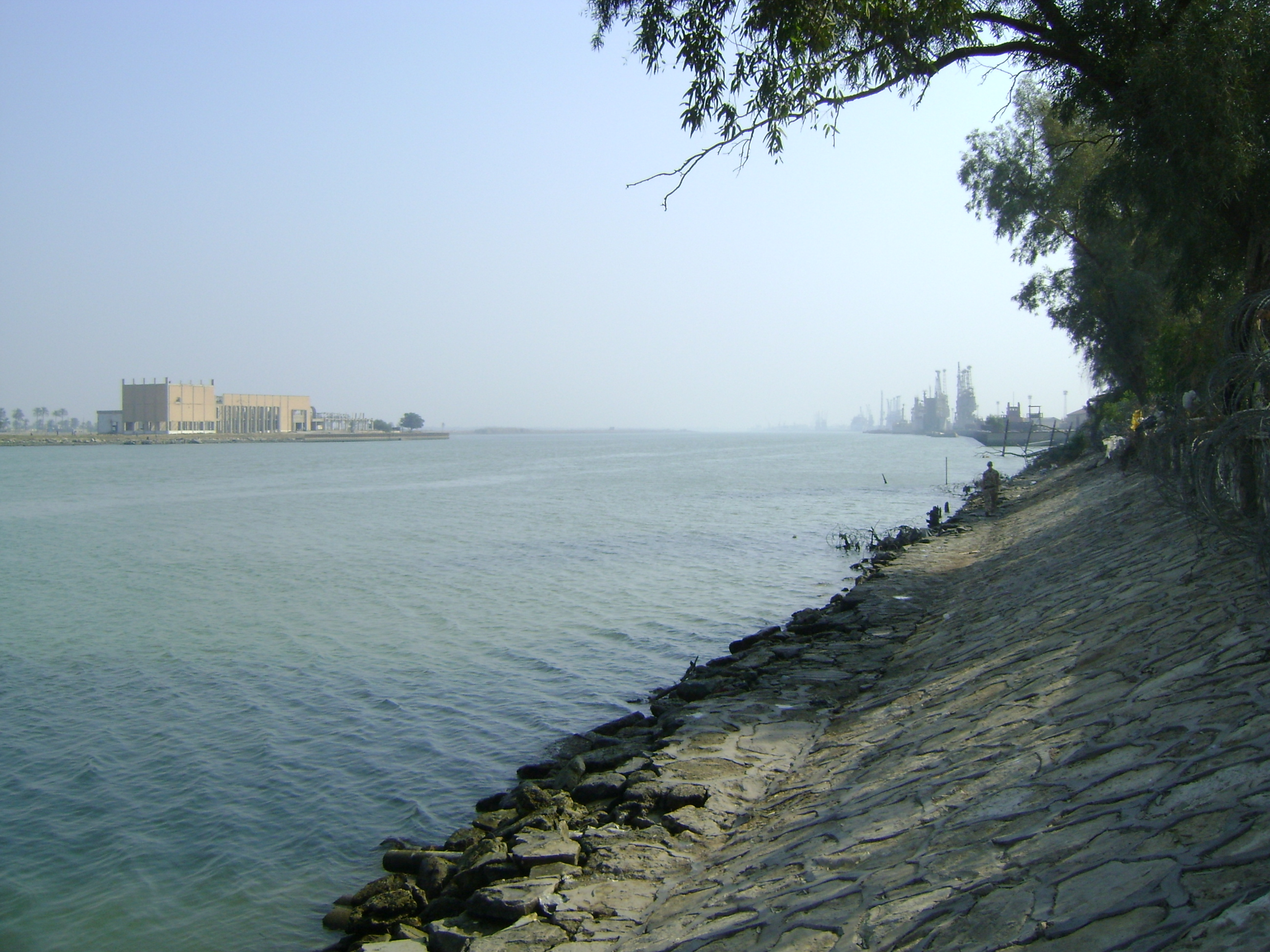
- Shatt al-Arab pictured near Basra, Iraq

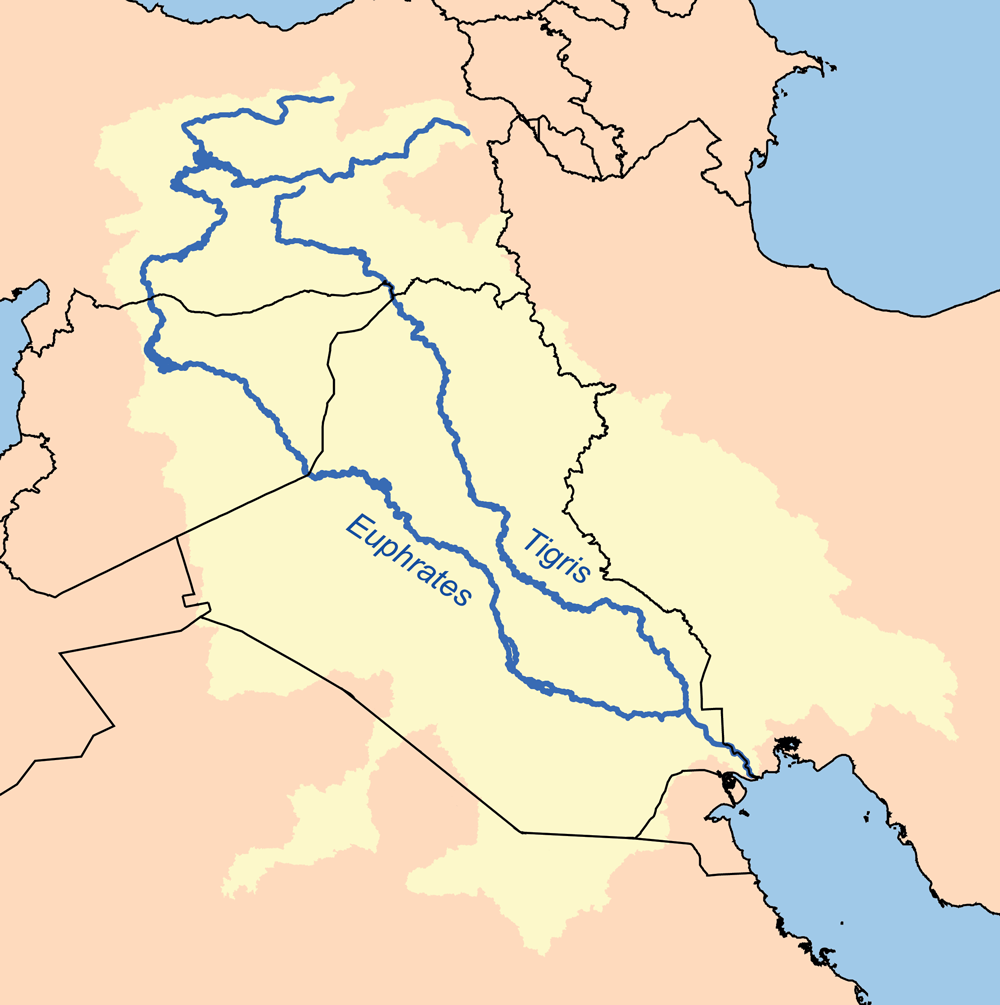
- Drainage basin and two major tributaries
- Native name: Arabic: شط العرب

Location
- Country: Iran, Iraq, Kuwait

Physical characteristics
- Source: Euphrates
  - elevation: 4 m (13 ft)
- 2nd source: Tigris
  - elevation: 4 m (13 ft)
- Mouth
  - location: Persian Gulf
  - coordinates: 30°24′15.59″N 48°09′3.60″E
  - elevation: 0 m (0 ft)
- Length: 204 km (127 mi): 200 km (120 mi) from confluence of Tigris-Euphrates; 3,596 km (2,234 mi) total length including Euphrates
- Basin size: 938,173 km^{2} (362,231 mi^{2}) to 884,000 km^{2} (341,000 mi^{2})
- Width
  - minimum: 250 m (820 ft)
  - maximum: 1,500 m (4,900 ft)
- Discharge
  - location: Shatt al-Arab Delta, Persian Gulf
  - average: (Period: 1971–2000)3,535 m^{3}/s (124,800 cu ft/s) (Period: 1977–2018)105.7 km^{3}/a (3,350 m^{3}/s)
- Discharge
  - location: Abadan, Iran
  - average: (Period: 1971–2000)3,531.6 m^{3}/s (124,720 cu ft/s)
- Discharge
  - location: Basra, Iraq
  - average: (Period: 1971–2000)2,782.8 m^{3}/s (98,270 cu ft/s)
- Discharge
  - location: Al-Qurnah, Iraq (confluence of Tigris and Euphrates rivers)
  - average: (Period: 1971–2000)2,531.8 m^{3}/s (89,410 cu ft/s)

Basin features
- Tributaries
  - left: Tigris, Alswaib canal, Karun
  - right: Euphrates

The Shatt al-Arab (Arabic: شط العرب, lit. 'River of the Arabs') is a river about 200 kilometres (120 mi) in length that is formed at the confluence of the Euphrates and Tigris rivers in the town of al-Qurnah in the Basra Governorate of southern Iraq. The southern end of the river constitutes the Iran–Iraq border down to its mouth, where it discharges into the Persian Gulf. The Shatt al-Arab varies in width from about 232 metres (761 ft) at Basra to 800 metres (2,600 ft) at its mouth. It is thought that the waterway formed relatively recently in geological time, with the Tigris and Euphrates originally emptying into the Persian Gulf via a channel further to the west. Kuwait's Bubiyan Island is part of the Shatt al-Arab delta. The Shatt al-Arab is a navigable river of high importance to Iraq's petroleum industry due to Basra's status as a major port for loading oil tankers.

The Karun, a tributary which joins the waterway from the Iranian side, deposits large amounts of silt into the river; this necessitates continuous dredging to keep it navigable.

The area used to hold the largest date palm forest in the world. In the mid-1970s, the region included 17–18 million date palms: an estimated one-fifth of the world's 90 million palm trees. However, by 2002, more than 14 million of the palms had been wiped out by the combined factors of war, salt and pests; this count includes around 9 million palms in Iraq and 5 million in Iran. Many of the remaining 3–4 million trees are in poor health.

== Naming ==
The river is also known in Iraq as the Dijla al-Awara (دجلة العوراء) and in Iran as the Arvand Rud (Persian: اروندرود, lit. 'Valiant River').

The Persian epic poem Shahnameh (written between c. 977–1010 CE) and many other works of Middle Persian literature use the name Arvand (اروند) for the Tigris River, the confluent of the Shatt al-Arab. Iranians also used this name specifically to designate the Shatt al-Arab during the later Pahlavi era, and continue to do so since the 1979 Iranian Revolution.

== Geography ==
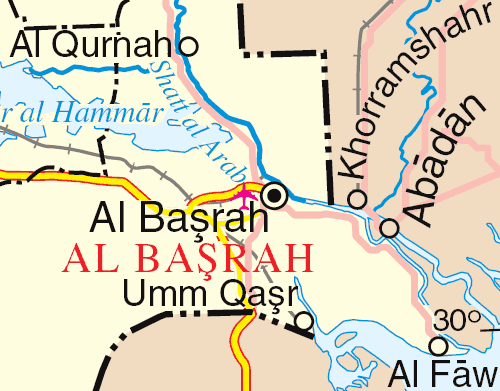
Map

The Shatt al-Arab is formed by the confluence of the Tigris and Euphrates rivers at Al-Qurnah, and flows into the Persian Gulf south of the city of Al-Faw. It receives the Karun at Khorramshahr.

== History ==
The Shatt al-Arab originally extended to the Ur Schatt river system that fed the Pleistocene/Holocene Arabian Gulf Oasis, a system of linked lakes and flood plains that stretched to the Strait of Hormuz and emptied into the Gulf of Oman. This system flooded in the period 12,000 - 7,000 BCE to form the present-day Persian Gulf.

Dispute over the river occurred during the Ottoman-Safavid era, prior to the establishment of an independent Iraq in the 20th century. In the early 16th century, the Iranian Safavids gained most of what is present-day Iraq, including Shatt al-Arab. They later lost these territories to the expanding Ottomans following the Peace of Amasya (1555).

In the early 17th century, the Safavids under king (shah) Abbas I (r. 1588–1629) once again regained Shatt al-Arab. Control of the river was at last permanently ceded to the Ottomans with the Treaty of Zuhab in 1639. Control of the waterway was also temporarily lost by the Safavids to the Ottomans in this treaty. In general, the Treaty of Zuhab roughly re-established the common borders of the Ottomans and Safavid Empires the way they had been in 1555. However, the treaty never demarcated a precise and fixed boundary regarding the frontier in the south.

Later, Nader Shah (r. 1736–1747) succeeded in restoring Iranian control over Shatt al-Arab for a time. With the Treaty of Kerden (1746), however, the Zuhab boundaries were restored, ceding the river to the Turks once again. The First Treaty of Erzurum (1823) concluded between Ottoman Turkey and Qajar Iran, resulted in the same.

The Second Treaty of Erzurum was signed by Ottoman Turkey and Qajar Iran in 1847 after protracted negotiations, which included British and Russian delegates. Even afterwards, backtracking and disagreements continued, until British Foreign Secretary, Lord Palmerston, was moved to comment in 1851 that "the boundary line between Turkey and Persia can never be finally settled except by an arbitrary decision on the part of Great Britain and Russia". A protocol between the Ottomans and the Persians was signed in Istanbul in 1913, which declared that the Ottoman-Persian frontier run along the thalweg, but World War I canceled all plans.

Coat of arms of the Kingdom of Iraq 1932–1959 depicting the Shatt and the forest

During the Mandate of Iraq (1920–1932), the British advisors in Iraq were able to keep the waterway binational under the thalweg principle that worked in Europe: the dividing line was a line drawn between the deepest points along the stream bed. In 1937, Iran and Iraq signed a treaty that settled the dispute over control of the Shatt al-Arab. The 1937 treaty recognized the Iranian-Iraqi border as along the low-water mark on the eastern side of the Shatt al-Arab except at Abadan and Khorramshahr where the frontier ran along the thalweg (the deep water line) which gave Iraq control of almost the entire waterway; provided that all ships using the Shatt al-Arab fly the Iraqi flag and have an Iraqi pilot, and required Iran to pay tolls to Iraq whenever its ships used the Shatt al-Arab. Shah Reza Shah of Iran together with his close friend President Mustafa Kemal Atatürk of Turkey had been promoting the Saadabad pact intended to protect the neutrality of Muslim nations if the world should be plunged into war again. In return for the Shatt al-Arab treaty, Iraq joined the Saadabad pact and Iranian-Iraqi relations were friendly for decades afterward. The Saadabad pact ultimately brought together Turkey, Iraq, Iran and Afghanistan in an alliance intended to protect their neutrality. In 1955, both Iran and Iraq were founding members of the Baghdad Pact alliance.

The Shatt al-Arab and the forest were depicted in the middle of the coat of arms of the Kingdom of Iraq, from 1932 to 1959.

Arab ferryman on the Shatt al-Arab 1958

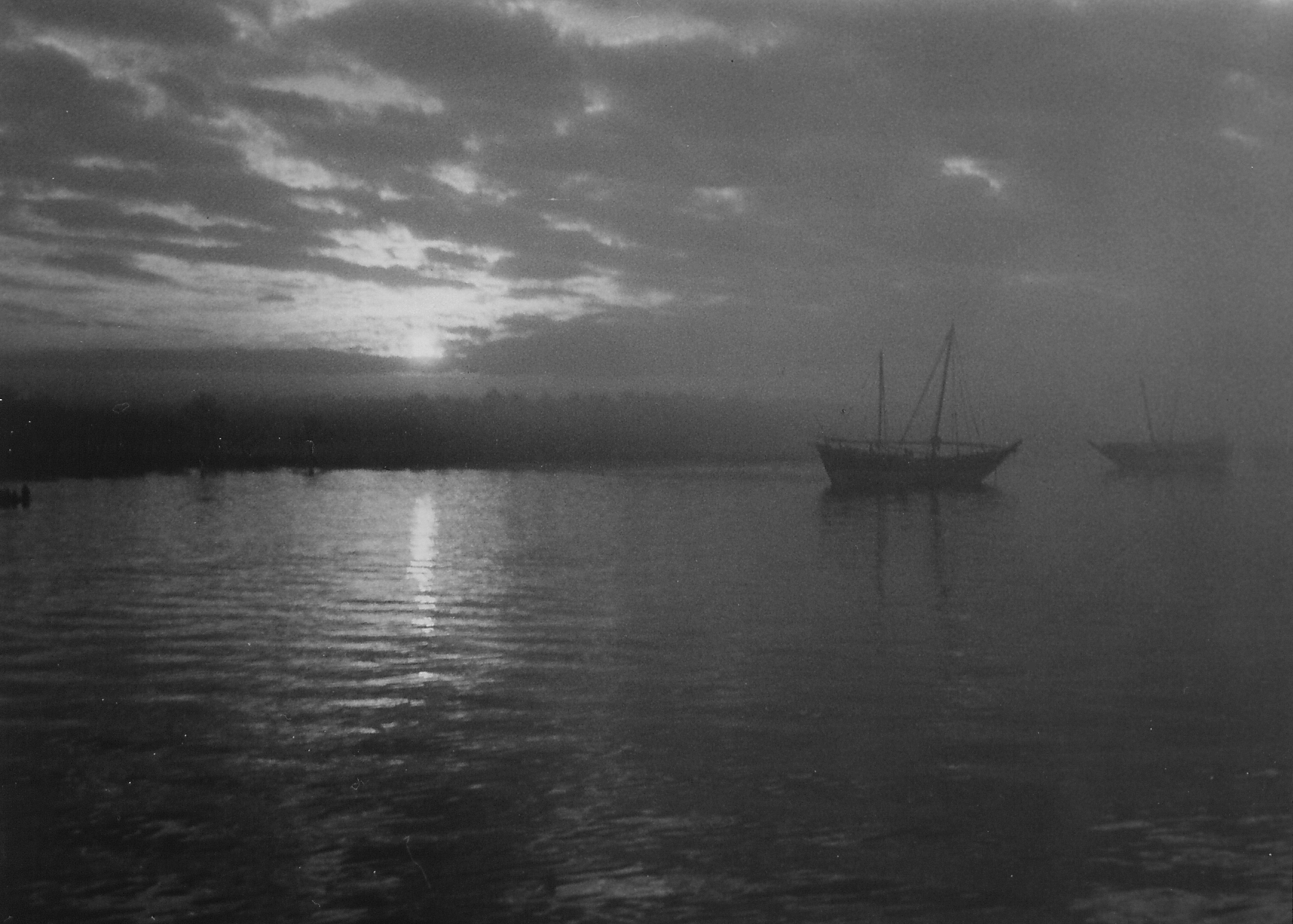
Evening atmosphere on the Shatt al-Arab

Under Shah Mohammad Reza Pahlavi in the late 1960s, Iran developed a strong military and took a more assertive stance in the Near East. In April 1969, Iran abrogated the 1937 treaty over the Shatt al-Arab and Iranian ships stopped paying tolls to Iraq when they used the Shatt al-Arab. The Shah argued that the 1937 treaty was unfair to Iran because almost all river borders around the world ran along the thalweg, and because most of the ships that used the Shatt al-Arab were Iranian. Iraq threatened war over the Iranian move, but on 24 April 1969, an Iranian tanker escorted by Iranian warships (Joint Operation Arvand) sailed down the Shatt al-Arab, and Iraq—being the militarily weaker state—did nothing. The Iranian abrogation of the 1937 treaty marked the beginning of a period of acute Iraqi-Iranian tension that was to last until the Algiers Accords of 1975.

All United Nations attempts to intervene and mediate the dispute were rebuffed. Baathist Iraq claimed the frontier agreed to in 1937 was still the legitimate frontier. In response, Iran in the early 1970s became the main patron of Iraqi Kurdish groups fighting for independence from Iraq. In 1974 with the open encouragement and support of Iran, the Iraqi Kurdish peshmerga rebelled against Iraq, and instead of waging a guerrilla war, the peshmerga fought a conventional war against Iraq, leading to very intense fighting. In the winter of 1974–75, Iran and Iraq almost went to war over Iran's support of the Kurds in Iraq (see 1974–75 Shatt al-Arab conflict). However, given Iran's greater military strength and population, the Iraqis decided against war, and chose to make concessions to Tehran to end the Kurdish rebellion. In March 1975, Vice President Saddam Hussein of Iraq and the Shah signed the Algiers Accord in which Iraq recognized a series of straight lines closely approximating the thalweg (deepest channel) of the waterway, as the official border, in exchange for which Iran ended its support of the Iraqi Kurds. The Algiers Accord was seen as a national humiliation in Iraq, causing much bitterness over what was seen as Iranian bullying. However, the Algiers Accord saw Iran cease supporting the peshmerga as the Iranians closed the frontier, causing the Kurdish rebellion to promptly collapse. The British journalist Patrick Brogan wrote that "the Iraqis celebrated their victory in the usual manner, by executing as many of the rebels as they could lay their hands on".

In 1980, President Saddam Hussein of Iraq abrogated the 1975 treaty and Iraq invaded Iran. The main thrust of the military movement on the ground was across the waterway which was the stage for most of the military battles between the two armies. The waterway was Iraq's only outlet to the Persian Gulf, and thus, its shipping lanes were greatly affected by continuous Iranian attacks.

When Al-Faw peninsula was captured by the Iranians in 1986, Iraq's shipping activities virtually came to a halt and had to be diverted to other Arab ports such as Kuwait and even Aqaba, Jordan. On 17 April 1988, Operation Ramadan Mubarak Materialized which saw Al-Faw peninsula recaptured after three days of fighting. After retaking Al-Faw, the Iraqis began a sustained drive to clear the Iranians out of all of southern Iraq. In May 1988, the Iraqis expelled the Iranians from Salamchech and took Majnun Island. During the fighting in the spring of 1988, the Iranians showed all the signs of collapsing morale. Brogan reported:

Reports from the front, both at Faw [Fao] and outside Basra, indicated that the Iranian resistance was surprisingly weak. The army that had shown such courage and élan early in the war now broke in a rout, and fled before the Arabs.

During the 1988 battles, the Iranians seemed tired and worn out by the nearly eight years of the war, and "put up very little resistance" to the Iraqi offensives. After the Iran–Iraq War, both sides agreed to once again treat the Algiers Accord as binding.

=== Conflicts ===
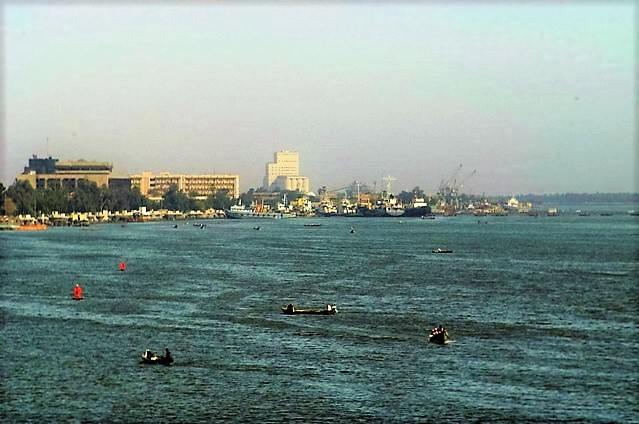
Shatt al-Arab near Basra city, Iraq

==== Iranian–Iraqi dispute ====
Conflicting territorial claims and disputes over navigation rights between Iran and Iraq were among the main factors for the beginning of the Iran–Iraq War that lasted from 1980 to 1988, when the pre-1980 status quo was restored. The Iranian cities and major ports of Abadan and Khorramshahr and the Iraqi cities and major ports of Basra and Al-Faw are situated along this river.

==== Gulf War and Iraq War ====
During the 2003 invasion of Iraq, the waterway was a key military target for the coalition forces. Since it is the only outlet to the Persian Gulf, its capture was important in delivering humanitarian aid to the rest of the country, and stopping the flow of operations trying to break the naval blockade against Iraq. The British Royal Marines staged an amphibious assault to capture the key oil installations and shipping docks located at Umm Qasr on the al-Faw peninsula at the onset of the conflict.

Following the end of the war, the UK was given responsibility, subsequently mandated by United Nations Security Council Resolution 1723, to patrol the waterway and the area of the Persian Gulf surrounding the river mouth. They were tasked until 2007 to make sure that ships in the area were not being used to transport munitions into Iraq. British forces also trained Iraqi naval units to take over the responsibility of guarding their waterways after the Coalition Forces left Iraq in December 2011.

On two separate occasions, Iranian forces operating on the Shatt al-Arab captured British Royal Navy sailors who they claim trespassed into their territory:

- In 2004, several British servicemen were held for two days after purportedly straying into the Iranian side of the waterway. After being initially threatened with prosecution, they were released after high-level conversations between British Foreign Secretary Jack Straw and Iranian Foreign Minister Kamal Kharrazi. The initial hardline approach came down to power struggles within the Iranian government. The British marines' weapons and boats were confiscated.
- In 2007, a seizure of fifteen more British personnel became a major diplomatic crisis between the two nations. It was resolved after thirteen days when the Iranians unexpectedly released the captives under an "amnesty".

== See also ==
- Arvand Free Zone
- al-Qurnah
- Shafi
- Wildlife of Iraq
- Shatt al-Arab dispute

== Sources ==
- Dougherty, Beth K.; Ghareeb, Edmund A. (2013). Historical Dictionary of Iraq (2 ed.). Scarecrow Press. ISBN 978-0810879423.
- Kia, Mehrdad (2017). The Ottoman Empire: A Historical Encyclopedia. ABC-CLIO. ISBN 978-1610693899.
- Mikaberidze, Alexander (2015). Historical Dictionary of Georgia (2 ed.). Rowman & Littlefield. ISBN 978-1442241466.
- Potts, D. T. (2004). "SHATT AL-ARAB". Encyclopaedia Iranica.
- Shaw, Stanford (1991). "Iranian Relations with the Ottoman Empire in the Eighteenth and Nineteenth Centuries". In Avery, Peter; Hambly, Gavin; Melville, Charles (eds.). The Cambridge History of Iran (Vol. 7). Cambridge University Press. ISBN 978-0857451842.
