= 2nd Squadron (Iraq) =

Helicopter squadron

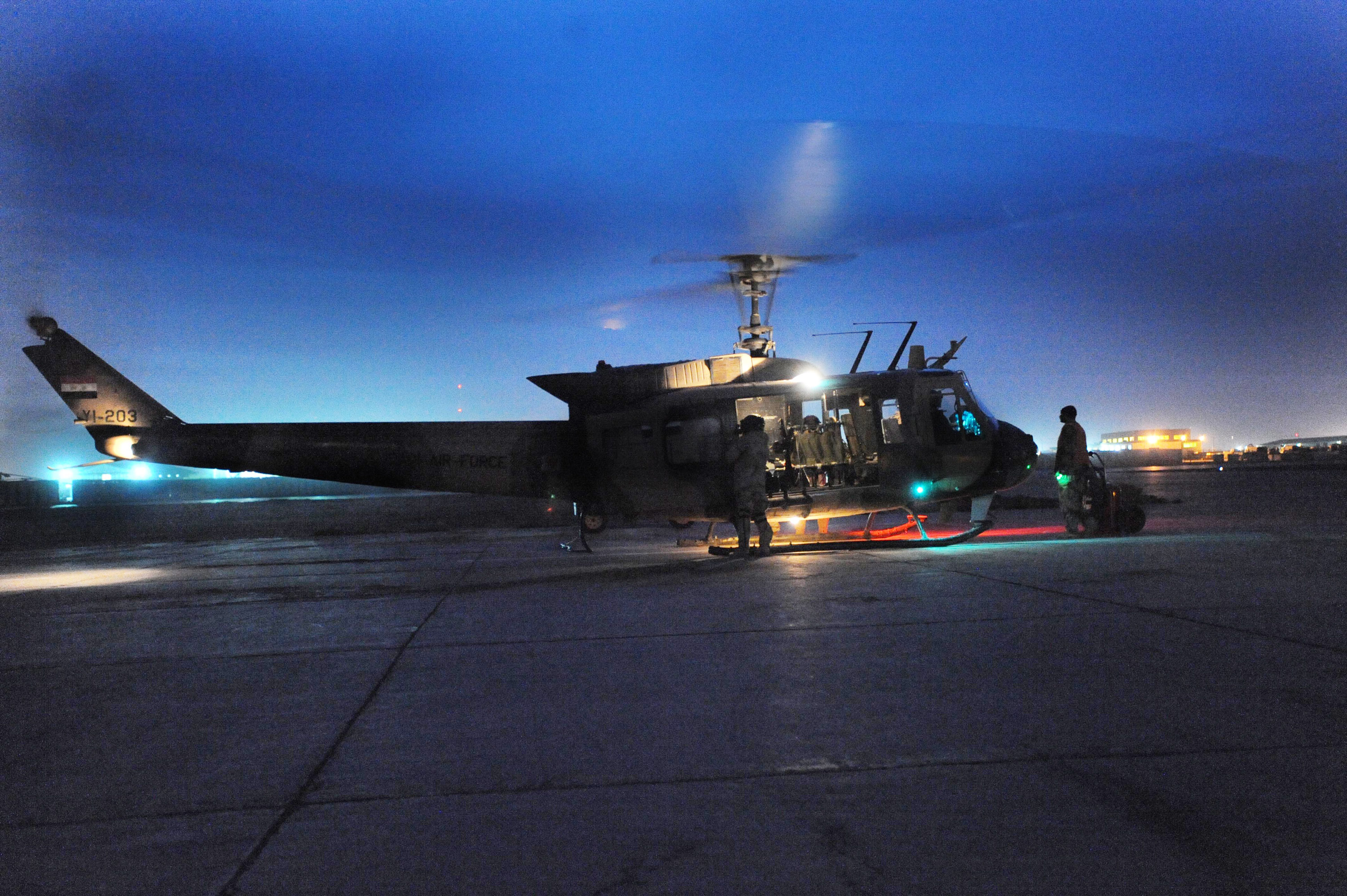
Night flying certification for the UH-1 crews of the Iraqi 2nd Squadron

The 2nd Squadron, Iraqi Air Force was a helicopter squadron.

It was first established in 1961 flying Mil Mi-4 Rasheed Air Base. It was still operating from Rasheed in 1964 with Mi-4s & Westland Wessexs.

After the 2003 invasion of Iraq, the squadron was reestablished under U.S. auspices at Taji in 2004-05 flying donated Jordanian UH-1s, but suffered severe spares shortages. "The mission failure at Taji should have come as no surprise, if only because it happened in slow motion and in full view. Its immediate cause was a lack of spares, but that shortage was only the latest in a lengthy series of neglects. In a detailed end-of-tour analysis submitted in late June [2005], departing 6th SOS advisor Major William Denehan pulled no punches. He wrote, “IqAF 2nd Squadron is currently non-functional.. ..Aircraft acquisition was poorly managed, unplanned, and unsupported... [and] overall IqAF development has been severely neglected and poorly managed”.

The planned remedy was to refurbish the helicopters in the United States to Huey II standard. "A year after a number of Huey IIs were delivered to an Alabama-based contractor, the first shipment of five rebuilt helicopters returned to Iraq on 16 February [2007]. Following several days’ reassembly and flight testing at NAMAB, they were turned over to Squadron 2 at Taji. Over the next few months, several were occasionally flown back to NAMAB, Phoenix Base, and Baghdad’s Green Zone to take Iraqi defense officials aloft for the benefit of the press; these excursions were moments of considerable pride for the IqAF. Otherwise, the Hueys were used to train Iraqi airmen. Although the rebuilt aircraft had been factory equipped with protective armor, they remained within Taji’s airspace for the first several months. This restriction was not imposed from an excess of caution: between 20 January and 3 March, Iraqi insurgents had shot down or damaged eight US helicopters.65 As a result, it was not until 10 April that two Iraqi pilots made Squadron 2’s first flights outside Taji’s perimeter. Those sorties included live-fire exercises using externally mounted machine guns. Five more aircraft arrived at NAMAB on 2 May, and the final six were airlifted in from the United States on 29 July, by which time Squadron 2 had accumulated about 1,300 flying hours in training missions, passenger movement, and infrastructure protection and assessment."

The squadron wa listed by D.J. Elliott at Taji with Bell UH-1s in November 2009 and May 2010.

Scramble.nl does not list the squadron as operational in January 2019. The UH-1s may have been transferred to the army.
