= 115 Squadron =

115 Squadron or 115th Squadron may refer to:

- 115 Squadron (Israel)
- No. 115 Squadron RCAF, Canada
- No. 115 Squadron RAF, United Kingdom
- 115th Squadron (Iraq)
- 115th Airlift Squadron, United States Air Force
- VFA-115, United States Navy
- VAW-115, United States Navy
- VMFA-115, United States Marine Corps
