= 9th Squadron (Iraq) =

9th (Fighter) Squadron, Iraqi Air Force
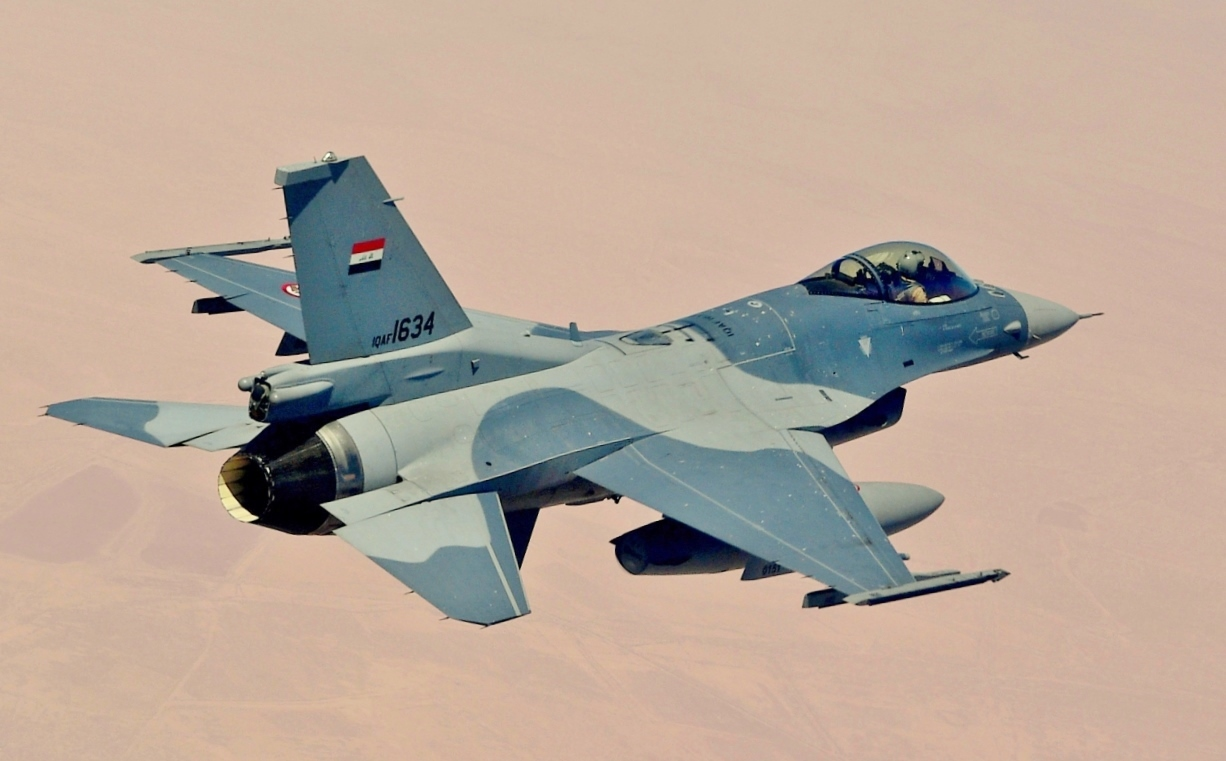
- An Iraqi Air Force F-16C. The 9th Squadron has operated the F-16 since it was recreated, in 2015.
- Active: 1961-1963; 1966-1995; 2015-present
- Country: Iraq
- Branch: Iraqi Air Force
- Role: Fighter
- Base: Balad Air Base

Insignia
- Fin Flash

Aircraft flown
- Fighter: F-16IQ

The 9th (Fighter) Squadron is a squadron of the Iraqi Air Force.

== First Iraqi Republic ==
No. 9 Squadron was established in 1959 with 16 Mikoyan-Gurevich MiG-19S aircraft and based at the Rasheed Air Base near Baghdad. The squadron was officially declared operational on 11 June 1961 and envisaged as a "flying praetorian guard" for regime of Prime Minister Abd al-Karim Qasim.

During the 8–10 February 1963 Ramadan Revolution, between four and six of its aircraft were destroyed on the ground by a pair of Hawker Hunters flown by pilots supporting the coup, while none of No. 9 Squadron's pilots managed to take off to confront the coup. Subsequently, most of the squadron's pilots were arrested, and the unit was grounded. Many of the remaining personnel fled to Jordan and Syria. The unit was then disbanded.

In 1966, No. 9 Squadron was recreated. As of June 1967, it was still working up on MiG-21FL/PFMs.

== Ba'athist Iraq ==
In 1973, the squadron was in the process of receiving MiG-21MFs. Midway through the conversion to the newer variant, with the outbreak of the Yom Kippur War on 6 October, all training stopped and the squadron's older MiG-21s were transferred to al-Wallid Air Base the next morning. By the afternoon of 7 October, the first 10 aircraft were forward deployed to Dmeyr and Tsaykal Air Bases, in Syria. Because the aircraft still were in aluminum finish, the Syrians took care to apply their own camouflage colours on them.

=== Yom Kippur War ===
The pilots quickly started flying combat air patrols, and had their first contacts with Israeli fighters less than an hour after their arrival. On 9 October, during a combat between two MiG-21s from No. 9 Squadron and four Israeli Dassault Mirage III over the Golan Heights, one of the Iraqi pilots hit a Mirage with two R-3S missiles. However, the other was shot down and killed. The next day, a pair of MiG-21s intercepted two Israeli McDonnell Douglas F-4 Phantom II, but they were targeted by several air-to-air missiles and had to disengage. On 12 October, MiG-21s from No. 9 Squadron escorted Iraqi Mikoyan-Gurevich MiG-17F that were attacking Israeli positions in the Quneitra area; while an Israeli Mirage was claimed shot down by No. 9 Squadron's commander, Major Namiq Sa'adallah, a MiG-17 was downed by the Mirages. On 13 October, a pair of MiG-21PFMs intercepted a formation of Douglas A-4 Skyhawks, and one was claimed shot down by two R-3S missiles. Later that day, a pair of MiG-21s acted as baits for a group of Israeli Mirages, one of which was shot down by surface-to-air missiles. On 23 October, Major Sa'adallah claimed a second Mirage shot down. Following the end of the war, all Iraqi units were withdrawn from Syria, including No. 9 Squadron.

In 1974, the squadron finally converted to MiG-21MFs. As of 1980, it was based at Firnas Air Base, near Mosul, with a detachment at Abu Ubayda Air Base.

Reportedly, in 2002, the 9th Squadron, and the 79th and 89th Squadrons, were respectively flying MiG-21s and Mirage F1EQs from Qayyarah Airfield West.

== Republic of Iraq ==
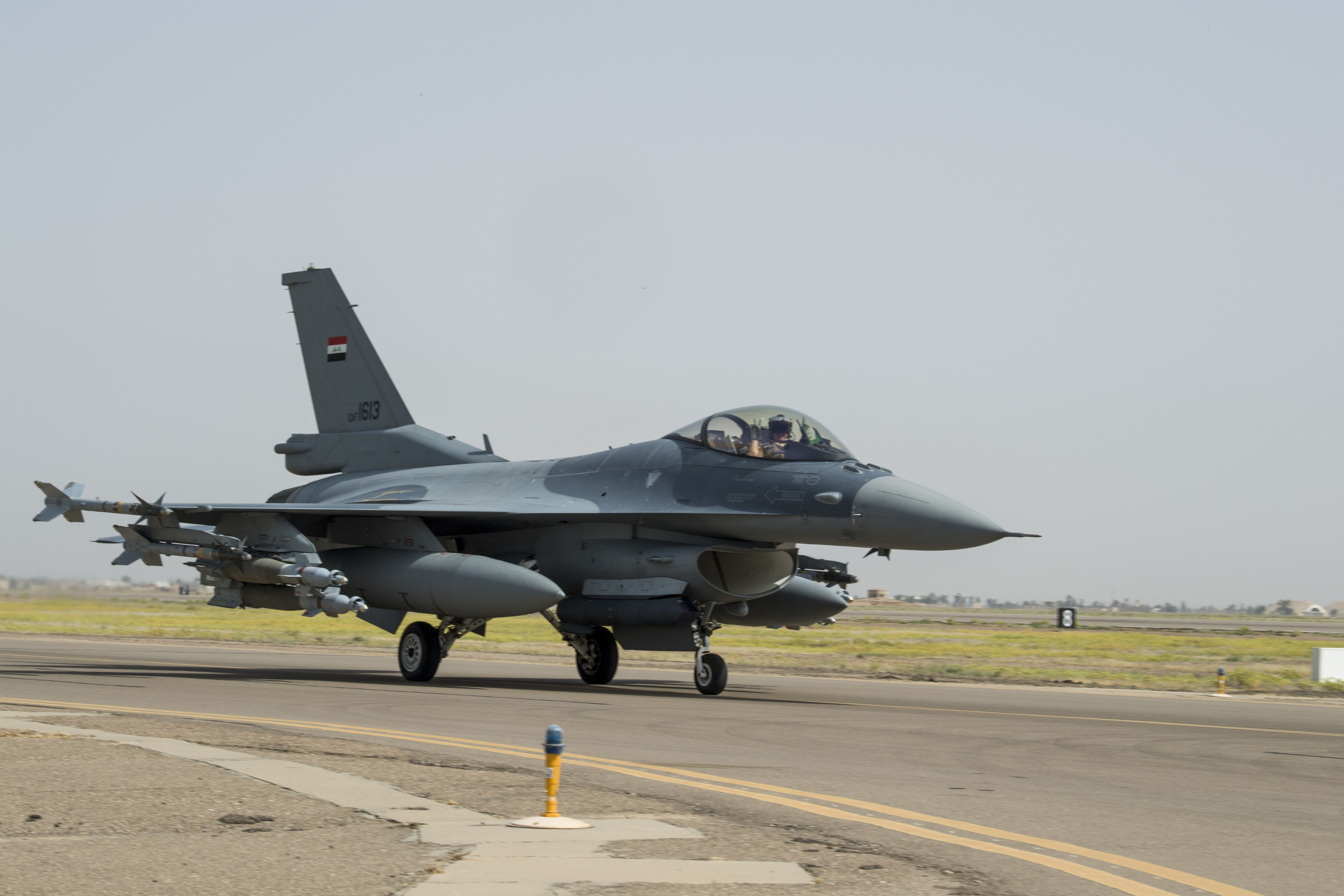
An Iraqi F-16C Fighting Falcon taxis on a flightline after conducting a coalition-led airstrike to attack ISIS in Syria, June 7th, 2018.

The squadron is now based at Balad Air Base and flies General Dynamics F-16IQ Fighting Falcons. 34 Iraqi F-16s operate in the country.
