= Iraqi Air Force =

Aerial warfare branch of Iraq's armed forces

- القوة الجوية العراقية; al-Qūwah al-jawwīyah al-ʻIrāqīyah
- Seal of the Iraqi Air Force
- Founded: 22 April 1931
- Country: Iraq
- Branch: Air force
- Role: Aerial warfare
- Size: Approximately 5,000 (2024) ca. 192 aircraft
- Part of: Iraqi Armed Forces
- Headquarters: Baghdad
- Colours: Grey & White
- Anniversaries: April 22 (Air Force Day)
- Engagements: Anglo-Iraqi War; 1948 Arab–Israeli War; Six-Day War; Yom Kippur War; 1974–75 Shatt al-Arab conflict; Iran–Iraq War; 22 September 1980 Iraqi airstrike on Iran; War of the Cities; USS Stark incident; Invasion of Kuwait; Gulf War; Operation Samurra; Operation Southern Watch; 1991 uprisings in Iraq; Iraqi no-fly zones; Iraq War; War against the Islamic State; Syrian Civil War; War in Iraq (2013–2017); Iraqi insurgency (2017–present)

Commanders
- Current commander: Lt. Gen. Khalid Mirdas al-Tamimi

Insignia
- Roundel; (1931–2004); (2019–present)

- Fin flash

- Flag

Aircraft flown
- Attack: Su-25, Aero L-159 ALCA, KAI T-50,
- Bomber: Antonov An-32
- Fighter: F-16 Fighting Falcon
- Helicopter: Mil Mi-17, Bell 212, Mil Mi-8, Eurocopter EC135, H225M Caracal
- Attack helicopter: Bell OH-58 Kiowa, Mil Mi-24, Mil Mi-28, Aérospatiale Gazelle
- Reconnaissance: CH 2000, Ce 208 ISR, KA 350 ISR, ScanEagle, Raven RQ-11B, CH-5
- Trainer: Cessna 172, Cessna 208, Aero L-39 Albatros, T-6A, Utva Lasta 95, Boeing 727, An-26
- Transport: C-130 Hercules, C-130J, An-32B, KA 350ER

The Iraqi Air Force (IQAF; Arabic: القوة الجوية العراقية, romanized: al-Qūwah al-jawwīyah al-ʻIrāqīyah) is the aerial warfare service branch of the Iraqi Armed Forces. It is responsible for the defense of Iraqi airspace as well as the policing of its international borders. The IQAF also acts as a support force for the Iraqi Navy and the Iraqi Army, which allows Iraq to rapidly deploy its military. It is headquartered in Baghdad. The current commander is Lt. Gen. Khalid Mirdas al-Tamimi.

The Iraqi Air Force was founded in 1931, during British control of Iraq after the Allies’ defeat of the Ottomans in the First World War. The Iraqi Air Force initially had only a few pilots. The Iraqi Air Force operated mostly British aircraft until the 14 July Revolution in 1958, when the new Iraqi government began increased diplomatic and military relationships with the Soviet Union. The air force used both Soviet and British aircraft throughout the 1950s and 1960s. When Saddam Hussein came to power in 1979, the air force increased in equipment when Iraq ordered more Soviet and French aircraft. The air force's peak size came after the long Iran–Iraq War, which ended in 1988, when it consisted of 1029 aircraft of all types, including 550 combat aircraft, becoming the largest air force in the region. A downsizing and weakening occurred during the Persian Gulf War (1990–91) while coalition forces enforced no-fly zones. International sanctions kept Sadam Hussein from buying additional aircraft or parts to repair existing aircraft. The Air Force was so weakened, that during the 2003 invasion, most were hidden in bunkers or buried in the desert sand. The remnants of Iraq's air force were destroyed during the 2003 U.S.-led invasion.

After the invasion, the IQAF was rebuilt, receiving most of its training and aircraft from the United States. In 2007, Iraq asked Iran to return some of the scores of Iraqi fighter planes that flew there to escape destruction during the Persian Gulf War in 1991. As of 2014, Iran was receptive to the demands and was working on refurbishing an unspecified number of jets.

== History ==
=== The first 10 years: 1931–1941 ===
The Iraqi Air Force considers its founding day as 22 April 1931. This day, the first Royal Iraqi Air Force (RIrAF) pilots returned to the country from training in the United Kingdom together with the air force's first aircraft: five de Havilland Gipsy Moths. These formed No. 1 Squadron, based at RAF Hinaidi. Before the creation of the new air force, the RAF Iraq Command was in charge of all British Armed Forces elements in Iraq in the 1920s and early 1930s. The RIrAF consisted of five pilots, aeronautics students trained at the RAF College Cranwell, and 32 aircraft mechanics. The original five pilots selected for aircraft training in 1929 were Natiq Mohammed Khalil al-Tay, Mohammed Ali Jawad, Hafdhi Aziz, Akrem Mushtaq, and Musa Ali. Later, Mahmud Salman and Atif Najib joined from the Army in 1931. The RIrAF saw its first aerial combat as early as October 1931, against Kurdish insurgents in the north of the country. It was during operations against the Kurds that the air force suffered its first combat loss, when a DH.60 collided with a mountain near Barzan in April 1932, killing both crew members. That year, the Gipsy Moths were reinforced by three more DH.60Ts and three de Havilland Puss Moths. The next year, eight de Havilland Dragons were delivered, and in 1934, the first out of a total of 34 Hawker Audaxes (named Nisr in Iraqi service) were acquired.

In the years following Iraqi independence, the Air Force was still dependent on the Royal Air Force. The Iraqi government allocated the majority of its military expenditure to the Iraqi Army and by 1936 the Royal Iraqi Air Force had only 37 pilots and 55 aircraft. The following year, the Air Force showed some growth, increasing its number of pilots to 127. This enabled it to purchase additional aircraft. In 1937, following high-level visits in Italy and Great Britain, Iraq placed orders for 4 Savoia-Marchetti SM.79s, 25 Breda Ba.65s, and 15 Gloster Gladiators. In 1939, 15 Northrop 8As were bought.

The RIrAF's first combat against another conventional military was in the 1941 Anglo-Iraqi War, when the Iraqi government made a bid for full independence following a coup by Rashid Ali against pro-British Iraqi leaders. The war began in earnest on 2 May, when British aircraft started attacking the Iraqi troops that were encircling RAF Habbaniya. In response, the RIrAF started attacking the airfield, destroying two Hawker Audaxes and one Airspeed Oxford on the ground that day. On 4 May, eight Vickers Wellington and two Bristol Blenheim bombers of the RAF attacked Rasheed Air Base, the RIrAF's main airfield. However, most Iraqi aircraft had been redeployed to Al-Washash and Baqubah. During the raid, a Wellington that had been hit by anti-aircraft fire was attacked by an Iraqi Gloster Gladiator, and was damaged to the point where it had to make an emergency lading outside Baghdad. This represented the first aerial victory for the RIrAF. However, on the same day an SM.79 was shot down by Iraqi ground fire over the airfield at Al Diwaniyah. The RAF kept attacking Iraqi airfields; on 8 May, it claimed to have destroyed six aircraft on the ground at Baqubah, and shot down one Gladiator. Around 15 May, Luftwaffe aircraft painted in Iraqi markings arrived in Iraq to help in the fight against the British. However, the latter were meanwhile sending ever more reinforcements to Iraq, and support from the Axis powers could not change the course of the war. Losses and a lack of spares and replacement aircraft resulted in the Germans' departure at the end of May. On 31 May, a ceasefire was signed, thus ending the war.

=== Reconstruction and growth: 1941–1967 ===
The Anglo-Iraqi War left the RIrAF shattered. Several squadrons had all of their aircraft destroyed, while many officers and pilots had been killed or had fled to neighbouring countries. Due to the destruction of the Flying School's entire aircraft inventory, training of new pilots only restarted six years after the war. Flying hours were also limited by the British authorities, which confiscated three of the remaining Gloster Gladiators in March 1942. Despite Iraqi attempts to buy some new aircraft, the only ones the British were ready to provide were some worn-out Gladiators: although 30 were delivered between September 1942 and May 1944, most of them were in such a state that they could only be used as sources of spare parts. From 1944 to 1947, 33 Avro Ansons were acquired. Despite these hurdles, the RIrAF helped put down the 1943 Barzani revolt. In late 1946, the Iraqis reached an agreement with the British, under which they would return their surviving Avro Ansons, in exchange for the authorisation to order 30 Hawker Fury F.Mk.1 fighters and two Fury T.Mk.52 two-seat trainers. The next year, three de Havilland Doves and three Bristol Freighters were ordered.

The RIrAF was still recovering from its destruction during the Anglo-Iraqi War when it joined in the war against the newly created state of Israel in the 1948 Arab–Israeli War. The air force only played a small role in the first war against Israel. From 1948 to 1949 No. 7 Squadron operated Avro Anson training bombers from Transjordan from where they flew several attacks against the Israelis. After a series of attacks on Arab capitals, flown by three Boeing B-17s that had been pressed into service by the Israeli Air Force, the governments of Transjordan and Syria demanded that the Iraqis replace their Ansons with Hawker Furies. However, only six Furies were sent to Damascus, and they never encountered any Israeli aircraft. Moreover, due to the limited amount of cannon ammunition supplied by the British, and the absence of bombs, they were only used for armed reconnaissance. In the end, the four surviving aircraft were handed over to Egypt in October 1948. Despite these early problems, in 1951 the RIrAF purchased 20 more Fury F.Mk.1s, for a total of 50 F.Mk.1s single-seaters and 2 two-seaters, which equipped No. 1, No. 4 and No. 7 Squadrons.

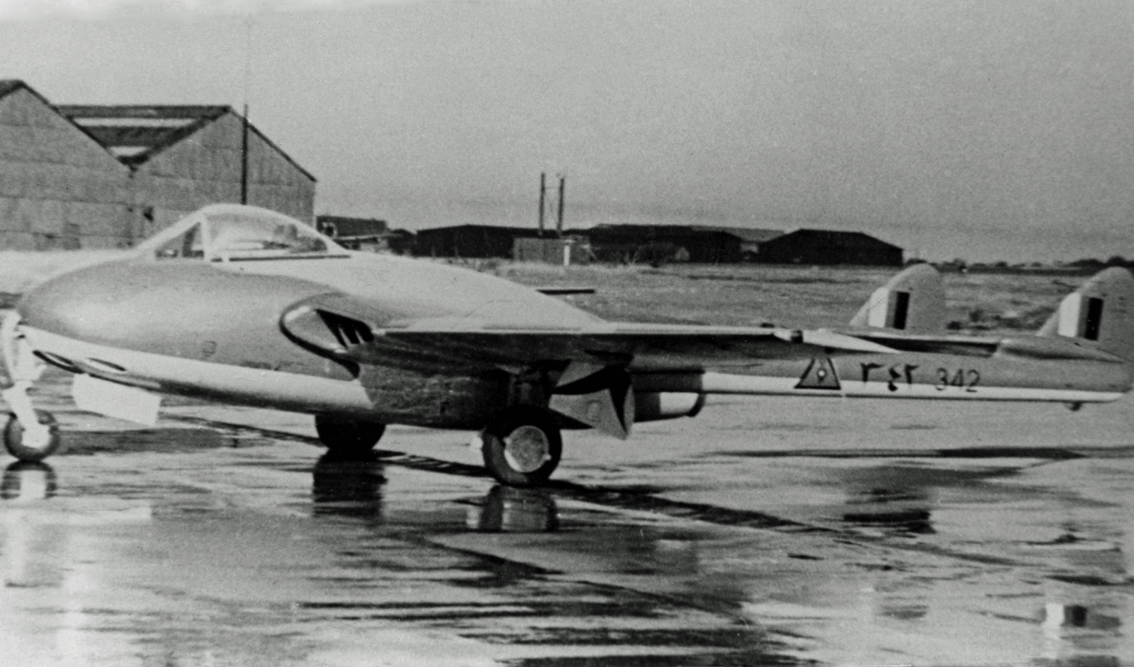
An Iraqi Air Force De Havilland Vampire FB.52, before delivery in 1953

In the early 1950s, thanks to increased income from oil and agricultural exports, the RIrAF was thoroughly re-equipped. In 1951, 15 each of de Havilland Canada DHC-1 Chipmunks, Percival Provosts and North American T-6s were bought to replace obsolete de Havilland Tiger Moth trainers. With these new aircraft, the RIrAF Flying School was expanded into the Air Force College. The training curriculum was improved, and the number of students graduating each year was increased. This allowed to form a solid basis for the RIrAF's long-term growth. Also in 1951, the RIrAF bought its first helicopters: three Westland Dragonflies. The RIrAF's first jet fighter was the de Havilland Vampire: 12 FB.Mk.52 fighters and 10 T.Mk.55 trainers were delivered from 1953 to 1955. These were quickly supplemented by 20 de Havilland Venoms, delivered between 1954 and 1956. Following the formation of the Baghdad Pact, the United States donated at least six Cessna O-1 Bird Dogs to the RIrAF. The RAF also vacated Shaibah Air Base, and the RIrAF took over it as Wahda Air Base. In 1957, six Hawker Hunter F.Mk.6s were delivered. The next year, the United States agreed to provide 36 F-86F Sabres free of charge.

However, this plan was never realised. Following the 14 July Revolution of 1958, which resulted in the end of monarchy in Iraq, the influence of the Iraqi Communist Party grew significantly. The first commander of the Iraqi Air Force (the "Royal" prefix was dropped after the revolution), Jalal Jaffar al-Awqati, was an outspoken communist, and encouraged prime minister Abd al-Karim Qasim to improve relations between Iraq and the USSR. The Soviets reacted quickly, and in the autumn of 1958 a series of arms contracts was passed between Iraq and the Soviet Union and Czechoslovakia. These stipulated the delivery of MiG-15UTI trainers, MiG-17F fighters, Ilyushin Il-28 bombers, and Antonov An-2 and An-12 transports. The first aircraft arrived in Iraq in January 1959. During the late 1960s and or early 1970s additional MiG-17s may have been purchased and then forwarded to either Syria or Egypt.

Tom Cooper and Stefan Kuhn list the air force's squadrons in 1961 as:

- 1st Squadron, Venom FB.Mk.1, based at Habbaniyah AB, CO Capt. A.-Mun'em Ismaeel
- 2nd Squadron (Iraq), Mi-4, based at Rashid AB, CO Maj. Wahiq Ibraheem Adham
- 3rd Squadron (Iraq), An-12B, based at Rashid AB, CO Capt. Taha Ahmad Mohammad Rashid
- 4th Squadron (Iraq), Fury I, based at Kirkuk Air Base, CO Maj. A. Latif
- 5th Squadron (Iraq), MiG-17F, based at Rashid AB, CO Maj. Khalid Sarah Rashid
- 6th Squadron, Hunter FGA.59/A/B, based at Habbaniyah AB, CO Capt. Hamid Shaban
- 7th Squadron, Mikoyan-Gurevich MiG-17F, based at Kirkuk, CO Maj. Ne'ma Abdullah Dulaimy
- 8th Squadron, Il-28, based at Rasheed Air Base, CO Maj. Adnan Ameen Rashid
- 9th Squadron, MiG-19S, in process of formation.

The IrAF received approximately 30 MiG-19Ss, 10 MiG-19Ps, and 10 MiG-19PMs in 1959 and 1960. However, only 16 MiG-19Ss were ever taken up; the other aircraft were not accepted due to their poor technical condition, and remained stored in Basra. The accepted MiG-19Ss were operated from Rasheed Air Base by the 9th Squadron. Their service in Iraq did not last long however: the survivors were donated to Egypt around 1964. Iraq also received MiG-21F-13 and Tupolev Tu-16 bombers starting in 1962.

The November 1963 Iraqi coup d'état realigned Iraq with NATO powers, and as a result, more second-hand Hawker Hunters were delivered to the IQAF. Aircraft imports from the Communist Eastern European nations had been suspended until 1966, when MiG-21PF interceptors were purchased from the Soviet Union.

In 1966, Iraqi Captain Munir Redfa defected with his MiG-21F-13 to Israel which in turn gave it to the United States for evaluation under the code-name "Have Donut".

=== Six-Day War ===
During the Six-Day War, the IQAF bombed several air bases and land targets. On 6 June 1967, a group of four Tupolev Tu-16 bombers was sent to attack Ramat David Airbase. Two of them had to abort due to technical difficulties, and another was shot down by Israelis, killing the crew of five. The IQAF also played a significant role in supporting Jordanian troops. The Iraqi Air Force had one Pakistani pilot, Saiful Azam, who claimed two kills against Israeli aircraft over the H-3 air base in a Hawker Hunter. Iraqi Hunter pilots were officially credited for shooting down a further four Israeli aircraft, and another one was credited to anti-aircraft guns. Thanks to its Hunters and MiG-21s, the IQAF was successfully able to defend its bases in western Iraq from additional Israeli attacks.

=== Peak operations (1970s — 1980s) ===
Throughout this decade, the IQAF grew in size and capability, as the 20 year Treaty of friendship with the USSR signed in 1971 brought large numbers of relatively modern fighter aircraft to the air force. The Iraqi government was never satisfied with the Soviets alone supplying them, and while they were purchasing modern fighters like the MiG-21 and the Sukhoi Su-20, they began persuading the French to sell Mirage F1s fighters (which were bought) and later Jaguars (which were however never ordered).

Before the Yom Kippur War, the IQAF sent 12 Hawker Hunters to Egypt where they stayed to fight; only 1 survived the war. The IQAF first received their Sukhoi Su-7s in 1968; they were originally stationed in Syria. Aircraft deployed to Syria suffered heavy losses due to Israeli aircraft and SAMs. In addition, they were hit with friendly fire from Syrian SAMs. A planned attack on 8 October was canceled due to these heavy losses as well as disagreements with the Syrian government. Eventually, all aircraft besides several Sukhoi Su-7s were withdrawn from bases in Syria. During the war in October 1973, the first air strike against Israeli bases in Sinai was composed of Iraqi planes; they hit artillery sites and Israeli tanks, and they also claimed to have destroyed 21 Israeli fighters in air combat. Shortly after the war, the IQAF ordered 14 Tupolev Tu-22Bs and two Tu-22Us from the USSR as well as Raduga Kh-22 missiles and by 1975, 10 Tu-22Bs and 2 Tu-22Us were delivered.

The 1970s also saw a series of fierce Kurdish uprisings in the north of the country against Iraq. With the help of the Shah of Iran, the Kurds received arms and supplies including modern SAMs as well as some Iranian soldiers. The IQAF suffered heavy casualties fighting the Kurds, so they began using their new Tu-22s in combat against them (using 3 tonne bombs from high altitude to avoid the Iranian HAWK SAM batteries that the Shah had set up near the Iraqi border to cover the Kurdish insurgents) as they were able to avoid a greater percentage of SAMs due to their higher bombing altitude and improved electronic countermeasures. During the mid-1970s, tensions with Iran were high but were later resolved with the Algiers Treaty.

=== 1980s and war with Iran ===
In the early 1980s, a large-scale national effort was launched to develop the country's existing airfields. From June 1980 through February 1983, 21 new airfields were built, while 19 operational airfields were refurbished. These upgrades included runway resurfacing, installation of high-speed approaches and extensive dispersal sites with hardstands/aircraft shelters. The effort was aimed at increasing the deployment flexibility of the IQAF. During the onset of the Iran–Iraq War, airfields in the east were able to launch offensive sorties into Iran and defend eastern oil fields and military installations. Four airfields were also built in the southern regions and another four in the western regions.

Between the autumn of 1980 and the summer of 1990, the number of aircraft in the IQAF went from 332 to over 1000. Before the Iraqi invasion of Iran, the IQAF had expected 16 modern Dassault Mirage F.1EQs from France and were also in the middle of receiving a total of 240 new aircraft and helicopters from their Eastern European allies. When Iraq invaded Iran in late September 1980, the Soviets and the French stopped delivering additional aircraft to Iraq but resumed deliveries a few months later.

The IQAF had to instead fight with obsolete Su-20, MiG-21 Fishbeds and MiG-23 Floggers. The MiG-21 was the main interceptor of the force while their MiG-23s were used for ground attack and interception. The Su-20 were pure ground attack aircraft. On the first day of the war, formations of Tu-16/22s, Su-20s, MiG-23s and MiG-21s, for a total of 166–192 aircraft, performed surprise airstrikes on 10 airbases of the Iranian Air Force, succeeding in destroying a large of number of fighter-bomber aircraft on the ground, but not enough to knock the Iranian Air Force out. In retaliation for these aerial strikes, the Iranian Air Force launched Operation Kaman 99 a day after the war was launched.

During late 1981, it was soon clear that the modern Mirage F1s and the Soviet MiG-25s were effective against the Iranians. The IQAF began to use their new Eastern weaponry which included Tu-22KD/KDP bombers, equipped with Kh-22M/MP air-to-ground missiles, MiG-25s equipped with Kh-23 air-to-ground missiles as well as Kh-25 and Kh-58 anti-radar missiles and also MiG-23BNs, equipped with Kh-29L/T missiles. In 1983, to satisfy the Iraqis waiting for their upgraded Exocet-capable Mirage F1EQ-5s, Super Etendards were leased to Iraq. The Iranian oil tanker fleet (see Tanker War) and gunboats suffered severe damage at the hands of the 5 Super Etendards equipped with Exocet anti-ship missiles. One of these was lost during their 20-month combat use and 4 returned to the Aeronavale in 1985.

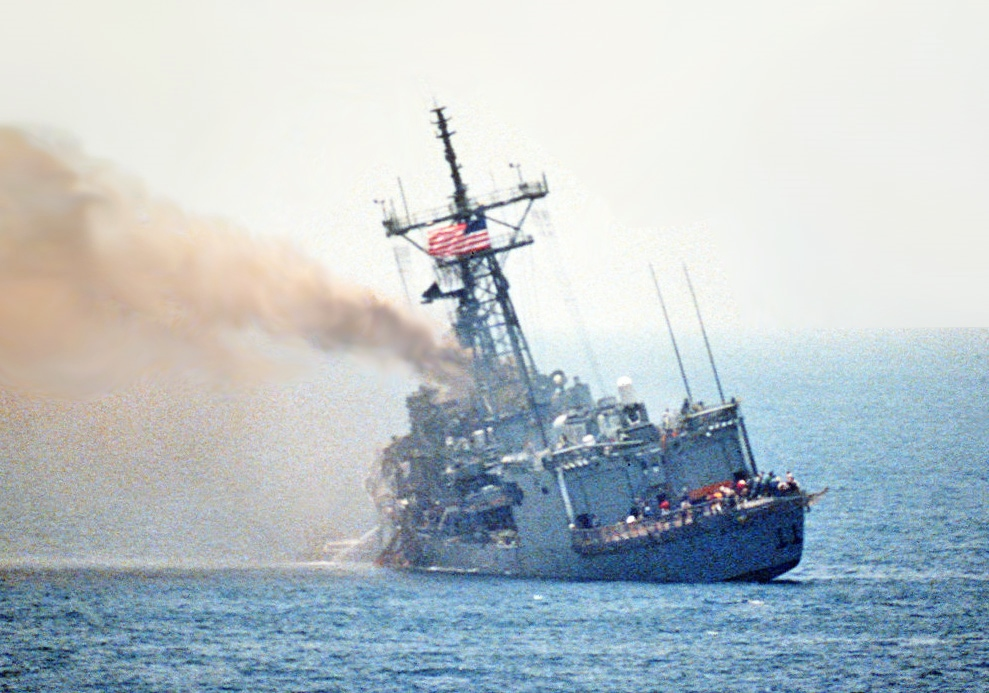
USS Stark listing following two hits by Iraqi Exocet missiles

The IQAF generally played a major role in the war against Iran by striking airbases, military infrastructure, industrial infrastructure such as factories, powerplants and oil facilities, as well as systematically bombing urban areas in Tehran and other major Iranian cities (later came to be known as the War of the Cities). At the end of the war, in conjunction with the Army and special operations forces, the IQAF played a significant role in routing Iran's last military offensive. (by that time, the role of the once superior Iranian Air Force had been reduced to missions in desperate situations only, performing critical tasks such as defending Iran's vital oil terminals). The air force also had a successful role attacking tankers and other vessels going to and from Iran, by using Exocet missiles on their Mirage F1s. On May 17, 1987, an Iraqi F1 mistakenly launched two Exocet anti-ship missiles into the American frigate USS Stark, crippling the vessel and killing 37 sailors.

Between 1986 and 1987, the IQAF was reorganised and retrained. By 1987 the Iraqi Air Force had a large modern military infrastructure, with modern air logistics centers, air depots, maintenance and repair facilities, and some production capabilities. By that time the air force consisted of 40,000 men, of whom about 10,000 were a part of the Air Defense Command. Its main bases were in Tammuz (Al Taqqadum), Al Bakr (Balad), Al Qadisiya (Al Asad), Ali Air Base, Saddam Airbase (Qayarrah West Air Base) and other major bases including Basra. The IQAF operated from 24 main operating bases and 30 dispersal bases, with 600 aircraft shelters including nuclear-hardened shelters, with multiple taxiways to multiple runways. Iraq also had 123 smaller airfields of various kinds (reserve fields and helicopter fields).

However, following the end of the war, Hussein began expelling many of the IQAF's officers, including ranks between captains and colonels in fear of involvement during coup attempt. Many of whom were likely executed or imprisoned, including pilots with a high level and status. Subsequently, the Air Force was internally weakened, losing many of its skilled pilots who gained experienced from the prior war with Iran.

==== Notable Iraqi pilots of the Iran–Iraq War ====
Unlike many nations with modern air forces, Iraq engaged in an eight-year war with Iran (1980–1988), during which the Iraqi Air Force gained extensive combat experience. Although documentation on the service is limited, two pilots are widely cited as Iraq's top-scoring fighter aces

Mohammed Rayyan, nicknamed "Sky Falcon," who flew MiG-21MF in 1980–81, and claimed two confirmed kills against Iranian F-5Es in 1980. With the rank of Captain, Rayyan qualified on MiG-25P in late 1981 and went on to claim another eight kills, two of which are confirmed, before being shot down and killed by IRIAF F-14s in 1986.

Captain Omar Goben was another successful pilot. While flying a MiG-21 he scored air kills against two F-5E Tiger IIs and one F-4E Phantom II in 1980. He later transferred to the MiG-23 and survived the war, but was killed in January 1991 flying a MiG-29 versus an American F-15C.

Captain Salah I. was also a distinguished pilot during this period flying a Mirage F1, achieving a double kill against two F-4Es on 2 December 1981 while he was part of the 79th Squadron.

=== 1990s – Persian Gulf War and no-fly zones ===
In August 1990, Iraq had the largest air force in the region even after the long Iran–Iraq War. The air force at that time had 934 combat-capable aircraft (including trainers) in its inventory. Theoretically, the IQAF should have been 'hardened' by the conflict with Iran, but post-war purges of the IQAF leadership and other personnel decimated the air force, as the Iraqi regime struggled to bring it back under total control. Training was brought to a minimum during the whole of 1990.

The table below shows the Iraqi Air Force at the start of the Persian Gulf War, its losses, damaged aircraft, flights to Iran and remaining assets at the end of the Persian Gulf War. A portion of the aircraft damaged may have been repairable or else used for spare parts. This is a combination of losses both in the air (23–36 aircraft) and on the ground (227 aircraft) and exclude the helicopters and aircraft that belonged to Iraqi Army Aviation, Iraqi Navy and the Aviation wing of the Iraqi Department of Border Enforcement.

Iraqi losses, flights to Iran and remaining aircraft after war.
Aircraft	1990	destroyed	damaged	to Iran	survived
Mirage F1EQ/BQ	108	23	6	24	43
Mirage F1K (Kuwaiti)	8	2	2	0	4
Su-7BMK	54				
Su-20	18	4	2	4	8
Su-22R	10	1	0	0	9
Su-22M2	24	2	6	5	11
Su-22M3	16	7	0	9	0
Su-22UM3/UM3K	8	3	1	0	4
Su-22M4	28	7	0	15	6
Su-24MK	30	5	0	24	1
Su-25K/UBK	72	31	8	7	26
MiG-19C/Shenyang J-6	45				
MiG-21MF/bis/F-7B/M	236	65	46	0	115
MiG-23BN	38	17	0	4	18
MiG-23ML	39	14	1	7	17
MiG-23MF	14	2	5	0	7
MiG-23MS	15	2	4	0	9
MiG-23UM	21	8	0	1	12
MiG-25U	7	3	2	0	2
MiG-25RB	9	3	3	0	3
MiG-25PD/PDS/PU/R	19	13	1	0	5
MiG-29B	42	17	4	3	18
MiG-29UB	8	0	0	1	7
Tu-16/KSR-2-11	3	3	0	0	0
Tu-22B/U	4	4	0	0	0
Xian H-6D	4	4	0	0	0
An-26	5	0	3	0	2
Ilyushin Il-76	19	3	1	15	0
Dassault Falcon 20	2	0	0	2	0
Dassault Falcon 50	3	0	0	3	0
Lockheed Jetstar	6	4	0	1	1
Aero L-39 Albatros	67	0	1	0	66
Embraer Tucano	78	1	6	0	64
FFA AS-202 Bravo	34	5	5	0	17
Eloris trainer	12	0	0	0	12
BAC Jet Provost	20	5	0	0	15
MBB/Kawasaki BK 117	14	1	6	0	6

During the 1991 Persian Gulf War, the Iraqi Air Force was devastated by coalition airpower, notably the aerial forces of the United States, the United Kingdom and their allies. Most airfields were heavily struck, and in air combat Iraq was only able to obtain four confirmed kills (and four damaged along with one probable kill), while sustaining 23 losses. All of the out of service (six) Tupolev Tu-22s that Iraq possessed were destroyed by bombing at the start of Operation Desert Storm. However, they had already been withdrawn from the inventory of the Iraqi Air Force and were simply used as decoys and do not appear on the operational list of lost aircraft from the Iraqi Air Force (like all other old aircraft which were used solely to deflect raids from operational assets).

The MiG-25 force (NATO reporting name 'Foxbat') recorded the first air-to-air kill during the war. A MIG-25PDS, piloted by Lt. Zuhair Dawood of the 84th Fighter Squadron, shot down a U.S. Navy F/A-18 Hornet from VFA-81 on the first night of the war. In 2009 the Pentagon announced they had identified the remains of the pilot, U.S. Navy Captain Michael "Scott" Speicher, solving an 18-year mystery. Captain Speicher, who was a Lieutenant Commander at the time, was apparently buried by nomadic Bedouin tribesmen close to where his jet was shot down in a remote area of Anbar province.

The second air-air kill was recorded by a pilot named Jameel Sayhood on January nineteenth. Flying a MIG-29, he shot down a Royal Air Force Tornado GR.1A with R-60 missiles. Flight Lieutenant D J Waddington piloted the RAF aircraft serial ZA396/GE, and Flight Lieutenant R J Stewart, and crashed 51 nautical miles southeast of Tallil air base.

On 30 January 1991, an IQAF MiG-25 hit and damaged a USAF F-15C with an R-40 missile in the Samurra Air Battle. Iraq claims it was shot down (pilot ejected) and subsequently the aircraft crashed in Saudi Arabia.

An Iraqi Mirage F-1 piloted by Capt. Nafie Al-Jubouri successfully downed an American EF-111 Raven through aerial maneuvering as it crashed while attempting to avoid a missile fired by Al-Jubouri.

In another incident, an Iraqi MiG-25 eluded eight USAF F-15C Eagles, firing three missiles at a USAF EF-111 electronic warfare aircraft, forcing them to abort their mission. In yet another incident, two MiG-25's approached a pair of F-15 Eagles, fired missiles (which were evaded by the F-15s), and then out-ran the American fighters. Two more F-15s joined the pursuit, and a total of ten air-to-air missiles were fired at the Iraqi aircraft; none of which could reach them.

In an effort to demonstrate their own air offensive capability, on 24 January the Iraqis attempted to mount a strike against the major Saudi oil refinery in Abqaiq. Two Mirage F-1 fighters laden with incendiary bombs and two MiG-23s (along as fighter cover) took off. They were spotted by USAF Boeing E-3 Sentry AWACS aircraft, and two Royal Saudi Air Force F-15s were sent to intercept. When the Saudis appeared the Iraqi MiGs turned tail, but the Mirages pressed on. Captain Ayedh Al-Shamrani, one of the Saudi pilots, maneuvered his jet behind the Mirages and shot down both aircraft. After this episode, the Iraqis made no more air efforts of their own, sending most of their jets to Iran in hopes that they might someday get their Air Force back. (Iran returned seven Su-25s in 2014.)

During the Persian Gulf War, most Iraqi pilots and aircraft (of French and Soviet origin) fled to Iran to escape the bombing campaign because no other country would allow them sanctuary. The Iranians impounded these aircraft after the war and returned seven Su-25s in 2014, while putting the rest in the service of the Islamic Republic of Iran Air Force – claiming them as reparations for the Iran–Iraq War. Because of this Saddam Hussein did not send the rest of his Air Force to Iran just prior to Operation Iraqi Freedom in 2003, instead opting to bury them in sand. Saddam Hussein, preoccupied with Iran and regional power balance, is reported to have commented: "The Iranians are even stronger than before, they now have our Air Force."

These included: Mirage F1s EQ1/2/4/5/6, Su-20 and Su-22M2/3/4 Fitters, Su-24MK Fencer-Ds, Su-25K/UBK Frogfoots, MiG-23ML Floggers, MiG-29A/UB (product 9.12B) Fulcrums and a number of Il-76s, including the one-off AEW-AWACS prototype Il-76 "ADNAN 1". Also, prior to Operation Desert Storm, 19 Iraqi Mig-21s and MiG-23s were sent to Yugoslavia for servicing, but were never returned due to international sanctions. In 2009, the Iraqi government briefly sought the return of the fighters, but they were disassembled and would have been costly to repair and return.

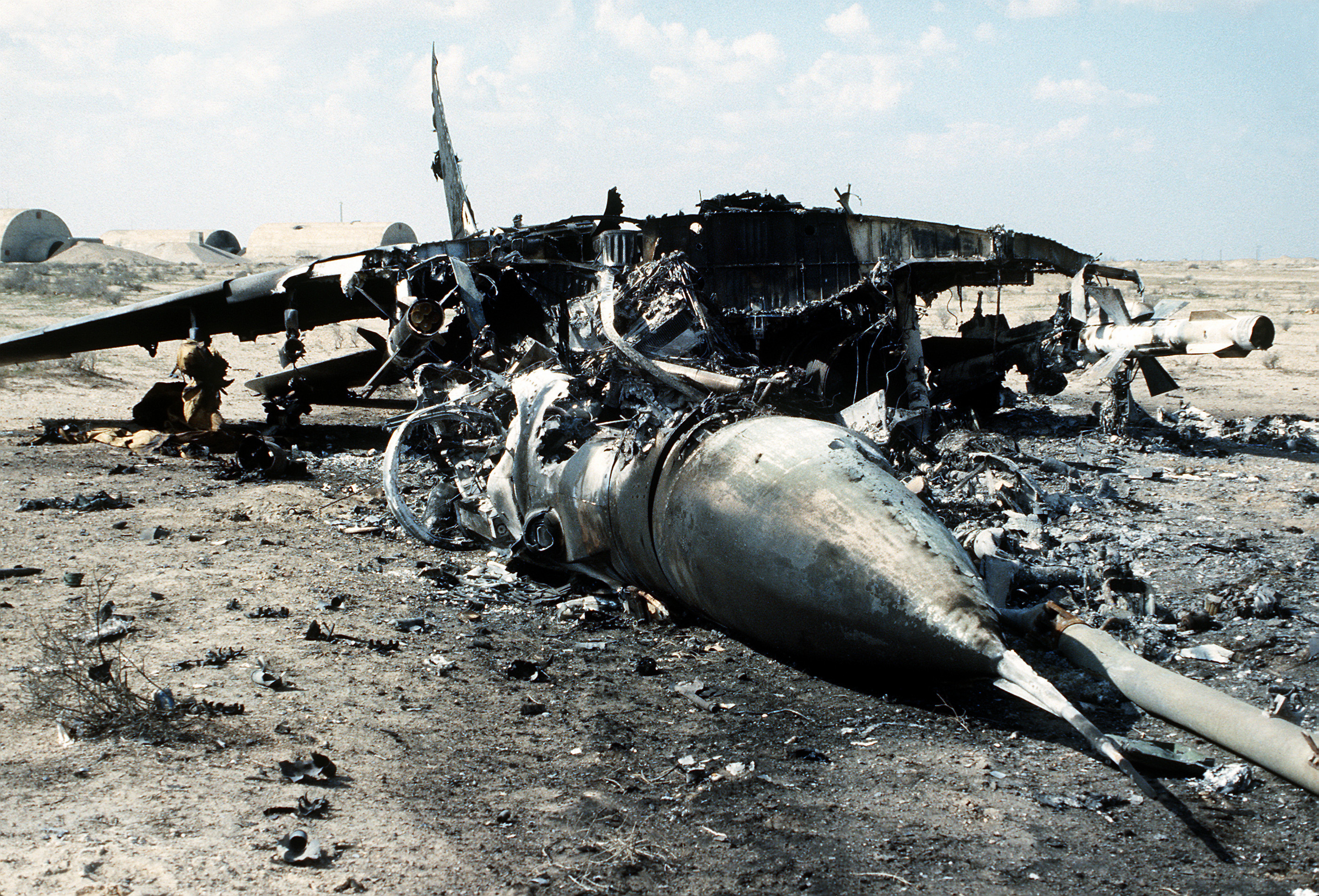
An Iraqi MiG-29 aircraft lies in ruins after it was destroyed by coalition forces during the Persian Gulf War's Operation Desert Storm.

==== Persian Gulf War aircraft losses by coalition forces ====
Aircraft	Origin	No. Shot Down	No. To Iran
MiG-21	Soviet Union	4	0
MiG-23	Soviet Union	9	12
MiG-25	Soviet Union	2	0
MiG-29	Soviet Union	6	4
Su-7	Soviet Union	4	
Su-17	Soviet Union	4	
Su-20	Soviet Union	0	4
Su-22	Soviet Union	2	40
Su-24	Soviet Union	0	24
Su-25	Soviet Union	2	7
Ilyushin Il-76	Soviet Union	1	15
Mil Mi-8	Soviet Union	1	0
Mirage F-1	France	9	24
Total Number Loss		36	137

The Iraqi Air Force itself lists its air-to-air losses at 23 airframes compared to the US claims of 44. Similarly, the Allies initially acknowledged no losses in air combat to the Iraqi Air Force, and only in 1995 acknowledged one loss. After 2003 the Allies acknowledged a second loss, but a further two Iraqi claims and one probable are still listed by the Allies as lost to "ground fire" rather than an Iraqi fighter. Generally at least three Iraqi pilots are relatively agreed upon to have scored victories against coalition aircraft in aerial combat.

As well as the Persian Gulf war, the IQAF was also involved in the 1991 uprisings in Iraq. Alongside Army aviation, Mi-8, Mi-24, Gazelle, Alouette and Puma helicopters were used to counter the attempted Shi'ite and Kurdish revolts between 1991 and 1993.

After the Persian Gulf War, the Iraqi Air Force consisted only of a sole Su-24 (nicknamed "waheeda" in the Iraqi Air Force which translates to roughly "the lonely") and a single squadron of MiG-25s purchased from the Soviet Union in 1979. Some Mirages, MiG-23MLs and SU-22s also remained in use, with the MiG-29s being withdrawn from use by 1995 due to engine TBO limits, and the MiG-21s withdrawn due to obsolescence. During the period of sanctions that followed, the Iraqi Air Force was severely restricted by no-fly zones established by the coalition and by restricted access to spare parts due to United Nations sanctions. Many aircraft were unserviceable and a few were hidden from American reconnaissance to escape potential destruction. In patrols of the no-fly zones, three Iraqi MiGs were lost. Despite several attacks from U.S. F-15s and F-14s firing AIM-54 and AIM-120 missiles at the Iraqi fighters, the Iraqi maneuvers ensured they were able to avoid any casualties in their dispute over Iraqi airspace. The last recorded air-to-air kill was on 23 December 2002, when a MiG-25 Foxbat shot down an armed American RQ-1 Predator.

In 2008, the Defense Technical Information Center released the top-secret archives of the Saddam-era Iraqi Air Force, shedding light on the true losses and operations of the Air Force during 1991.

==== Inventory in the 1991 Persian Gulf War ====
Aircraft	Image	Origin	Type	Variant	In service	Notes
Combat aircraft
Mirage F1		France	Fighter	Mirage F1EQ/BQ	108	
Sukhoi Su-20		Soviet Union	Ground attack		18	
Sukhoi Su-22		Soviet Union	Ground attack	Su-22R/Su-22M2/M3/M4	133	
Sukhoi Su-24		Soviet Union	Interdiction/Strike	Su-24MK	30	
Sukhoi Su-25		Soviet Union	Ground attack	Su-25K/UBK	72	
MiG-21		Soviet Union/China	Fighter	MiG-21MF/bis/F-7B	236	
MiG-23		Soviet Union	Ground attack	MiG-23BN	38	
MiG-23		Soviet Union	Fighter	MiG-23MS/MF	29	
MiG-23		Soviet Union	Fighter	MiG-23ML	39	
MiG-25		Soviet Union	Interceptor	MiG-25PD/PDS/PU/R/RB	35	
MiG-29		Soviet Union	Fighter	MiG-29B/MiG-29UB	50	
Tupolev Tu-16		Soviet Union	Strategic bomber	Tu-16/KSR-2-11	3	
Tupolev Tu-22		Soviet Union	Strategic bomber	Tu-22B/U	4	
Xian H-6		China	Strategic bomber	Xian H-6D	4	
Ilyushin Il-28		Soviet Union	Medium bomber	Il-28/U/BM	16	
BAC Jet Provost		United Kingdom	Attack		20	
AEW&CA
Ilyushin Il-76MD		Soviet Union/Iraq	Airborne early warning and control aircraft	Baghdad 1 Adnan-1; Adnan-2	3	
Transport
Antonov An-26		Soviet Union	Transport		5	
Ilyushin Il-76		Soviet Union	Cargo		19	
Dassault Falcon 20		France	VIP Transport		2	
Dassault Falcon 50		France	VIP Transport		3	
Lockheed Jetstar		USA	VIP Transport		1	
Trainers
Aero L-39 Albatros		Czechoslovakia	Trainer/COIN	L-39C/L-39ZO	81	
Embraer Tucano		Brazil	Trainer/COIN	EMB-312	80	
FFA AS-202 Bravo		Switzerland	Trainer		48	

=== 2003 US-led invasion of Iraq ===
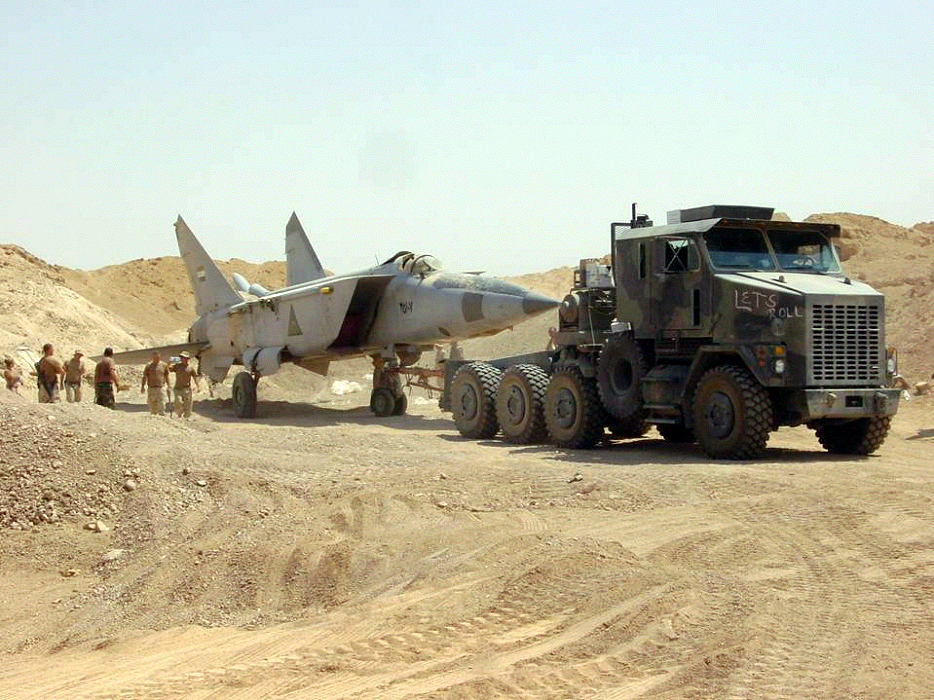
An Iraqi MiG-25 Foxbat found buried under the sand west of Baghdad.

By early 2003, Iraq's air power numbered an estimated 300 combat aircraft, of which only about half were flyable. In late 2002, a Yugoslav weapons company provided servicing for the MiG-21s and MiG-23s, violating UN sanctions. An aviation institute in Bijeljina, Bosnia and Herzegovina, supplied the engines and spare parts. These however, were too late to improve the condition of Iraq's air force.

On the brink of the US-led invasion, Saddam Hussein disregarded his air force's wishes to defend the country's airspace against coalition aircraft and ordered the bulk of his fighters to be disassembled and buried. Some were later found by US excavation forces around the Al Taqqadum and Al Asad air bases, including MiG-25s and Su-25s. The IQAF proved to be totally non-existent during the invasion; a few helicopters were seen but no fighters flew to combat coalition aircraft.

During the occupation phase, most of Iraq's combat aircraft (J-7, MiG-23s, MiG-25s, SU-20/22, Su-25 and some MiG-29s) were found by American and Australian forces in poor condition at several air bases throughout the country while others were discovered buried. Most of the IQAF's aircraft were destroyed during and after the invasion, and all remaining equipment was junked or scrapped in the immediate aftermath of the war. None of the aircraft acquired during Saddam's time remained in service.

=== Post-invasion ===
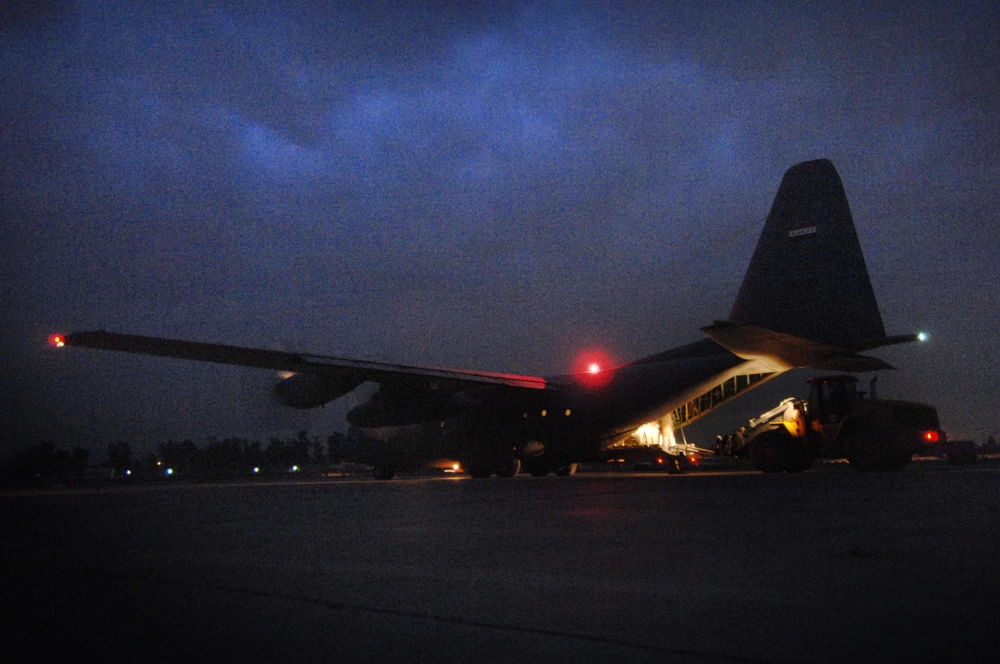
Members of the Iraqi Air Force unload 920 AK-47 assault rifles and uniform items from a C-130 Hercules at Mosul, Iraq on Feb. 16, 2008.

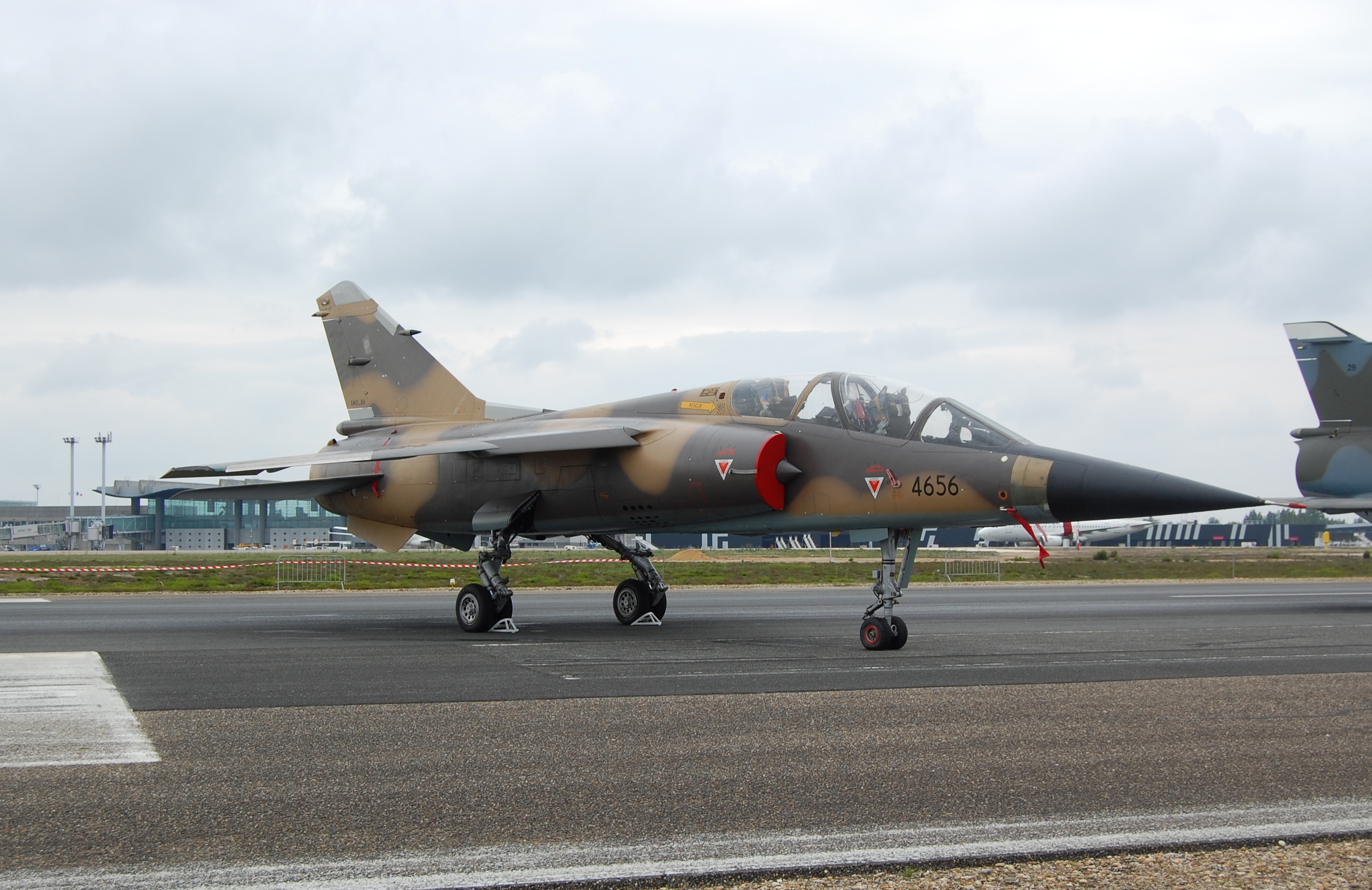
Iraqi Air Force Mirage F1BQ

The Iraqi Air Force, like all Iraqi forces after the 2003 Invasion of Iraq, was rebuilt as part of the overall program to build a new Iraqi defense force. The newly created air force consisted only of 35 people in 2004 when it began operations.

In December 2004, the Iraqi Ministry of Defense signed two contracts with the Polish defence consortium BUMAR. The first contract, worth US$132 million, was for the delivery of 20 PZL W-3 Sokół helicopters and the training of 10 Iraqi pilots and 25 maintenance personnel. They were intended to be delivered by November 2005, but in April 2005 the company charged with fulfilling the contract announced the delivery would not go ahead as planned, because the delivery schedule proposed by PZL Swidnik was not good enough. As a result, only 2 were delivered in 2005 for testing.

The second contract, worth US$105 million, was to supply the Iraqi air force with 24 second-hand Russian-made, re-worked Mi-17 (Hips). As of 2008, 8 had been delivered and 2 more were on their way. The Mi-17s were reported to have some attack capability.

On 18 November 2005, the Coalition Air Force Transition Team (CAFTT), part of Multi-National Security Transition Command - Iraq was established to guide the recreation of the new Iraqi Air Force. During this period, the Air Force primarily served as a light reconnaissance and transport operation. A report of February 2006 detailed the 3rd, 23rd, and 70th Squadrons busy on these missions. The air force also included the IAF Operational Air Headquarters in Baghdad with a major-general commanding and just over 100 staff in staff cells A1-A6, and A7 (Training), A8 (Finance) and A9 (Engineering); the two reconnaissance squadrons (3rd and 70th); 2nd and 4th Squadrons planned to receive Huey II helicopters; 12th Squadron with Bell JetRangers (training) and 15th Squadron due to receive Mi-17 helicopters in early 2006, all at Taji Air Base; and 23rd Squadron flying the C-130s.

On March 4, 2007, the air force carried out its first medical evacuation in the city of Baghdad when an injured police officer was airlifted to a hospital. Also in 2007, the USAF's Second Air Force, part of Air Education and Training Command, was given responsibility to provide curricula and advice to the Iraqi Air Force as it stood up its own technical training and branch specific basic training among others.

In 2009 the first of several Iraqi officers completed their flying training at RAF Cranwell, a development with echos of the Iraqi Air Force's early beginnings.

It was reported in December 2007 that a deal had been reached between the Iraqi government and Serbia for the sale of arms and other military equipment including 36 Lasta 95 basic trainers. It was speculated that Iraq might buy 50 Aérospatiale Gazelle attack helicopters from France. In July 2008, Iraq had formally requested an order for 24 light attack and reconnaissance helicopters. The aircraft would either be the U.S. Army's new ARH-70 helicopter or the MH-6 Little Bird.

On October 14, 2008, Aviation Week reported that two Hellfire-equipped Cessna 208Bs were spotted at an ATK facility in Meacham Airport, Fort Worth, Texas. The Iraqi air force was due to receive three armed Cessna 208Bs in December 2008, with two more to be delivered in 2009. This represented the first IQAF strike capability since the start of the war in 2003. The Iraqi government announced in November 2008 that the Iraqi Air Force would purchase 108 aircraft through 2011. Ultimately the force was to have consisted of up to 516 total aircraft by 2015, then 550 total aircraft by 2018. Specific types being purchased included Eurocopter EC635 and Bell ARH-70 type helicopters. Additionally, 24 T-6 Texan II aircraft would be purchased for the light attack role.

Over the summer of 2008, the Defense Department announced that the Iraqi government wanted to order more than 400 armored vehicles and other equipment worth up to $3 billion, and six C-130J transport planes, worth up to $1.5 billion.

Iraq was due to buy 28 Czech-made L-159 training jets valued at $1 billion (770 million euros). Twenty-four of the planes would be new, while four would come from Czech surplus stocks. Later the deal fell through. However afterwards the Czech aviation company Aero Vodochody reportedly agreed to sell twelve of the jets, although the deal was not yet approved by both countries' governments. There were talks to buy Czech made combat aircraft Aero L-159 Alca with possible sale or oil trade of either 24 or 36 aircraft from Czech Air Force surplus. The purchase was not done and as of 2013, the Czech Republic has not been able to secure its first export deal for its L-159 Alca fighter aircraft. The deal for 24/36 Czech L-159 aircraft was cancelled; instead South Korea supersonic KAI T50 have been chosen (24 aircraft). But in April 2014, Iraq decided to buy 12 second-hand (conserved) L-159 for $200 million.

=== 2010s ===
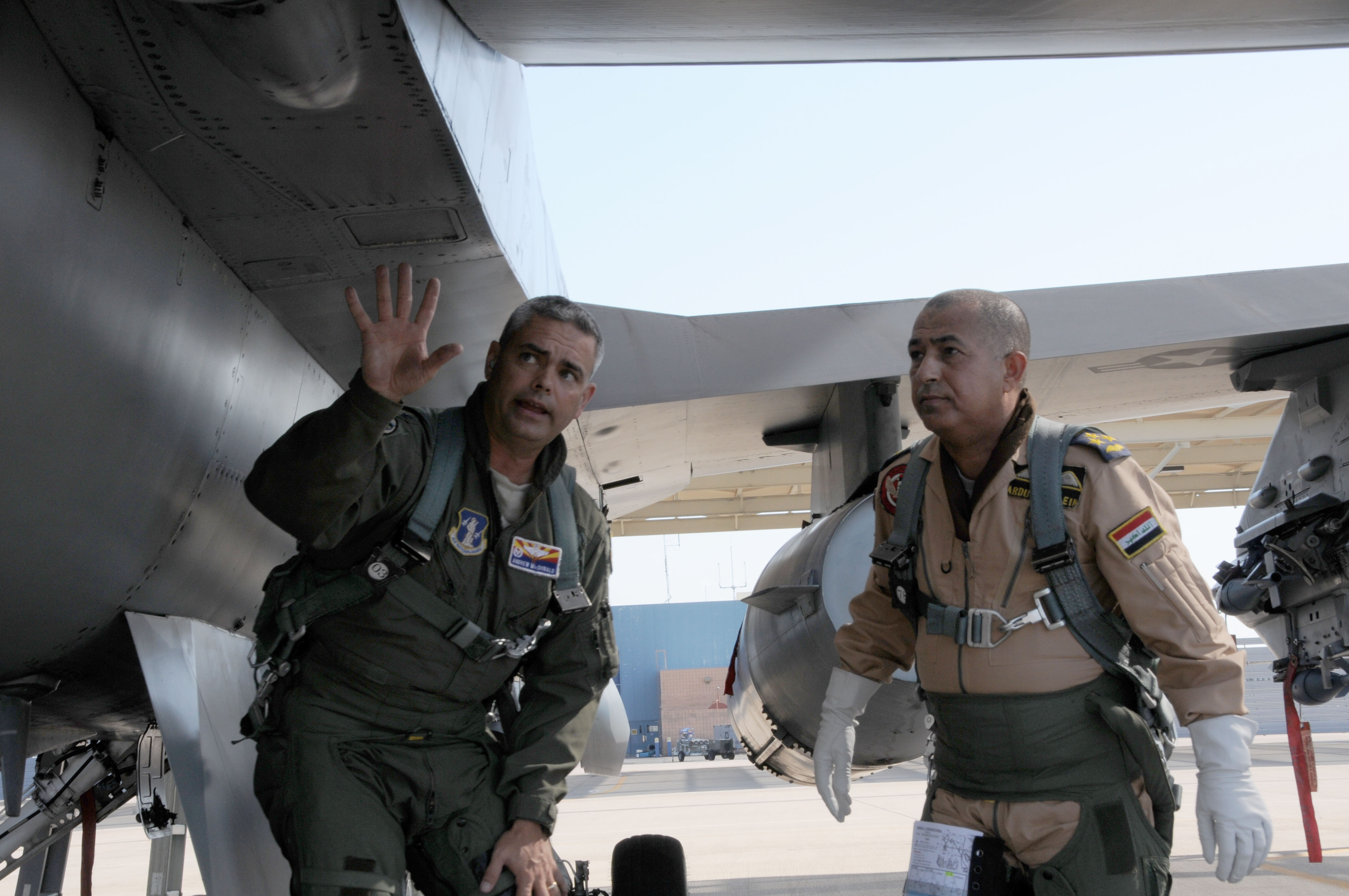
An Iraqi Air Force Commander at an F-16 training session in Arizona.

Throughout 2010 and 2011, the Iraqi government and the MoI announced intentions to buy Dassault Mirage F1 and F-16C Block 52 fighters. The Iraqi cabinet specified a sum of $900m as a first installment of $3b worth of aircraft, equipment, spare parts, and training.

The deal to buy the F-16 fighters seemed to teeter as the MoI reversed its decision on 12 February and wanted to divert the initial sum of $900m to economic reconstruction. However, on the 12 July 2011, the MoI re-iterated its interest in the F-16s due to the pending withdrawal of American forces from Iraq, and later the number of fighters to be purchased was doubled to 36.

Iraq's air space was unguarded from December 2011 until 18 F-16IQ Block 52 jet fighters and their pilots were ready. The first Iraqi F-16 made its inaugural flight in May 2014. It was officially delivered to the IQAF in a ceremony at Fort Worth, Texas, on 5 June 2014.

In October 2012, it was reported that Russia and Iraq may sign a $4.2–$5.0 billion weapons contract, including 30 Mi-28N helicopters. The deal was reportedly cancelled due to Iraqi concerns of corruption, but that concern was addressed, and the Iraqi defense minister stated that "the deal is going ahead". Despite early complications, all parts of the $4.2 billion contracts were signed, and are being executed. The first contract for 10 Mi-28NE helicopters for Iraq will begin delivery in September 2013. A batch of 13 Mi-28NE helicopters was delivered in January 2014.

On 26 June 2014, Prime Minister Nouri al-Maliki said that they "should have sought to buy other jet fighters like British, French and Russian", describing the order of American F-16s as "long-winded" and "deluded". The IQAF instead acquired second-hand jet aircraft from Russia and Belarus to combat ISIS militants in Northern Iraq, with the first batch arriving on 28 June. The Iraqi Ministry of Defense confirmed the purchase of 5 Russian Sukhoi Su-25, uploading a video on its YouTube channel of their arrival. The Islamic Republic of Iran Air Force also delivered seven Su-25s on 1 July, the majority of which were ex-Iraqi aircraft that fled to Iran during the Gulf War.

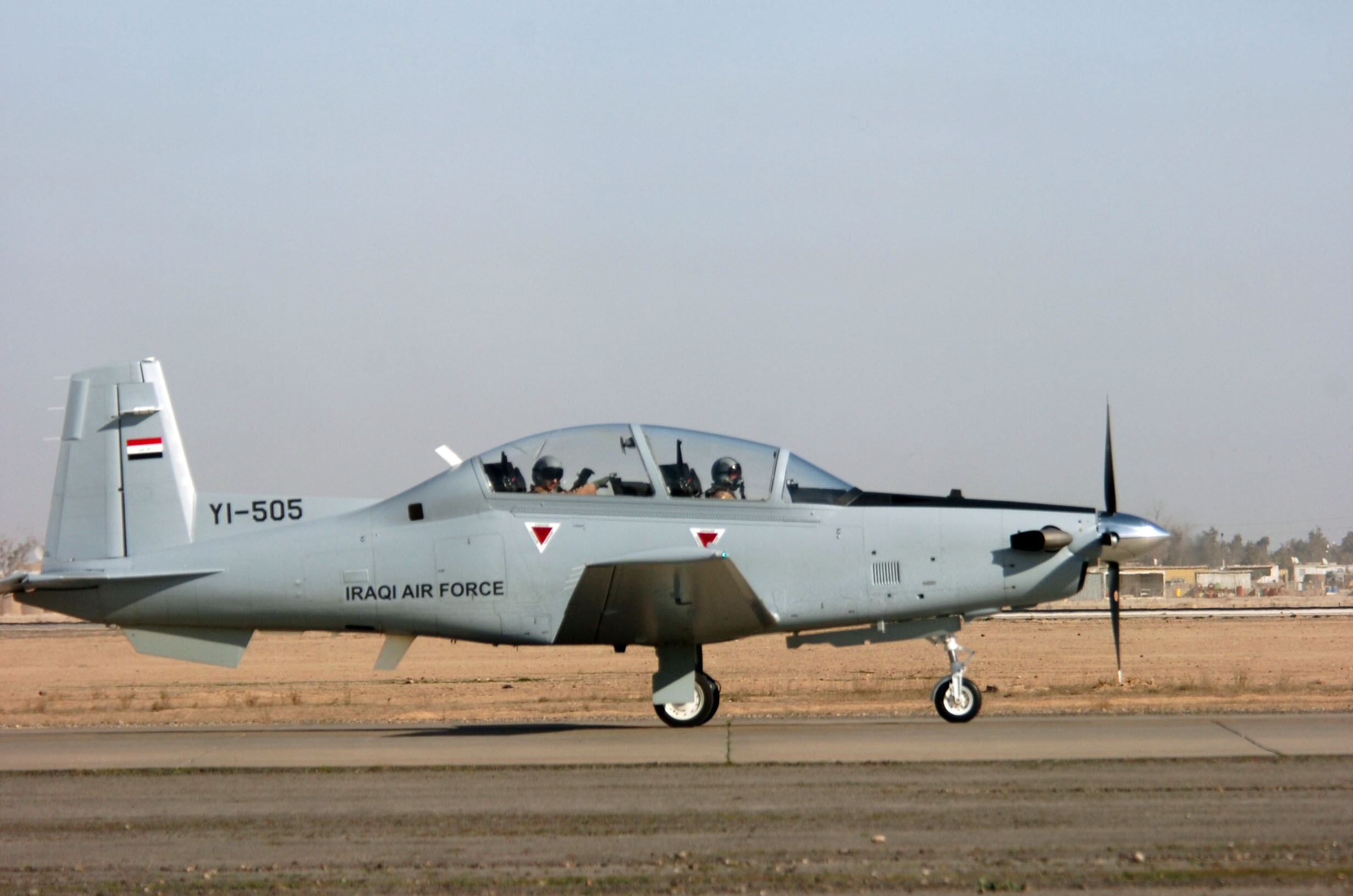
An Iraqi Air Force T-6A Texan II

On 13 July 2015, the Iraqi Air Force received its first batch of F-16 fighters. In addition to the F-16's which are due to be delivered to the Iraqi Air Force throughout the upcoming years, 24 KAI T-50 Golden Eagles are expected to begin deliveries by April 2016 boosting the Iraqi Air Force's defense capabilities. On 5 November 2015, the first two Czech Aero L-159 light combat aircraft were delivered to Iraq. The first group of Iraqi pilots completed training in the Czech company Aero Vodochody on 9 February 2016. Iraq will gain a total of 15 Aero L-159s and Aero Vodochody will make 12 aircraft operable for the Iraqi Air Force. Two other planes will be used for the reconstruction of two aircraft into two-seaters, one will be used for spare parts. For nearly three years, United Kingdom has blocked the sale of L-159s because they contain British radar warning receiver. However, Prime Minister David Cameron agreed to overturn the ban in February 2016 and the sale to Iraq is proceeding.

In December 2014, during a meeting between leaders of Iraq and the United Arab Emirates, the UAE offered up to 10 Mirage 2000 fighters to the Iraqi Air Force. The aircraft could have been delivered by March 2015.

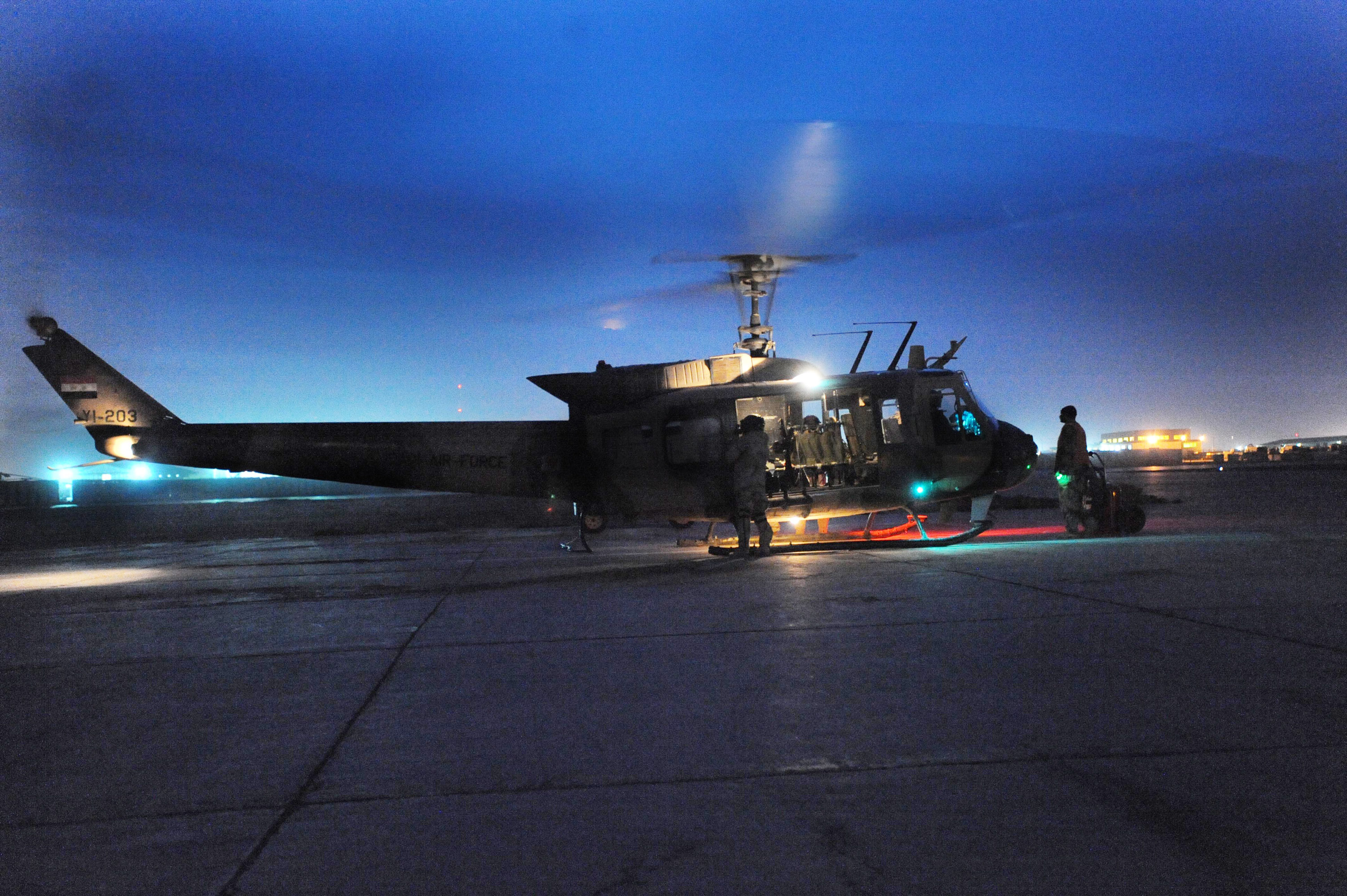
Night flying certification for the UH-1 crews of the Iraqi 2nd Squadron

On 6–7, April 2019, IQAF received six new F-16s. According to Brigadier Yahya Rasool, Ministry of Defence (Iraq)'s Security Media Cell spokesperson, the latest delivery brought Iraq's F-16 fleet to 27.

Among operating squadrons of the air force today are: 3rd Squadron; 9th Squadron (F-16s); 23rd Squadron; 70th Squadron; 87th Squadron (B 350ER); 109th Squadron (Sukhoi Su-25); 115th Squadron (L-159); and possibly 2nd Squadron.

=== 2020s ===
During the 2026 Iran War, an Iraqi An-32B transport aircraft was damaged in its hangar when the Popular Mobilization Front - Iranian backed militia - used a Shaheb-12 missile that landed in Baghdad International Airport.

=== Acquisitions and modernization ===
On 24 April 2024, the Iraqi Ministry of Defense confirmed that the Iraqi Air Force had acquired Chinese-made CH-5 medium-altitude long-endurance (MALE) attack-reconnaissance drones. The CH-5 is considered a competitor to the American MQ-9 Reaper. Iraqi security forces used CH-5 drones for the first time to target ISIS positions in 2024.

In 2024, Iraq signed a deal for 14 Airbus H225M Caracal multi-role helicopters from France. The first two helicopters were delivered in May 2025 and entered service with Iraqi Army Aviation in June 2025.

Iraq is also in final negotiations to acquire 14 Rafale F4 fighter jets from France in 2026, comprising 10 single-seat Rafale C and four two-seat Rafale B variants.

As of late 2026, the potential acquisition of JF 17 block III remains in the negotiations a finalized, legally binding purchase contract for the aircraft has not yet been officially signed by the governments of Iraq and Pakistan.

== Air Force commanders ==
- 1930–1931, Natiq Muhammad Khalil at-Tayi
- 1931–1932, Mohammed Ali Jawad
- 1932–1933, Ibrahim Hamdi ar-Rawi
- 1933–1936, Ismail Ibrahim Namaq
- 1936 (January–June), Shakir Abdul Wahhab
- 1936 (June–November), Khalid al-Zahrawi
- 1936, Mohammed Ali Jawad
- 1937 (12-14 August), Shakir al-Wadi
- 1937 (August–October), Salah ad-Din as-Sabagh
- 1937–1938, Akram Mushtak
- 1938–1941, Mahmud Salman
- 1941–1954, Brigadier Sami Fattah al-Musli
- 1954 (May–October), Munir Abbass Hilmi Moheidin
- 1954, 14 July 1958, Abdul Kadhim Abaddi
- 1958–1963, Jalal Jaffar Al-Awqat
- 1963 (February–March), Arif Abd ar-Razzaq
- 1963 (March–December), Hardan al-Tikriti
- 1963–1965, Arif Abd ar-Razzaq
- 1965–1966, Munir Abbass Hilmi Moheidin
- 1966–1968, Jassam Mohammed Al-Saher
- 1968–1970, Hardan al-Tikriti
- 1970–1973, Hiyawi Hamash at-Tikriti
- 1973–1976, Nimma Abdullah ad-Dulaimi
- 1976–1978, Hamid Sha'ban at-Tikriti
- 1978–1984, Mohammed Jassim Hanish al-Jaboury
- 1985, Air Marshal Hamid Sha'aban
- 1985–1994, Muzahim Sa'b Hassan al-Tikriti
- 1994–2003, Hamid Raja Shalah
- 2005–2008, Kamal Barzanji
- 2008–2019, Anwar Hama Amin
- 2020–2025, Shihab Jahid Ali
- 2025–2026, Muhannad Ghalib al-Asadi
- 2026–present, Khalid Mirdas al-Tamimi

== Aircraft ==
=== Current inventory ===
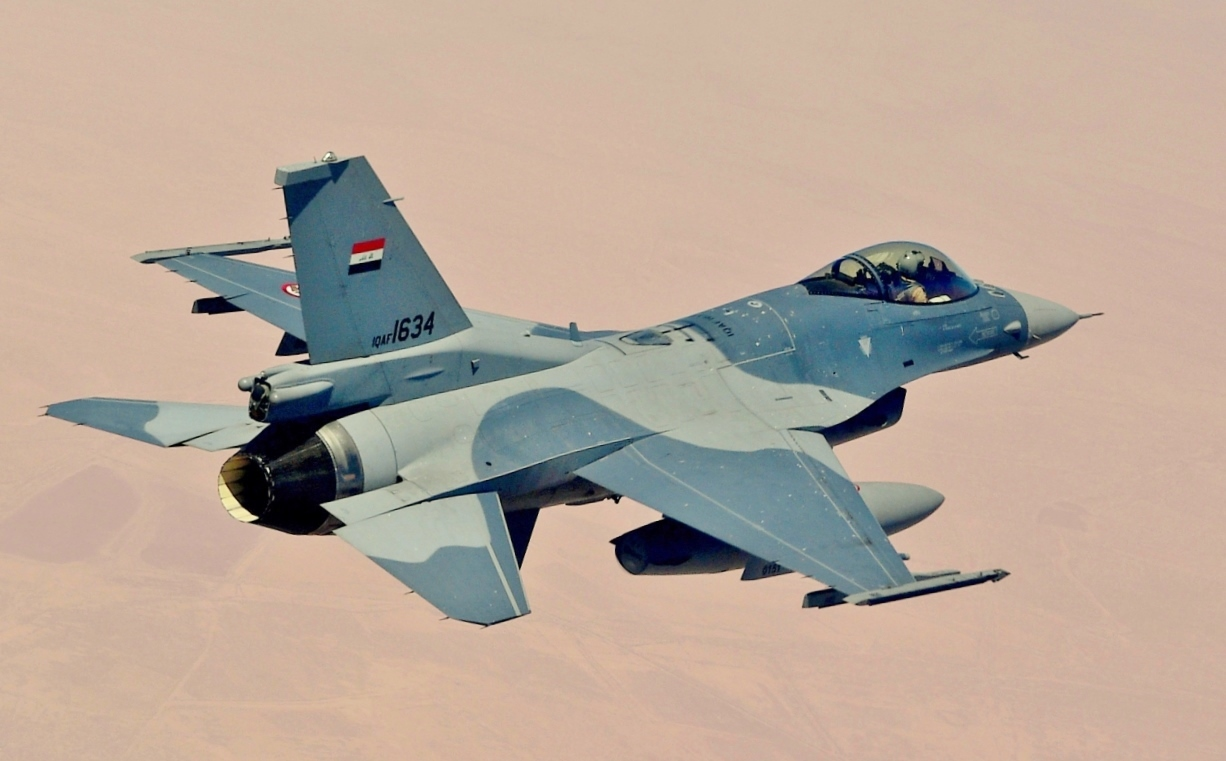
Iraqi Air Force F-16 Fighting Falcon flies over an undisclosed location July 18, 2019

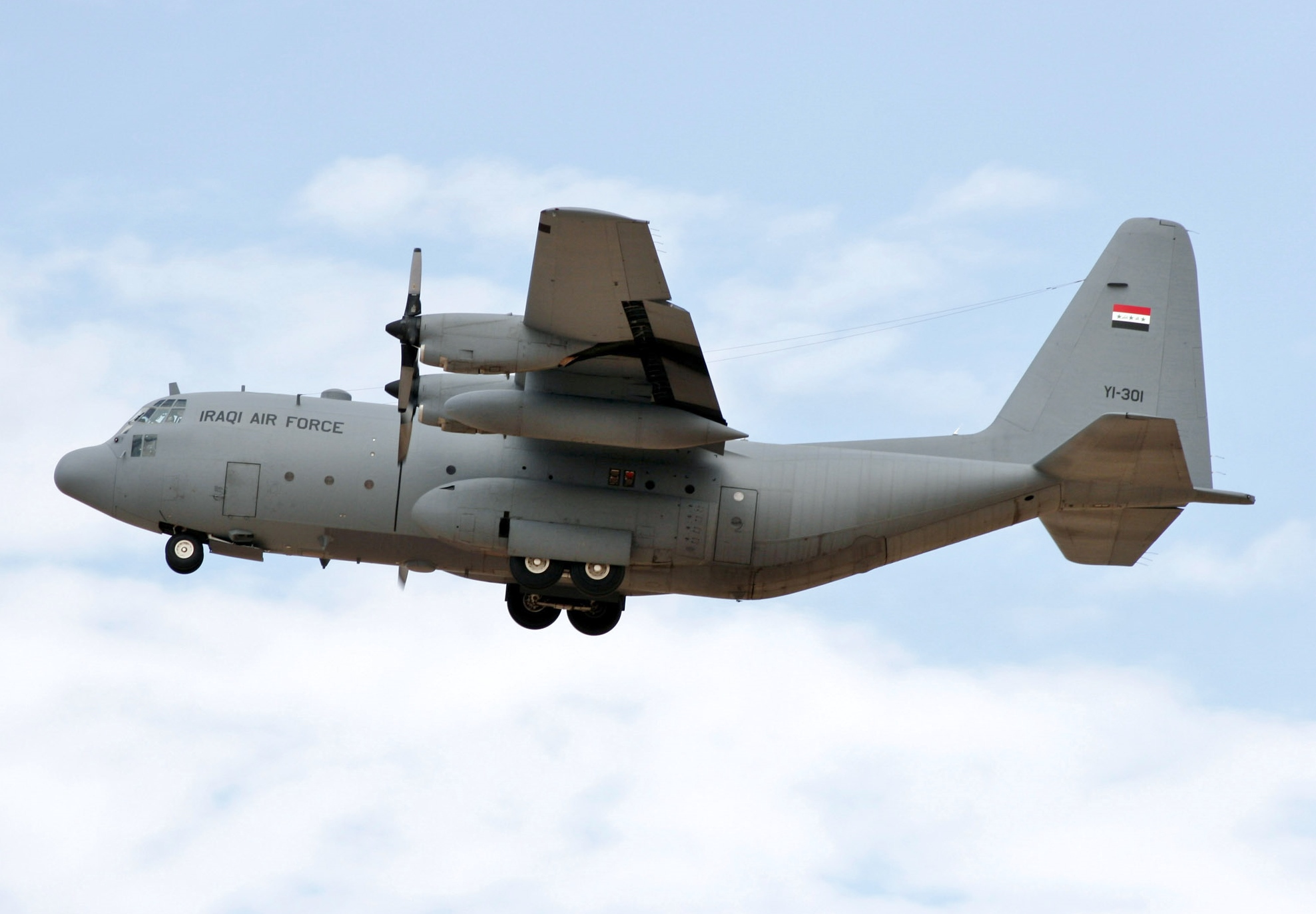
Iraqi C-130 on take off

Aircraft	Origin	Type	Variant	In service	Notes
Combat aircraft
Dassault Rafale	France	Multirole	Rafale F4		+14 on possible order
F-16 Fighting Falcon	United States	Multirole	F-16C/D/IQ	34	8 D variants provide conversion training, the Iraqi government plans to purchase around 96 F-16s.
Aero L-159	Czech Republic	Light attack	L-159A	14	One T1 variant used for conversion training
Sukhoi Su-25	Russia	Attack		19	5 used for conversion training
KAI T-50	South Korea	Jet trainer / Light combat aircraft / Light fighter	T-50IQ	24	
Cessna 208	United States	Attack	AC-208	2	Modified for ground attack
Reconnaissance
Cessna 208	United States	Reconnaissance	RC-208	6	Four used for training
AMD Alarus	United States	Surveillance	SAMA CH2000	7	
Super King Air	United States	Surveillance	350ER	6	
DHC-6 Twin Otter	Canada	Surveillance		2	STOL capable aircraft
Transport
Super King Air	United States	Utility / Transport	350	1	
C-130 Hercules	United States	Tactical airlifter	C-130E	3	In store
C-130J Super Hercules	United States	Tactical airlifter		6	
Antonov An-32	Ukraine	Transport	An-32B	6	Two are combat capable and one is damaged
Helicopters
Bell 412	United States	Utility			12 on order
Mil Mi-8	Russia	Transport		2	
Aérospatiale Gazelle	France	Scout / Anti-armor	SA342	6	
H225M Caracal	France	Transport / CSAR		2	14 ordered in 2024; first two delivered May 2025
Trainer aircraft
Bell 206	United States	Rotorcraft trainer		9	
Lasta 95	Serbia	Light trainer		19	
T-6 Texan II	United States	Trainer	T-6A	15	
MFI-17 Mushshak	Pakistan	Trainer	MFI-395	4	8 on order
UAVs
CH-5 Rainbow	China	UCAV	CH-5	~10	Armed attack/reconnaissance drone

== Rank insignia ==
=== Commissioned officer ranks ===
The rank insignia of commissioned officers.

Rank group	General / flag officers					Senior officers			Junior officers
Iraqi Air Force
Iraqi Air Force	مشیر; Mushir	فريق أول; Fariq 'awal	فريق; Fariq	لواء; Liwa	عميد; Amid	عقيد; Aqid	مقدم; Muqaddam	رائد; Ra'id	نقيب; Naqib	ملازم أول; Mulazim awwal	ملازم; Mulazim

=== Other ranks ===
The rank insignia of non-commissioned officers and enlisted personnel.

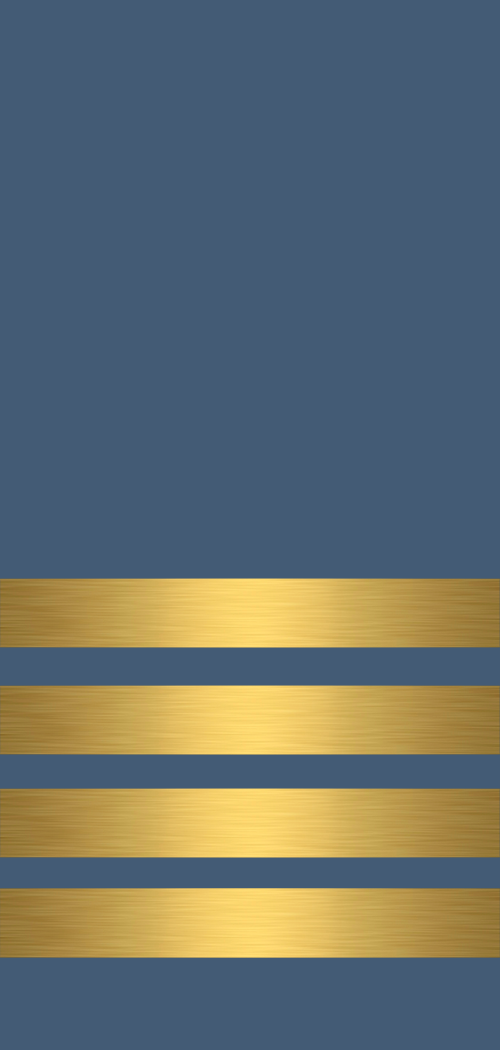
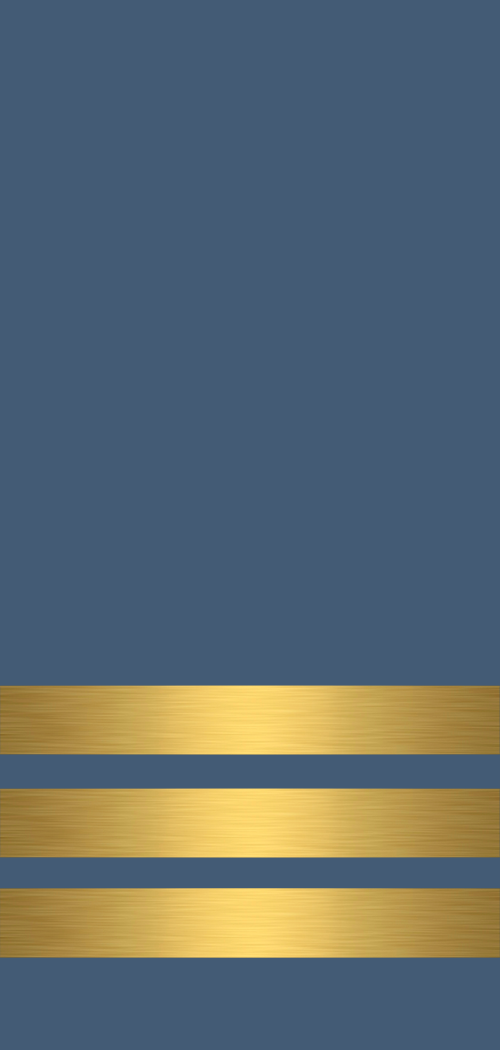
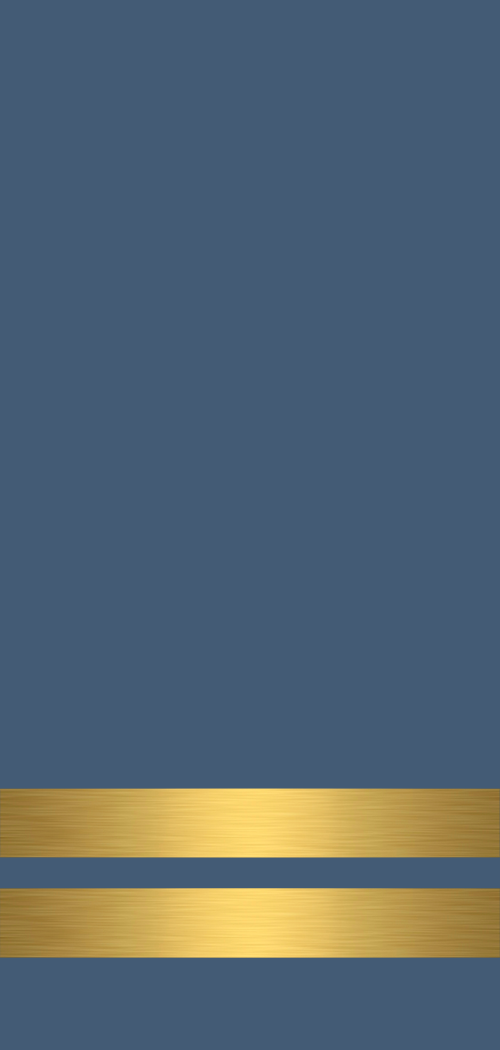
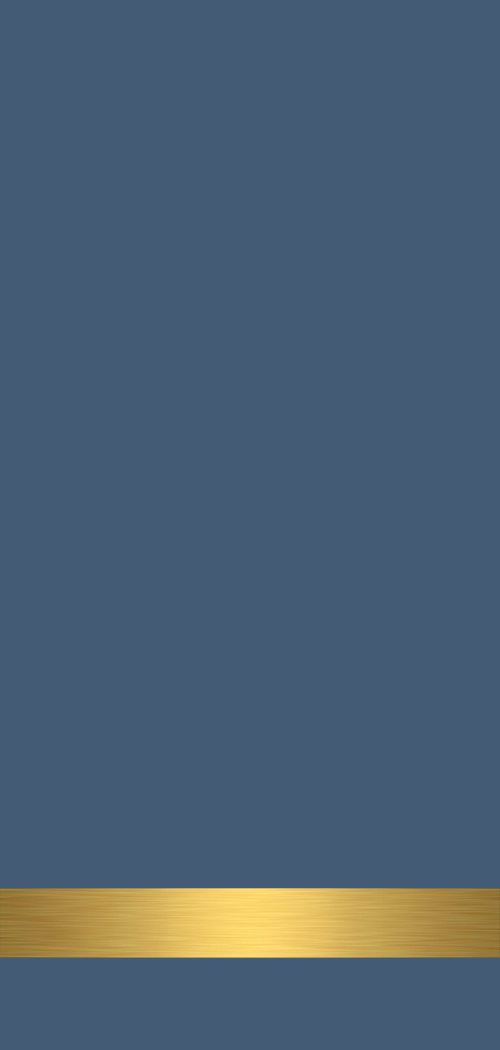
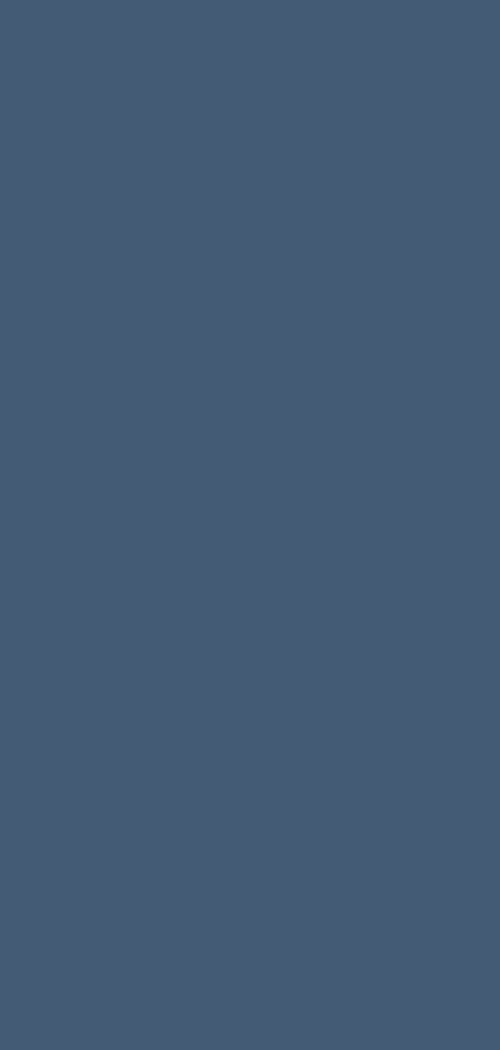
Rank group	Senior NCOs			Junior NCOs	Enlisted
Iraqi Air Force
Iraqi Air Force	نائب ضابط; Nayib dabit	رقيب أول; Raqib 'awal	رقیب; Raqib	عريف; Earif	جندي أول; Jundi awwal	جندي; Jundi

== See also ==
- List of Iraqi Air Force aircraft squadrons
- Iraqi Air Defence Command

== Bibliography ==
- Sipos, Milos; Cooper, Tom (2020). Wings of Iraq, Volume 1: The Iraqi Air Force, 1931-1970. Warwick, UK: Helion & Company Publishing. ISBN 978-1-913118-74-7.
- Sipos, Milos; Cooper, Tom (2022). Wings of Iraq, Volume 2: The Iraqi Air Force, 1970-1980. Warwick, UK: Helion & Company Publishing. ISBN 978-1-914377-17-4.
