= 109th Squadron (Iraq) =

109th Attack Squadron
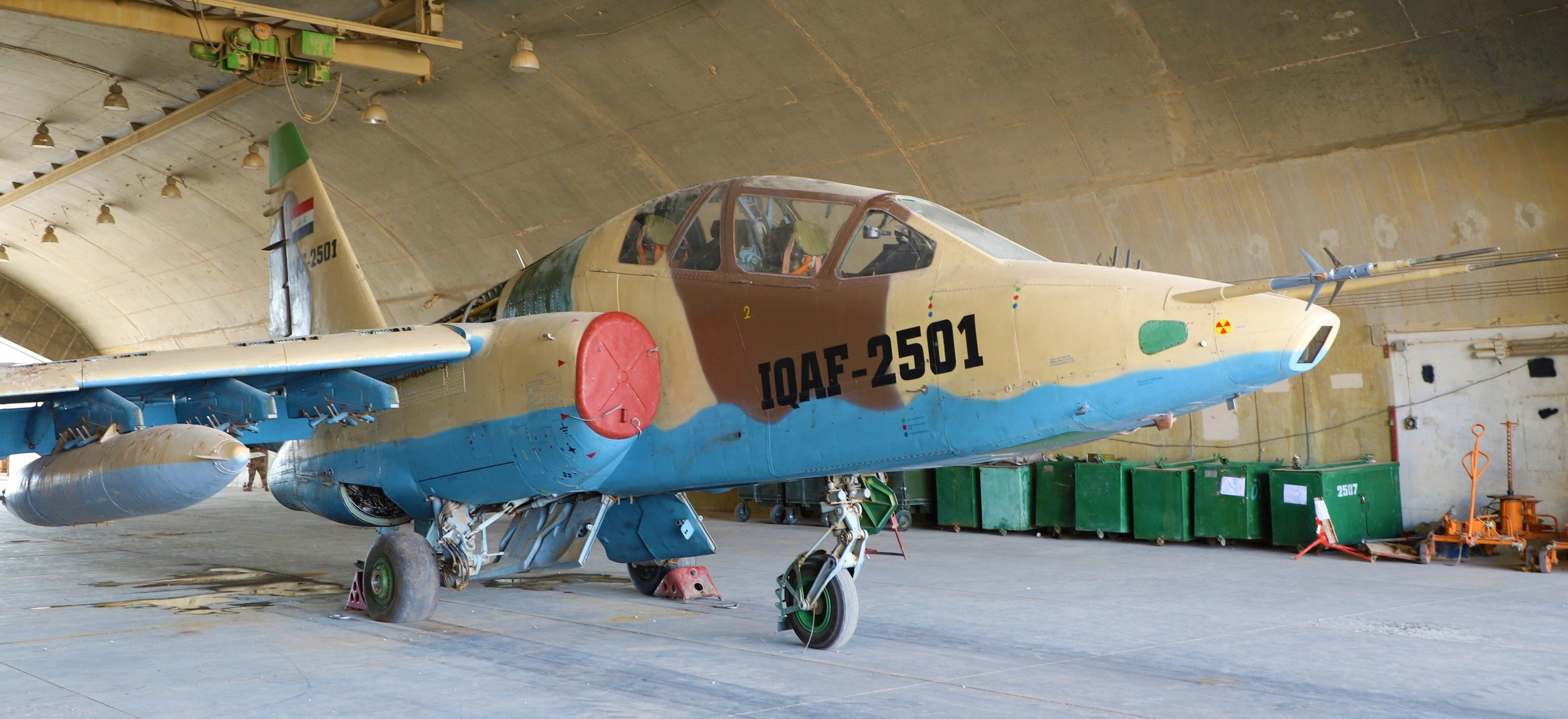
- Su-25 of the 109th Squadron in 2022
- Active: 1978-2003; 2015-current
- Country: Iraq
- Branch: Iraqi Air Force
- Role: Ground attack
- Base: Al Rasheed Air Base

Insignia
- Fin Flash

Aircraft flown
- Attack: Sukhoi Su-25

The 109th Attack Squadron is an Iraqi Air Force ground-attack squadron. It operates the Sukhoi Su-25 from Al Rasheed Air Base.

== Twentieth century ==
No. 109 Squadron was established in 1978. It was equipped with Sukhoi Su-22s, and was based at Wahda AB near Basra. No. 109 Squadron's pilots became the first in Iraq to receive dedicated training for anti-ship attacks.

The squadron participated in the three waves of Iraqi air strikes on Iran on the first day of the Iran-Iraq War. It did not lose any aircraft on that day.

== Twenty-first century ==
On 2 April 2015, the Iraqi Ministry of Defence confirmed that the 109th Attack Squadron had been formed at Rasheed Air Base to operate the Sukhoi Su-25s the country received from Russia and Iran. The first of these aircraft had arrived in Iraq on 28 June 2014.
