= 115th Squadron (Iraq) =

115th Squadron, Iraqi Air Force
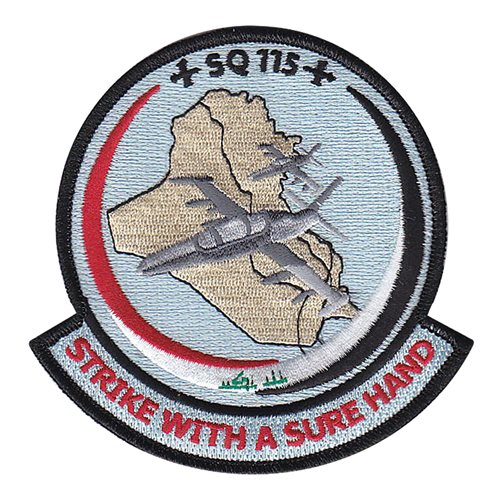
- Official logo
- Active: 2015–present
- Country: Iraq
- Branch: Iraqi Air Force
- Role: Attack
- Base: Balad Air Base
- Engagements: Iraqi Civil War (2014–2017)

Insignia
- Fin Flash

Aircraft flown
- Attack: L-159 ALCA

The 115th Squadron, Iraqi Air Force is a squadron. It is based at Balad Air Base. Established in 2015, the 115th Squadron operates Czech-built Aero L-159 light combat aircraft with the first two delivered on 5 November 2015. Since 1 August 2016, the squadron is supported by the "Air Advisory Team Iraq" of the Czech Air Force. Its main task is to advise during operational training of Iraqi Air Force's air and ground personnel over flying and maintenance of L-159 aircraft supplied by the Czech Republic.
