= Rasheed Air Base =

Military airport in Diyala Governorate, Iraq

Al Rasheed Air Base
- Diyala Governorate in Iraq

Site information
- Type: Air Base
- Owner: Iraqi Armed Forces
- Operator: Iraqi Air Force

Location
- Shown within Iraq
- Coordinates: 33°16′40″N 044°29′41″E

Site history
- Built: 1922
- In use: 1922-present

Airfield information
- Identifiers: ICAO: ORRA
- Elevation: 34 metres (112 ft) AMSL
Runways
| Direction | Length and surface |
|---|---|
| 15/33 | 2,500 metres (8,202 ft) Asphalt |

Al Rasheed Air Base (also known as Al Salam Air Base, ICAO: ORRA) is a major Iraqi Air Force base on the southeastern outskirts of Baghdad, in Diyala Governorate of Iraq.

It is located approximately 11 kilometers (6.8 mi) southeast of downtown Baghdad. The air base is served by an 8,300 feet long runway. According to the Gulf War Air Power Survey, there were 10 hardened aircraft shelters at Rasheed as of 1991.

Iraqi Air Force's 109 Squadron which flies the Sukhoi Su-25 is based there.

== History ==
=== Royal Air Force use ===
Al Rasheed Air Base was originally a British Military base and airfield developed after the First World War and from 1922 became the main base for the British Royal Air Force (RAF) and called RAF Hinaidi. When the RAF built their new base at RAF Dhibban (renamed RAF Habbaniya on 1 May 1938), the RAF began, in 1936, to leave RAF Hinaidi Cantonment and when the move was complete in 1938 it was handed over to the Royal Iraqi Air Force.

=== Iran–Iraq War ===
The airbase was bombed in Operation Kaman 99, on the second day of the Iran–Iraq War of the 1980s, just after the Iraqi invasion of Iran, and was not operable for 69 days, according to Iranian reports.

=== Iraqi military use prior to 2003 ===
The Iraqi Military Intelligence Military Brigade stationed there included a rapid intervention battalion to respond to security threats in the Baghdad region. By early 1998, the 6th Special Republican Guard Battalion, stationed at al-Rashid barracks, was charged with the responsibility to seal off the Shi'i "Saddam City" quarter and bombard it indiscriminately in case of mass revolt, as the Guard did in Najaf and Karbala in 1991.

By April 2002, the government moved several units outside Al-Rasheed military camp.

=== 2003 U.S. invasion of Iraq ===
On 31 March 2003, American warplanes bombed the barracks of the main training center of the Iraqi paramilitary forces in eastern Baghdad's Rustamiyah area. Later, the base was captured during the following 2003 invasion of Iraq in March–April 2003.

In mid-April 2003, U.S. Navy Construction Battalion forces ("Seabees") roamed through a hastily deserted Iraqi military academy. The Seabees, from Port Hueneme's Naval Mobile Construction Battalion 4 Task Force Mike, set up camp in the military academy's sports stadium.

=== Coalition military use ===
==== Camp Falcon/FOB Falcon/Camp Loyalty ====
In late September 2003, one major project for the 439th Engineer Battalion was the construction of Camp Falcon. They also finished repairing a compound for the Iraqi Civil Defense Corps.

In December 2003, paratroopers from the 2nd Brigade Combat Team, 82nd Airborne Division began Jumpmaster Refresher Courses, Jumpmaster Pretests and Air Movement Operations Courses at Camp Falcon. The classes were being conducted at the forward operating base in southern Baghdad to prepare the brigade for redeployment and assumption of their mission back at Fort Bragg, NC, early 2004. The brigade is part of Task Force 1st Armored Division. The Army's barracks included a full mess, high-speed Internet access, and Armed Forces television.

The 1st Armored Division Artillery accepted authority of the Al Rashid district in southern Baghdad from 2nd Brigade, 82nd Airborne Division, during a transfer of authority ceremony at Camp Falcon, 23 January 2004. The Division Artillery Combat Team looked forward to working with the Iraqi Civil Defense Corps, specifically the 504th battalion and Alpha Company, 36th Battalion, which called Camp Falcon home.

On 10 October 2006, at approximately 10:40 p.m., an 82mm mortar round, fired by militia forces from a residential area in Abu T-Shir, caused a fire at an Ammunition Supply Point (ASP) at FOB Falcon. The ASP, containing tank and artillery rounds, in addition to smaller caliber ammunition, set off a series of large explosions. About 100 troops from the 4th Infantry Division were reported to be stationed at the base at the time, but no injuries were reported.

==== Camp Falcon/Camp Al-Saqr ====
In mid-September 2004, as part of an Army-wide effort to give its facilities around Baghdad friendlier connotations, and try to resolve the issue of constantly changing facility names, Camp Ferrin-Huggins reverted to its previous name of Camp Falcon, with the Arabic translation "Camp Al-Saqr".

By late January 2004 at Camp Falcon, on the southern outskirts, a base camp for 5,000 was planned.

The 1st Cavalry Division's 5th Brigade Combat Team assumed the mission of securing Baghdad's Al Rashid District from the 1st Armored Division's Division Artillery Combat Team at a transfer-of-authority ceremony 6 April 2004. Col. Stephen Lanza was the 1st Cavalry's 5th Brigade Combat Team, or Red Team, commander. Since arriving in Iraq a year ago, the 1st Armored's DivArty Combat Team had completed a number of different missions. The DIVARTY Combat Team, the 1st Battalion, 94th Field Artillery Regiment, and the 1st Battalion, 4th Air Defense Artillery Regiment, led the force protection package at Baghdad International Airport. Later, the unit set up a counter-battery center to combat the mortar and rocket fire into the airport and 1st Armored's headquarters. In January 2004, they moved to Forward Operating Base Falcon. The 1st Squadron, 1st Cavalry Regiment and Task Force 2nd Battalion, 504th Parachute Infantry Regiment were later added to the DIVARTY Combat Team and assumed responsibility of the city's Al Rashid District.

Some places of recreation are found in less likely areas. One such area lies outside in a corner of the Headquarters Company barracks next to the 5th Brigade Combat Team headquarters on Camp Ferrin Huggins. An I-beam lies on the cracked asphalt; its edges coated in wax. A dismounted handrail put in place by sandbags stands 10 inches off the ground. The sight might confuse bystanders, until its architects arrive. The sun begins to set and four friends convene with weapons slung as they cling onto wheeled boards before slapping them on the pavement, and this assembly of random objects begins to look more like a crude excuse for a skate park.

Previous construction work at the Forward Operating Base Ferrin-Huggins site had been done fast and cheap. Soldiers later were assigned with the renovation of a series of concrete housing facilities that had been previously hurriedly constructed by the Iraqis. They were constructed so fast, in fact, that the landfill they were built on had not been properly compacted and allowed settlement time. After the buildings went up and weathered the rainy season, the floors gave, breaking all the water systems. The soldiers had to replace those systems and as well as restore the buildings, with Army engineers also providing input to contracting.

As of late December 2004, Camp Falcon was also home to a spacious PX. For Thanksgiving 2004, meals were provided for 3,000 by Camp Falcon's canteen and kitchen staff.

During their time at Camp Falcon, Assault and Obstacle Platoon of Company B, 8th Engineer Battalion, 1st Cavalry Division has 'enjoyed' much on-the-job training. An example is the installation of a sewage system, a task usually taken on by civilians or combat-heavy engineers. The sewage pipeline will allow the entire camp access to Baghdad's main sewage grid, eliminating the need for the current septic tank system, as well as the cost that comes with periodical pumping. With a total of seven weeks work, the pipe system was expected to be complete late January 2005.

The project is just one of many the Assault and Obstacle Platoon had taken on from Forward Operating Base Falcon's base operations. The platoon has built and demolished walls, supervised the construction of barracks, and made an array of other structures on post. However, from time to time to the soldiers have got to indulge in the job they joined the Army for.

Camp Falcon uses multilayered defenses with high-walled perimeters and lookout towers. Like any military fortification, however, the gate relies heavily on manpower.

==== Camp Muleskinner ====
Camp Muleskinner, six miles southeast of Sadr City, was home to part of the 2nd Armored Cavalry Regiment. The dining facility at Camp Muleskinner is also called the KBR, as it is built and operated by the company Kellogg, Brown and Root. The 411th Civil Affairs, was based here. It was also home for the support units of the 2nd Armored Cavalry Regiment. The name comes from the days when the cavalry sometimes had to eat their own mules to survive. The 411th Civil Affairs was based at the Canal Hotel compound, where UN headquarters was. But it was the target of two bombings so they moved.

The 2nd Cavalry Regimental Change of Command occurred in Baghdad on 18 June at 0700 hrs at Muleskinner Base adjacent to Redcatcher Field in a little soccer field at the old Iraqi Republican Guard Training Facility (now occupied by RSS, 4/2 ACR, 2nd Battalion, 6th Infantry (2-6 INF), and 3-7 INF).

By late January 2004, engineers from the 1st Armored Division were midway through an $800 million project to build half a dozen camps for the incoming 1st Cavalry Division. Army planners expected to finish by 15 March 2004. The new outposts, dubbed Enduring Camps, were to improve living quarters for soldiers and allow the military to return infrastructure sites within the Iraqi capital to the new government, according to military leaders. "The plan is for the camps to last five to 10 years," said Col. Lou Marich, commander of the 1st AD engineers. "They will last longer if we take care of them." Moving to the outskirts of town will allow Iraqi police and the Iraqi Civil Defense Corps to take a lead role in the city's security. In Al-Rastimiya, the former Iraqi officers war college sits on what troops called Camp Muleskinner.

On 9 January 2004, the Iraq Civil Defense Corps Academy at Camp Muleskinner graduated its first class of guardsmen on Redcatcher Field. The ICDC School, run by noncommissioned officers and soldiers from the 2nd Armored Cavalry Regiment and 2nd Battalion, 37th Armor Battalion, 1st Armored Division, put newly recruited individuals through a six-day course. The new ICDC recruits ate, slept, and trained on the academy grounds, staying immersed in the military environment under the eyes of the cadre.

During the 140 hours spent at the ICDC Academy, the students learned multiple tasks, from basic rifle marksmanship to traffic control point operations. The students were introduced to calling cadence, executing orders while marching and keeping in step. As the week progressed, the cadence calling was turned over to the students. During basic rifle marksmanship training, the students were taught how to load, charge, fire, and clear their weapons.

==== Camp Cuervo ====
On April 1, 2004, Camp Muleskinner was renamed in honor of trooper Rey Cuervo, who was killed in Baghdad on December 28, 2003. Camp Cuervo serves as the home of the 2nd Armored Cavalry Regiment's support squadron.

Tankers of White Platoon, "Cobra" Company of the 2nd Battalion, 8th Cavalry Regiment, 1st Brigade Combat Team (BCT), left the gates of Camp Cuervo the night of 29 July to patrol their sector in north-eastern Baghdad, they decidedly left their Abrams' behind them. Instead, White Platoon rolled out in its more mobile, but still quite noticeable up-armored humvees. It wasn't long however, before they came to a stop, parked the vehicles, and threw open their doors to begin part of its patrol that is usually left to the infantry: the foot patrol.

Eight civilians and four Iraqi police officers were killed 13 June 2004 in a car bombing outside Camp Cuervo, a joint US-Iraqi military base in eastern Baghdad. Twelve people were injured in the attack.

==== Camp Cuervo Detention Facility ====
The base hosts a detention facility which is a converted indoor pistol range serves as an initial processing and detention center with detainees being deemed of having taken part in anti-coalition activities being kept there for additional periods of time before being transferred to the Abu Ghraib Prison.

==== Camp Redcatcher/Redcatcher Field ====
"Redcatcher" field is named for the former call signs of the 2nd Armored Cavalry Regiment's aviators.

As the soldiers of 2ACR began their seventh month of work in Baghdad in support of Operation Iraqi Freedom, important time was spent identifying the Non Commissioned Officer and Soldier of the Year for 2003 it started on 16 September 2003.

==== Engineer Base Anvil ====
On 15 April 2003 the Marine's 7th Engineer Support Battalion moved to the outskirts of Baghdad where they set up camp in the compound of the Iraqi Republican Guard Headquarters and named the area Engineer Base Anvil. The camp in Baghdad was an Iraqi Republican Guard training base (like boot camp). Once there the 7th ESB linked up with 1st and 2nd Combat Engineer Battalions and also 8th Engineer Support Battalion EOD (Explosive Ordnance Disposal). They set up camp in the middle of their obstacle and ropes course. For the next four days they collected unexploded ordnance from the base as well as the nearby town.

=== Iraqi Air Force use ===
Between 2004 and 2009 a new hangar was built on the western side.

In the weeks after ISIS swept across northern Iraq, Iran set up a special control center at Rasheed Air Base in Baghdad and flew a small fleet of Ababil surveillance drones over Iraq. An Iranian signals intelligence unit was also reportedly deployed at the airfield to intercept electronic communications between ISIS fighters and commanders.

The airbase is used by 109th Squadron which flies the Sukhoi Su-25.
