= List of conflicts in Iraq =

An orthographic projection map detailing the present-day location and territorial extent of Iraq in Asia.

This is a list of conflicts in Iraq arranged chronologically from ancient to modern times. This list includes any raid, strike, skirmish, siege, sacking, and/or battle (land, naval, and air) that occurred on the territories of what may today be referred to as Iraq; however, in which the conflict itself may have only been part of an operation of a campaign in a theater of a greater war (e.g. any and/or all border, undeclared, colonial, proxy, liberation, global wars, etc.). There may also be periods of violent, civil unrest listed; such as, shootouts, spree killings, massacres, terrorist attacks, coups, assassinations, regicides, riots, rebellions, revolutions, and civil wars (as well as wars of succession and/or independence). The list might also contain episodes of human sacrifice, mass suicide, and ethnic cleansing/genocide.

== Ancient times (c. 3300 BCE – c. 651 CE) ==
Approximated dates	Name of conflict	Belligerents	
Approximated dates	Name of conflict	Victorious parties (if applicable)	Defeated parties (if applicable)
Early Dynastic period (c. 2900 – c. 2334 BCE)
c. 2600 BCE	Sumer–Elam war	Sumerians	Elamites
c. 2600 BCE	Siege of Uruk Part of Mesopotamia Early Dynastic Period wars	Urukians (Sumerians)	Kishites (Semites)
c. 2450 BCE	Umma–Lagash war	Lagashites (Sumerians)	Ummaites (Sumerians)
c. 2340 BCE	Battle of Uruk Part of the Conquests of Sargon of Akkad	Akkadians (Semites)	Urukians (Sumerians)
Neo-Assyrian period (c. 911 – c. 626 BCE)
693 BCE	Battle of Diyala River Part of the Campaigns of Sennacherib	Assyrians	Babylonians (Semites)
689 BCE	Siege of Babylon Part of the Campaigns of Sennacherib	Assyrians	Babylonians (Semites)
Neo-Babylonian period (c. 626 – c. 539 BCE)
626 BCE	Revolt of Babylon Part of the Medo-Babylonian conquest of the Assyrian Empire	Babylonians (Semites)	Assyrians
616 BCE	Battle of Arrapḫa Part of the Medo-Babylonian conquest of the Assyrian Empire	Babylonians (Semites); Medians	Assyrians
614 BCE	Fall of Assur Part of the Medo-Babylonian conquest of the Assyrian Empire	Medians	Assyrians
612 BCE	Battle of Nineveh Part of the Medo-Babylonian conquest of the Assyrian Empire	Babylonians (Semites); Medians; Scythians; Persians; Cimmerians	Assyrians
Achaemenid period (c. 539 – c. 330 BCE)
September 539 BCE	Battle of Opis Part of the Persian conquest of Babylonia	Persians	Babylonians (Semites)
1 October 331 BCE	Battle of Gaugamela Part of the Wars of Alexander the Great	Macedonians	Persians
Hellenistic period (c. 330 – c. 31 BCE)
May–August 311 BCE	First siege of Babylon Part of the Wars of the Diadochi and Babylonian War	Seleucids	Antigonids
311 BCE	Battle of the Tigris Part of the Wars of the Diadochi and Babylonian War	Seleucids	Antigonids
310 BCE	Second Siege of Babylon Part of the Wars of the Diadochi and Babylonian War	Seleucids	Antigonids
January–March 309 BCE	Third Siege of Babylon Part of the Wars of the Diadochi and Babylonian War	Antigonids	Seleucids
10 August 309 BCE	Battle of the 25 of Abu Part of the Wars of the Diadochi and Babylonian War	Seleucids	Antigonids
Roman period (c. 31 – c. 375 BCE)
198 CE	Battle of Ctesiphon Part of the Roman–Parthian Wars	Romans	Parthians
217 CE	Battle of Nisibis Part of the Roman–Parthian Wars	Parthians	Romans
243 CE	Battle of Resaena Part of the Roman–Persian Wars	Romans	Persians
Winter of 244 CE	Battle of Misiche Part of the Roman–Persian Wars	Persians	Romans
252 CE	Battle of Barbalissos Part of the Roman–Persian Wars	Persians	Romans
Spring 260 CE	Battle of Edessa Part of the Roman–Persian Wars	Persians	Romans

- 217–502 Roman–Sassanid wars
  - 240 – 241: Fall of Hatra
  - 263 Battle of Ctesiphon
  - 298 Battle of Satala
  - 344 Battle of Singara
  - 359 Siege of Amida
  - 360 Siege of Singara
  - April 27–29, 363 Siege of Pirisabora
  - May 29, 363 Battle of Ctesiphon
  - June 363 Battle of Samarra
- Julian's Persian expedition (Roman–Persian Wars):
  - 363: Siege of Maiozamalcha, Battle of Ctesiphon (363), Battle of Maranga, battle of Samarra
- 502–628 Byzantine–Sasanian wars
  - 502–506 Anastasian War
  - 526–532 Iberian War
  - 572–591 Byzantine–Sasanian War
  - c. 602 – c. 628 Byzantine–Sasanian War: Battle of Nineveh (627)
- 633–651 Muslim conquest of Persia
  - 633 Battle of Ayn al-Tamr, Battle of al-Anbar, Battle of Husayd
  - April 633 Battle of River
  - May 633 Battle of Walaja
  - May 633 Battle of Ullais
  - May 633 Battle of Hira
  - November 633 Battle of Muzayyah
  - November 633 Battle of Saniyy
  - November 633 Battle of Zumail
  - 634 Battle of Namaraq, Battle of Kaskar
  - c. January 634 Battle of Firaz
  - May 634 Battle of Babylon
  - October 634 Battle of the Bridge
  - April 635 Battle of Buwaib
  - 636 Battle of Burs
  - November 16–19, 636 Battle of al-Qādisiyyah
  - January–March 637 Siege of Ctesiphon
  - April 637 Battle of Jalula

== Medieval times (651–1517) ==
Approximated dates	Name of conflict	Belligerents	
Approximated dates	Name of conflict	Victorious parties (if applicable)	Defeated parties (if applicable)
8 December 656	Battle of the Camel Part of the First Islamic Civil War	Forces of Ali	Forces of Aisha
17 July 658	Battle of Nahrawan Part of the First Islamic Civil War	Rashidun caliphate	Kharijites
10 October 680	Battle of Karbala Part of the Second Islamic Civil War	Umayyad caliphate	Husayn ibn Ali and his partisans
Mid-October 691	Battle of Maskin Part of the Second Islamic Civil War	Umayyad caliphate	Zubayrid Caliphate
744–750	Third Islamic Civil War	Abbasid caliphate	Umayyad caliphate; Alids; Kharijites
25 January 750	Battle of the Zab Part of the Abbasid Revolution	Abbasid caliphate	Umayyad caliphate
September 762 – February 763	Alid Revolt	Abbasid caliphate	Alids
August 812 – 28 September 813	Siege of Baghdad Part of the Fourth Islamic Civil War	Forces of al-Ma'mun	Forces of al-Amin

- 861–870 Anarchy at Samarra
- 865–866: Abbasid civil war, Siege of Baghdad (865)
- 869–883: Zanj Rebellion, Battle of the Barges (869), battle of Basra (871)
- Battle of Dayr al-Aqul - 876
- Qarmatian—Abbasid wars: Sack of Basra (923)
- 927: Qarmatian invasion of Iraq
- 942: Battle of al-Mada'in
- Buyid–Hamdanid Wars
  - April–August 946 Battle of Baghdad
- Battle of Sinjar - 1057
- Battle of Khabur River - 1107
- Abbasid–Seljuq Wars
  - Siege of Baghdad (1136)
  - January 12 – July 3, 1157 CE Siege of Baghdad
- 1206–1368 Mongol invasions and conquests
  - c. 29 January – c. 10 February 1258 Siege of Baghdad

== Modern times (1517–present) ==
=== Ottoman empire (1517–1917) ===
- 1514–1823 Ottoman–Persian Wars
  - 1532–1555 Ottoman–Safavid War
    - December 1534 Capture of Baghdad
  - 1623–1639 Ottoman–Safavid War
    - January 14, 1624 Capture of Baghdad
    - November 15 – December 25, 1638 Siege of Baghdad
  - Nader Shah's Mesopotamian campaign (1732–1733)
    - Siege of Baghdad (1733)
    - Battle of Samarra (1733)
    - Battle of Kirkuk (1733)
  - 1802: Wahhabi sack of Karbala
- July 28, 1914 – November 11, 1918 World War I
  - October 29, 1914 – October 30, 1918 Middle Eastern theatre of World War I
    - November 6, 1914 – 14 November 14, 1918 Mesopotamian campaign
      - November 6–8, 1914 Fao Landing
      - November 11–22, 1914 Battle of Basra
      - December 3–9, 1914 Battle of Qurna
      - April 12–14, 1915 Battle of Shaiba
      - September 28, 1915 Battle of Es Sinn
      - November 22–25, 1915 Battle of Ctesiphon
      - December 7, 1915 – April 29, 1916 Siege of Kut
      - January 6|January 8, 1916 Battle of Sheikh Sa'ad
      - January 13, 1916 Battle of Wadi
      - January 21, 1916 Battle of Hanna
      - March 8, 1916 Battle of Dujaila
      - March 8–11, 1917 Fall of Baghdad
      - February 23, 1917 Second Battle of Kut
      - September 28–29, 1917 Battle of Ramadi
      - March 26–27, 1918 Action of Khan Baghdadi
      - October 23–30, 1918 Battle of Sharqat
- 1918–2003 Iraqi–Kurdish conflict

=== Occupied Enemy Territory Administration (1917–1920) ===
- May–October 1920 Iraqi Revolt

=== Kingdom of Iraq (1932–1958) ===
- September 1, 1939 – September 2, 1945 World War II
  - June 10, 1940 – May 2, 1945 Mediterranean and Middle East theatre of World War II
    - May 2–31, 1941 Anglo-Iraqi War
      - April 1, 1941 Iraq coup
- 1918–2003 Iraqi–Kurdish conflict
  - November 1922 – July 1924 Mahmud Barzanji revolts
  - 1931–1932 Ahmed Barzani revolt
  - 1943 – October 1945 Barzani revolt

=== Ba'athist Iraq (1968–2003) ===
  - September 11, 1961–1970 First Kurdish–Iraqi War
  - April 1974 – Mid 1975 Second Kurdish–Iraqi War
  - 1975–1983 PUK insurgency
  - September 1983 – September 1988 Kurdish Rebellion
  - May 1994 – November 24, 1997 Iraqi Kurdish Civil War
- September 22, 1980 – August 20, 1988 Iran–Iraq War
  - 1980 Iraqi invasion
    - September 23, 1980 Operation Kaman 99
    - October 29, 1980 Operation Sultan 10
    - September 30, 1980 Operation Scorch Sword
    - November 28–29, 1980 Operation Morvarid
  - 1981 Stalemate
    - April 4, 1981 Attack on H3
  - 1982 Iranian offensive
    - Early July 1982 Operation Ramadan
  - 1983–1985 Strategic stalemate
    - February 6–26, 1983 Operation Before the Dawn
    - April 10, 1983 Operation Dawn 1
    - July 22, 1983 Operation Dawn 2
    - July 30 – August 9, 1983 Operation Dawn 3
    - October 19 – mid-November 1983 Operation Dawn 4
    - Early 1984 Operation Dawn 5
    - February 14 – March 19, 1984 Operation Kheibar
    - February 22–24, 1984 Operation Dawn 6
    - 1984 Battle of the Marshes
    - March 10–20, 1985 Operation Badr
  - 1986–1987 Duel offensives
    - 1986–1989 Al-Anfal Campaign
    - March 16, 1988 Halabja poison gas attack
    - February 9–25, 1986 Operation Dawn 8
    - February 11, 1986 First Battle of al-Faw
    - December 25–27 December 1986 Operation Karbala-4
    - January 8 – February 26, 1987 Operation Karbala-5
    - Early 1987 Operation Karbala-6
    - May 1987 Operation Karbala 10
    - May – early June 1987 Operation Nasr 4
  - 1988 Final stages
    - Mid-March 1988 Operation Zafar 7
    - April 17, 1988 Second Battle of al-Faw
  - 1981 International incidents
    - June 7, 1981 Operation Opera
- August 2, 1990 – February 28, 1991 Second Persian Gulf War
  - 1991 Operation Desert Storm
    - February 15–20, 1991 Battle of Wadi al-Batin
  - January 17 – February 23, 1991 Gulf War air campaign
    - January 19, 1991 Package Q Strike
    - February 13, 1991 4:30 am (GMT+3) Amiriyah shelter bombing
  - February 24–28, 1991 Liberation of Kuwait campaign
    - February 26–27, 1991 Battle of 73 Easting
    - February 26, 1991 Battle of Phase Line Bullet
    - February 27, 1991 Battle of Medina Ridge
    - February 27, 1991 Battle for Jalibah Airfield
    - February 27, 1991 Battle of Norfolk
    - March 2, 1991 Battle of Rumaila
    - March 1, 1991 Safwan Airfield Standoff
- March 1 – April 5, 1991 Uprisings in Iraq
  - March 1 – mid-April 1991 Uprising in Basra
  - March 5–19, 1991 Uprising in Karbala
  - March 5 – April 3, 1991 Uprising in Sulaymaniyah
  - March 11–29, 1991 Uprising in Kirkuk
  - March 10–24, 1991 Uprising in Tuz Khormato
- 1991–2002 Air engagements of the Post Gulf War
- September 3, 1996 Operation Desert Strike
- December 16–19, 1998 Operation Desert Fox
- March 20, 2003 – December 15, 2011 Iraq War
  - March 19 – May 1, 2003 Invasion of Iraq
    - March 21–25, 2003 Battle of Umm Qasr
    - March 20–24, 2003 Battle of Al Faw
    - March 21 – April 6, 2003 Battle of Basra
    - March 23–29, 2003 Battle of Nasiriyah
    - March 24, 2003 Attack on Karbala
    - March 24 – April 4, 2003 Battle of Najaf
    - March 26, 2003 – Operation Northern Delay
    - March 28–30, 2003 Operation Viking Hammer
    - March 30 – April 4, 2003 Battle of Samawah
    - March 31 – April 6, 2003 Battle of Karbala
    - April 2–April 4, 2003 Battle of the Karbala Gap
    - April 3–12, 2003 Battle of Baghdad
    - April 6, 2003 Battle of Debecka Pass

=== Coalition Provisional Authority (2003–2004) ===
- 2003–2004 Post-invasion insurgency
  - March 20, 2003 – December 7, 2011 Iraq War in Anbar Province
  - October 26 – November 24, 2003 Ramadan Offensive
  - December 13, 2003 Operation Red Dawn
  - April 4 – June 24, 2004 Iraq spring fighting
  - April 4 – May 1, 2004 First Battle of Fallujah
  - April 4 – May 11, 2008 Siege of Sadr City
  - April 6–10, 2004 Battle of Ramadi
  - April 17, 2004 Battle of Husaybah
  - August 5–27, 2004 Battle of Najaf
  - August 5–28, 2004 CIMIC-House
  - October 1–3, 2004 Battle of Samarra
  - November 7 – December 23, 2004 Second Battle of Fallujah
  - November 8–16, 2004 Battle of Mosul

=== Republic of Iraq (2005–present) ===
- 2005–2006 Post-invasion insurgency
  - May 8–19, 2005 Battle of Al Qaim
  - August 1–4, 2005 Battle of Haditha
  - September 1–18, 2005 Battle of Tal Afar
  - June 17 – November 15, 2006 Battle of Ramadi
  - August 28, 2006 Battle of Diwaniya
- February 2006 – May 2008 Civil war in Iraq
  - September 23 – October 22, 2006 Ramadan Offensive
  - September 27, 2006 – February 18, 2007 Operation Sinbad
  - October 19–20, 2006 Battle of Amarah
  - November 15–16, 2006 Battle of Turki
  - December 25, 2006 – October 1, 2007 Diyala campaign
  - January 6–9, 2007 Battle of Haifa Street
  - January 20, 2007 Karbala provincial headquarters raid
  - January 28–29, 2007 Battle of Najaf
  - February 14 – November 24, 2007 Operation Imposing Law
  - February 27 – September 3, 2007 Siege of U.K. bases in Basra
  - April 6–10, 2007 Operation Black Eagle
  - June 16 – August 14, 2007 Operation Phantom Thunder
  - March 10 – August 19, 2007 Battle of Baqubah
  - June 30 – July 1, 2007 Battle of Donkey Island
  - February 15, 2007 Operation Shurta Nasir
  - August 27–29, 2007 Battle of Karbala
  - January 8 – July 28, 2008 Operation Phantom Phoenix
  - January 18–19, 2008 Iraqi Day of Ashura fighting
  - January 23 – July 28, 2008 Ninawa campaign
  - March 25 – May 15, 2008 Iraq spring fighting
  - March 25–31, 2008 Battle of Basra
  - April 15 – May 19, 2008 Al-Qaeda offensive in Iraq
- March 15, 2011 – present Arab Winter
  - 2011–present Spillover of the Syrian Civil War
    - December 18, 2011 – December 31, 2013 Iraqi insurgency
      - January 2014 – December 2017 War in Iraq (2013–2017)
        - August 1–19, 2014 Northern Iraq offensive
          - June 16, 2014 – December 31, 2021 American intervention in Iraq
            - August 3–14, 2014 Sinjar massacre

== See also ==
- List of wars involving Iraq
- Iraqi Army
- Iraqi Navy
- Iraqi Air Force
- Iraqi Armed Forces
- Iraqi Special Operations Forces
- Military history of Iraq
