= Ramadan Offensive =

Ramadan Offensive may refer to:

- Ramadan Offensive (1963), during the 1962–1970 North Yemen Civil War
- Ramadan Offensive (2003), insurgent offensive during Ramadan that started the mass insurgency in the Iraq War
- Ramadan Offensive (2006), insurgent offensive during Ramadan in the Iraq War
- Ramadan Offensive (2010), the August 2010 offensive that sparked the Battle of Mogadishu (2010–2011)
- Ramadan Offensive (2011), or, Ramadan Massacre, an operation by government forces in the 2011 Siege of Hama, part of the 2011–2012 Syrian Revolution, that started the 2011–2024 Syrian Civil War

== See also ==
- Operation Ramadan (1982), Iranian offensive during the Iran-Iraq War
- Operation Ramadan (2025), or, 2025 Shabelle offensive, an al-Shabaab attack on the government of Somalia
- Ramadan War (disambiguation)
- Offensive (disambiguation)
- Ramadan (disambiguation)
