= Ramadan (disambiguation) =

Ramadan is a Muslim religious observance.

Ramadan may also refer to:

- Ramadan (calendar month), a month of the Islamic calendar

== Music ==
- Ramadan (album), 2000 album by ee

== Places ==
- Ramadan, Iran, a village in Iran
- 10th of Ramadan (city), a city in Egypt
- Ramzan Nagar, a village and union council in Bangladesh

== People ==
- Ramadan (name), a surname and given name (and list of people with the name)
- Ramadan, a minor Kazakh Jüz horde
- Ramadan (Muradid bey), Bey of Tunis
- Ramadan (14th-century ruler) (died before June 1354), first beg of the Ramadanid Emirate

== Military history ==
- Ramadan Revolution, a 1962 military coup by the Ba'ath Party's Iraqi-wing which overthrew the Prime Minister of Iraq, Abd al-Karim Qasim
- Yom Kippur War, also referred to as "Ramadan war"
- Ramadan Offensive (2003), series of insurgent attacks against Coalition and Iraqi military targets from the end of October and during much of November 2003
- Ramadan Offensive (2006), attacks mounted by insurgents in Iraq during the holy Muslim month of Ramadan in 2006

== See also ==
- Ramdan (disambiguation)
- Ramazan (disambiguation)
- Ramzan (disambiguation)
- Ramadhani, a name
- Ramdhanu, a 2014 Indian film
