= Mohammad Ramzan =

Mohammad or Muhammad Ramzan may refer to:

- Mohammad Ramzan (cricketer), former Pakistani Test cricketer
- Muhammad Ramzan (preacher), founder of Dawat-e-Islami
- Muhammad Ramzan (swimmer), Pakistani Olympic swimmer
- Muhammad Ramzan Ali, Pakistani athlete
- Muhammad Ramzan Sr., Pakistani football defender
- Muhammad Ramzan Jr., Pakistani football goalkeeper

== See also ==
- Ramzan
- Muhammad (name)
