= Japan–Turkey relations =

- Japan: Turkey

Diplomatic mission
- Embassy of Japan, Ankara: Turkish Embassy, Tokyo

Envoy
- Ambassador Katsumata Takahiko: Ambassador Oğuzhan Ertuğrul

Japan–Turkey relations (Japanese: 日本とトルコの関係, romanized: Nihon to Toruko no Kankei; Turkish: Japonya-Türkiye ilişkileri) are foreign relations between Japan and Turkey. Japan has an embassy in Ankara and a consulate-general in Istanbul. Turkey has an embassy in Tokyo and a consulate-general in Nagoya. The relationship has been described as "close".

== History ==
=== Ottoman Empire ===
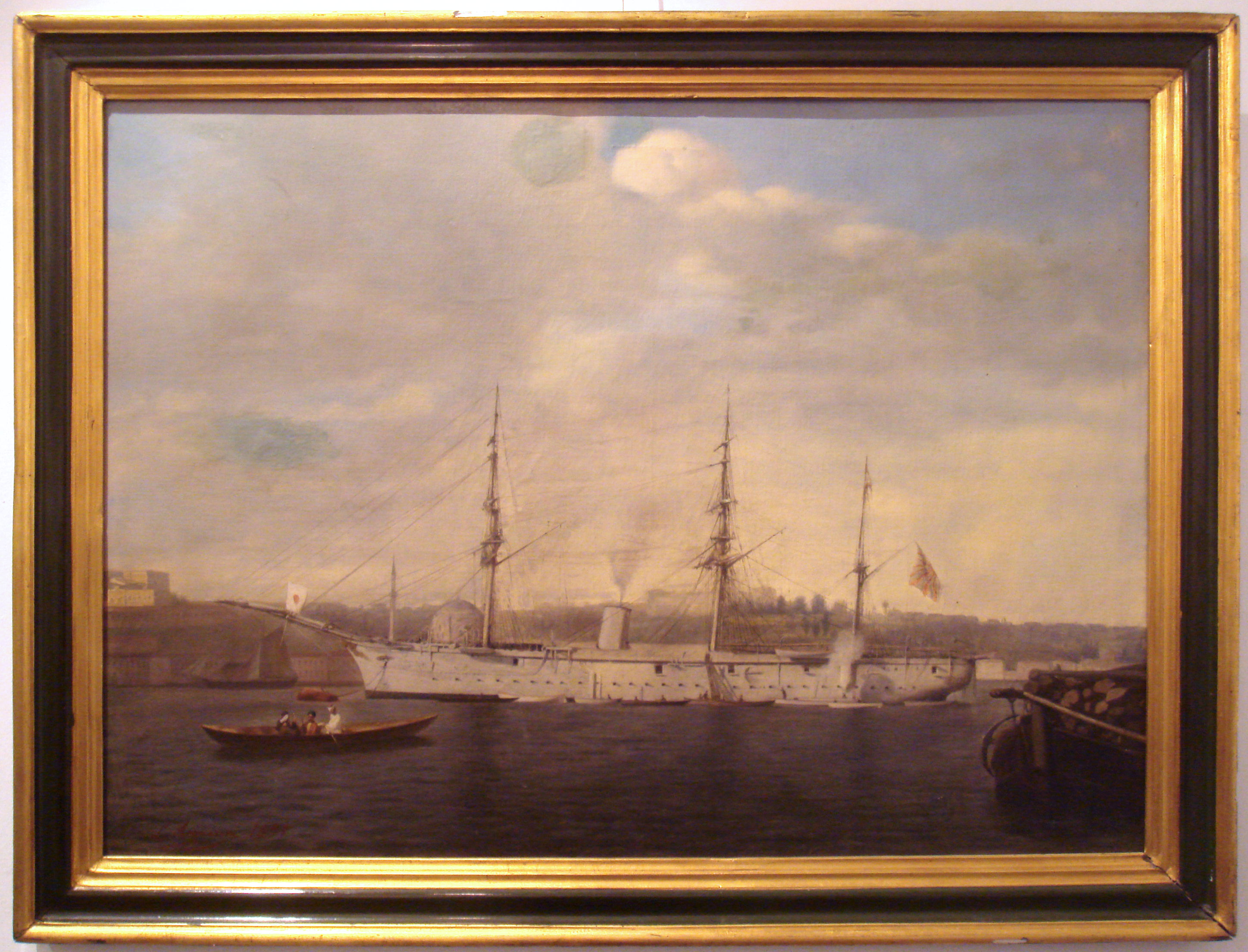
The Japanese cruiser Kongō in Istanbul, 1891, following the Ertuğrul incident, by Luigi Acquarone (1800–1896).

Relations between the two countries started in the 19th century. From the 1870s, very few Japanese, only civil servants and officials, had visited the Ottoman Empire. A foundational event occurred in 1890, when the Turkish frigate Ertuğrul hit a reef and sank off the coast of Wakayama, Japan, after having an audience with the Meiji Emperor. The head of the delegation, Ali Osman Pasha, was received by Emperor Meiji, and presented a letter and medal sent by Abdulhamid II to the emperor. The surviving sailors were taken back to Istanbul by two Japanese corvettes, the Kongo and Hiej. A monument commemorating the Ottoman sailors was erected in Kushimoto of Wakayama Prefecture, called the Kushimoto Turkish Memorial and Museum. In 2015, the movie "125 Years Memory" was released, marking the 125th anniversary of friendship between Japan and Turkey. The motion picture reflects two important historical incidents in Japanese-Turkish relations, the aforementioned sinking of the Ertuğrul and the evacuation of Japanese nationals from Tehran, Iran in 1985.

In the late 19th and early 20th centuries, Nipponophilia took hold of the Ottoman press with hundreds upon hundreds of articles written about Japan. As an Eastern people who originated in Central Asia, many Turks felt a special affinity for another Eastern, Asian nation like Japan, which had modernized without becoming westernized. Further adding to the mutual attraction between the Turks and the Japanese was their shared enmity towards Russia, the archenemy of the Ottomans for centuries and the new archenemy of Japan. Already starting to promote the ideology of Pan-Asianism, the Japanese began to court the Sublime Porte, the central government of the Ottoman Empire. The Meiji Emperor sent princes of the House of Yamato to visit the Sultan-Caliph, Abdul Hamid II, bearing gifts and proposals for treaties and generating much excitement in the Ottoman press. Abdul Hamid II admired Japan to a certain extent but was fearful of the popular rumors that the Meiji Emperor would convert to Islam and proclaim himself Caliph, thereby displacing the Sultan-Caliph as the object of veneration from all the world's Sunni Muslims.

The Committee of Union and Progress (CUP) greatly admired Japan, which they took as their model. The fact that an Asian nation like Japan had defeated Russia in 1905, the traditional enemy of the Ottoman Empire, was very inspiring to the Unionists, and Unionist newspapers all portrayed Japan's victory as a triumph not only over Russia, but also over Western values. The Unionists especially admired the Japanese for their embrace of Western science and technology without losing their "Eastern spiritual essence", which was seen as proving that one could modernize without embracing Western values, providing the inspiration to make the Ottoman Empire into the "Japan of the Near East". The Turks originated as a people living north of the Great Wall of China, with the first mention of the Turks in history occurring in a letter written to the Chinese emperor Wen in 585 AD. Over the centuries the Turks had wandered across Eurasia, settling in very large numbers in Anatolia after their victory over the Romans at the Battle of Manzikert in 1071. The Unionists were proud of the East Asian origins of the Turkish people, and spent much time glorying Turan, which was the name they had adopted for the homeland of the Turks in East Asia that was located somewhere north of the Great Wall of China. As the Chinese and Arabs were the traditional enemies of the Turks, there no ties of friendship to celebrate with those peoples. Ziya Gökalp, the chief ideologue of the Young Turks charged in a 1913 essay that "the sword of the Turk and likewise his pen have exalted the Arabs, the Chinese and the Persians" rather than themselves and that the modern Turks "needed to turn back to their ancient past". Gökalp argued it was time for the Turks to once again study the important figures of their own Turco-Mongol tradition, such as Attila the Hun, Genghis Khan, Timur, and Hulagu Khan.

The modernization policies carried out by the Unionist regime starting in 1908 after the Young Turk revolution were closely modeled after the modernization of Meiji Japan. One Unionist, Colonel Pertev Bey wrote after the revolution of 1908: "We will rise shortly... with the same brilliance as the Rising Sun of the Far East did a few years ago! In any case, let us not forget that a nation always rises from its own strength!". In an inversion of Western paranoia about the "Yellow Peril", the Young Turks often fantasised about creating an alliance with Japan that would unite all the peoples of "the East" to wage war against the much hated Western nations that dominated the world, a "Yellow wave" that would wash away European civilisation for good. For the Young Turks, the term yellow (which was in fact a derogatory Western term for East Asians, based upon their perceived skin colour) stood for the "Eastern gold", the innate moral superiority of Eastern peoples over the corrupt West. In the eyes of the Unionists, it was the civilisations of the Middle East, the Indian subcontinent, and the Far East that were the superior civilisations to Western civilisation, and it was merely an unfortunate accident of history that the West had happened to become more economically and technologically advanced than the Asian civilisations, something that they were determined to correct. The Young Turks were very impressed with how the Japanese had fought the Russian-Japanese war, observing that because of Bushido ("the way of the warrior"), the fierce warrior code of the samurai, that all Japanese males were indoctrinated in after the Meiji Restoration that the Japanese had no fear of death as for them it was the greatest honor to die for the Emperor while the Russians were afraid to die and did not know why they were fighting in Manchuria, thus giving the Japanese the edge in combat. The Unionists intended to emulate the Japanese example by creating a militaristic educational system designed to make every man a soldier and every woman into essentially a soldier-making machine; the concept of jihad would play the same role in motivating the Turkish soldier to fight and die for the caliph (regarded as Allah's representative on the Earth) as Bushido did for the Japanese soldier to die for his emperor (regarded by the Japanese as a living god). From the Meiji Restoration to 1945, Japanese students were taught that Bushido was the highest moral code, that for a man it was the greatest honor to die for the Emperor while for a woman it was the greatest honor to bear sons who would die for the Emperor. As with the case of the oligarchy that ruled Meiji Japan, the purpose of the modernization policies of the CUP regime to allow the nation to win wars, and the educational policies of the CUP regime, which were closely modeled after the Japanese educational system, were meant to train the male students to be soldiers when they become adults. The Turkish historian Handan Nezir Akmeșe wrote that the most important factor in Unionist thinking was the "devaluation of life", the belief that Eastern peoples like the Japanese and the Turks attached no value to human life including their own, and unlike the Westerners who allegedly clung pathetically to their lives when confronted with danger, Easterners supposedly died willingly and happily for the cause.

Efforts to establish treaty relations between Japan and the Ottoman Empire failed because of Japan's insistence that it receive capitulations like the other Great Powers and the Empire's demand that the two countries negotiate only as absolute equals. During World War I, Japan was one of the Allies while the Turkish Ottoman Empire was one of the Central Powers.

Ottoman–Japanese Trade
Years	Ottoman Exports to Japan (yen)^{1 yen= 12 kurush}	Ottoman Imports
1902	1.189	41.860
1905	342.389	50.632
1907	130.394	70.598
1910	944.824	81.166
1912	138.665	162.675

=== Republic of Turkey ===
Following the founding of the Republic of Turkey, diplomatic relations were established in 1924 and first embassies were opened in 1925. The first Japanese ambassador to Turkey was Sadatsuchi Uchida, who later in 1926 proposed and established the Japan-Turkey Society, a non-profit organization aiming mutual exchange between Turkey and Japan.

During the 1930s, Japan engaged in a secret attempt to create an Islamic state in Central Asia with Japanese backing, with the Ottoman Crown Prince Şehzade Mehmed Abdülkerim as its Sultan at the Kumul Rebellion. The plot failed to materialise.

While Turkey had declared war on Japan in February 1945, it was also entirely symbolic. So in 1985, the almost century old gesture of kindness was reciprocated during the Iran–Iraq War. As hostilities escalated to an extent that all aircraft were threatened with being shot-down, Turkey sent an aircraft in to rescue 215 Japanese nationals who were living in Tehran at the time. The Turkish government issued a statement: "We have not forgotten the rescue of the sailors of the Ertuğrul. Thus, once we heard there were Japanese citizens in need of help, we went to their rescue."

2010 marked the 120th anniversary of Turko-Japanese relations with over 186 events held throughout Turkey during the year. In this year, Turkey held the "Japan Year 2010 in Turkey." On July 10, 2010, Prince Tomohito of Mikasa, cousin of the emperor, attended the opening ceremony of the Kaman Kalehöyük Archaeological Museum. The museum was built with funding from Japan. The prince has often engaged himself actively to promote Japanese-Turkish relations. Moreover, in the wake of Great East Japan earthquake in March 2011 and the earthquakes in Turkey's eastern part in October and November 2011 respectively, both countries provided each other with support, which strengthened the relationship between the two nationals.

The year 2019 is the "Turkey Year" in Japan.

== Political relations ==
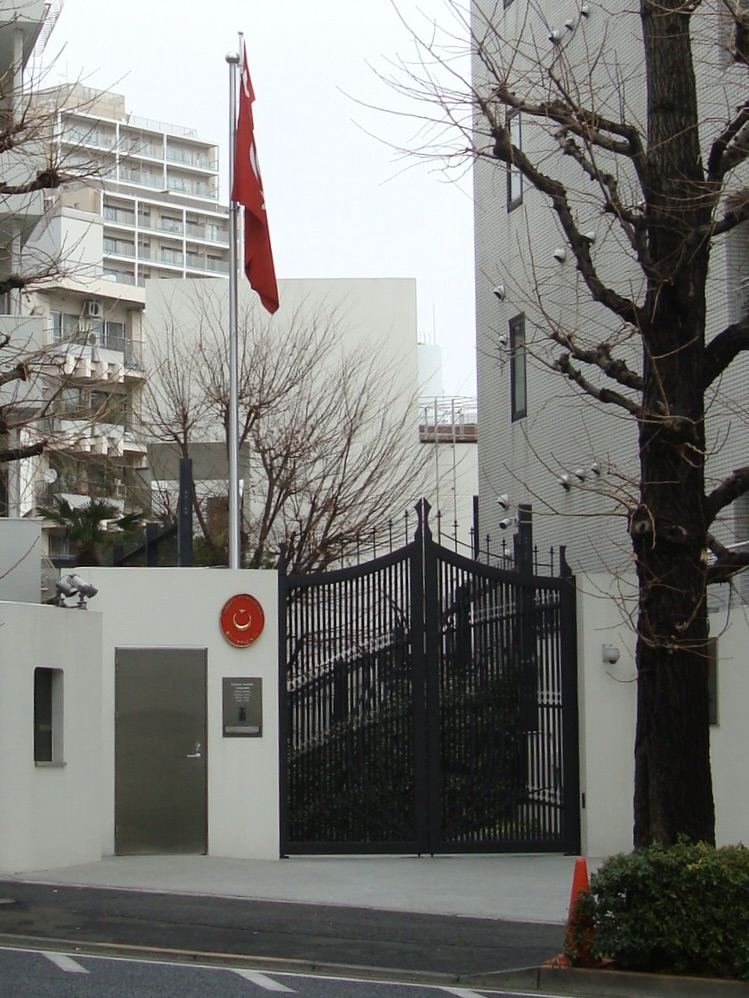
Embassy of Turkey in Japan

Turkey and Japan are both members of the Organisation for Economic Co-operation and Development (OECD), G20 and the World Trade Organization (WTO). Also Turkey is a member of the Council of Europe, and the Organization for Security and Co-operation in Europe (OSCE), and Japan is an observer.

There are 4,444 (2010) Turkish citizens living in Japan, constituting an important aspect of Turkey's relations with Japan.

The Japan-Turkey Society was established in 1926 and has since been promoting amicable relations between Japan and Turkey through seminars, the arts, language and cultural exchange and even culinary exchange activities.

The Turkey-Japan Cultural Dialog Society was founded in 2006, but records cultural and other types of exchange activities between Japan and Turkey since 1873.

According to the public survey in Turkey conducted by the Japanese Foreign Ministry in 2012, 83.2% of respondents answered that the relations between Japan and Turkey are "friendly" or "almost friendly".

Japan criticized the 2019 Turkish offensive into north-eastern Syria. Foreign minister, Toshimitsu Motegi, said in a statement: "Japan is deeply concerned that the latest military operation would make the settlement of Syrian crisis more difficult and cause further deterioration of the humanitarian situation. Japan once again underscores its position that the Syrian crisis cannot be solved by any military means."

Both countries cooperated during the escape of the former Nissan executive Carlos Ghosn.

== High-level Visits ==
Guest	Host	Place of visit	Date of visit
(Japan) Prince Tomohito of Mikasa	(Turkey) President Turgut Özal	Çankaya Köşkü, Ankara	1990
(Japan) Prince Tomohito of Mikasa	(Turkey) President Süleyman Demirel	Ankara	April 1998
(Japan) Princess Akiko of Mikasa	(Turkey) President Süleyman Demirel	Kaman-Kalehöyük, Turkey	July 1998
(Turkey) Minister of Foreign Affairs İsmail Cem	(Japan) Prime Minister Keizō Obuchi	Kantei, Tokyo	April, 2000
(Japan) Prince Tomohito of Mikasa	(Turkey) President Ahmet Necdet Sezer	Turkey	October 2003
(Japan) Prince Tomohito of Mikasa	(Turkey) President Ahmet Necdet Sezer	Turkey	October 2003
(Turkey) Minister of Foreign Affairs Abdullah Gül	(Japan) Prime Minister Junichiro Koizumi	Kantei, Tokyo	December, 2003
(Japan) Prince Tomohito of Mikasa	(Turkey) President Ahmet Necdet Sezer	Çankaya Köşkü, Ankara	2004
(Turkey) Prime Minister Recep Tayyip Erdoğan	(Japan) Prime Minister Junichiro Koizumi	Kantei, Tokyo and Osaka	April 11–15, 2004
(Japan) Prince Tomohito of Mikasa, Princess Akiko of Mikasa	(Turkey) President Ahmet Necdet Sezer	Çankaya Köşkü, Ankara	September 2005
(Japan) Prime Minister Junichiro Koizumi	(Turkey) President Ahmet Necdet Sezer	Çankaya Köşkü, Ankara	2006
(Japan) Princess Akiko of Mikasa	(Turkey) President Abdullah Gül	Çankaya Köşkü, Ankara	2008
(Turkey) President Abdullah Gül	(Japan) Prime Minister Yasuo Fukuda or Tarō Asō	Kantei, Tokyo	2008
(Japan) Crown Prince Naruhito	(Turkey) President Abdullah Gül	Çankaya Köşkü, Ankara	2009
(Japan) Minister of Foreign Affairs Katsuya Okada	(Turkey) President Abdullah Gül	Çankaya Köşkü, Ankara	January 2010
(Japan) Prince Tomohito of Mikasa	(Turkey) President Abdullah Gül	Çankaya Köşkü, Ankara	May 2010
(Japan) Prince Tomohito of Mikasa, Princess Akiko of Mikasa	(Turkey) President Abdullah Gül	Çankaya Köşkü, Ankara	July 2010
(Turkey) Deputy Prime Minister Ali Babacan	(Japan) Prime Minister Naoto Kan	Kantei, Tokyo	December 2010
(Turkey) Deputy Prime Minister Ali Babacan	(Japan) Prime Minister Yoshihiko Noda	Kantei, Tokyo and Sendai	December 5–7, 2011
(Japan) Minister of Foreign Affairs Koichiro Gemba	(Turkey) President Abdullah Gül	Çankaya Köşkü, Ankara	January 6, 2012
(Japan) Minister of Foreign Affairs Koichiro Gemba	(Turkey) President Abdullah Gül	Çankaya Köşkü, Ankara	June 2012
(Turkey) Deputy Prime Minister Ali Babacan	(Japan) Prime Minister Yoshihiko Noda	Kantei, Tokyo	October 2012
(Japan) Prime Minister Shinzo Abe	(Turkey) President Abdullah Gül	Çankaya Köşkü, Ankara	May 2013
(Japan) Prime Minister Shinzo Abe	(Turkey) President Abdullah Gül	Çankaya Köşkü, Ankara	October 2013
(Turkey) Prime Minister Recep Tayyip Erdoğan	(Japan) Prime Minister Shinzo Abe	Kantei, Tokyo	January 6–8, 2014
(Japan) Princess Akiko of Mikasa	(Turkey) President Abdullah Gül	Çankaya Köşkü, Ankara	April 2014
(Turkey) Minister of Foreign Affairs Ahmet Davutoğlu	(Japan) Prime Minister Shinzo Abe	Kantei, Tokyo	April, 2014
(Japan) Deputy Prime Minister Tarō Asō	(Turkey) President Recep Tayyip Erdoğan	Çankaya Köşkü, Ankara	February 2015
(Turkey) Deputy Prime Minister Numan Kurtulmuş	(Japan) Prime Minister Shinzo Abe	Kantei, Tokyo	March 2015
(Japan) Deputy Prime Minister Tarō Asō	(Turkey) President Recep Tayyip Erdoğan	Çankaya Köşkü, Ankara	September 2015
(Turkey) President Recep Tayyip Erdoğan	(Japan) Prime Minister Shinzo Abe	Kantei, Tokyo	October 7, 2015
(Japan) Prime Minister Shinzo Abe	(Turkey) President Recep Tayyip Erdoğan	Çankaya Köşkü, Ankara	November 2015
(Japan) Deputy Prime Minister Tarō Asō	(Turkey) President Recep Tayyip Erdoğan	Çankaya Köşkü, Ankara	November 2015
(Turkey) Deputy Prime Minister Mehmet Şimşek	(Japan) Prime Minister Shinzo Abe	Kantei, Tokyo	August 2016
(Japan) Princess Akiko of Mikasa	(Turkey) President Recep Tayyip Erdoğan	Presidential Complex, Turkey	September 2018
(Turkey) President Recep Tayyip Erdoğan	(Japan) Prime Minister Shinzo Abe	G20 Summit, Osaka	June 27–29, 2019

== See also ==
- Foreign relations of Japan
- Foreign relations of Turkey
- Japanese people in Turkey
- Turks in Japan
- 125 Years Memory, a 2015 Japanese-Turkish drama film commemorating Japanese-Turkish friendship
- Altaic languages
- Turanism
