= Desert Storm (disambiguation) =

Desert Storm is a codename for the Gulf War (1990–1991), a war against Iraq by a U.S.-led coalition, following Iraq's invasion of Kuwait.

Desert Storm may also refer to:

- Dust storm, a meteorological phenomenon that is common in desert regions
- Desert Storm (roller coaster), a double looping roller coaster located at Castles N' Coasters, in Phoenix, Arizona
- "Desert Storm" (Sliders), an episode of the television series Sliders
- Desert Storm Records, an American record label founded in 1998
- Operation: Desert Storm (video game), a 1991 top-down tank shooter for the Macintosh
- One of two video games in the Conflict series of video games:
  - Conflict: Desert Storm (2002)
  - Conflict: Desert Storm II (2003)
- "Desert Storm", nickname of the centuries scored by Sachin Tendulkar against Australia in the 1997–98 Coca-Cola Cup cricket competition
- Desert Storm syndrome, alternative name for the Gulf War syndrome

== See also ==
- Gulf War (disambiguation)
- Iraq War (disambiguation)
