= Kurdish refugees =

Kurdish Refugee Crisis
- Ethnic persecution, wars, and displacements of the Kurdish population Part of the Iraqi–Kurdish conflict, Kurdish–Turkish conflict, and the Syrian civil war
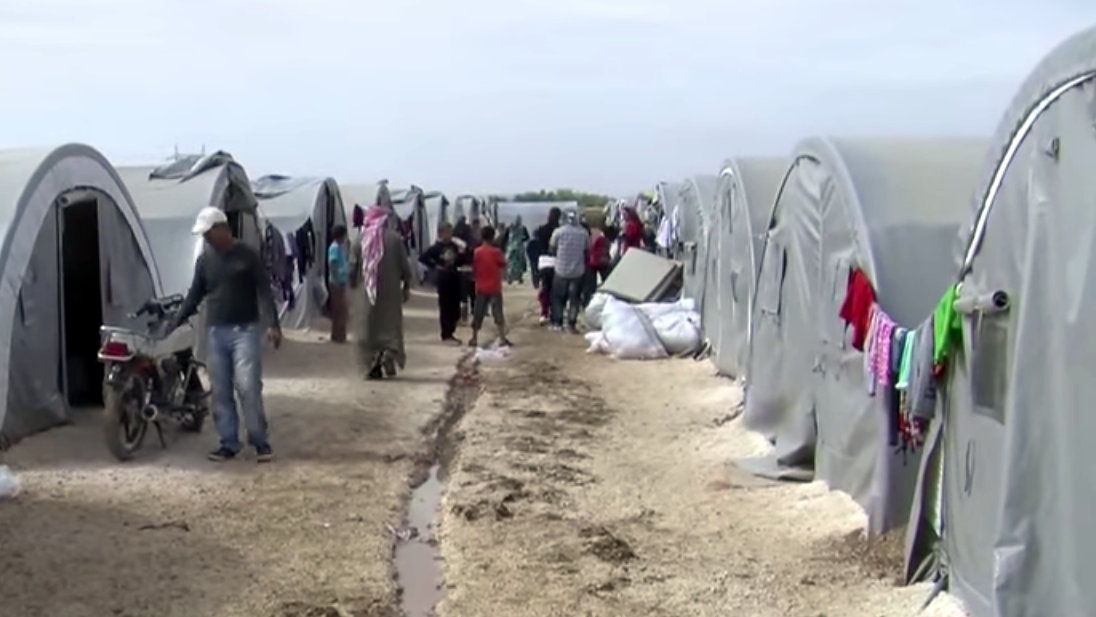
- Kurdish refugees from Kobanî in a refugee camp, on the Turkish side of the Syria–Turkey border
- Date: 20th century–present
- Location: West Asia (Turkey, Iraq, Syria, Iran) and Kurdish diaspora worldwide
- Caused by: Ethnic conflict, state-led persecution, wars, and political uprisings
- Goals: Protection and survival of Kurdish communities; seeking asylum and international recognition
- Methods: Forced displacement, protests, rebellions, and international asylum-seeking
- Status: Ongoing
- Result: Mass displacement of Kurdish populations; formation of refugee camps; international aid efforts

Parties
Kurdish people UNHCR and international aid organizations	Turkey; Iraq; Syria; Iran

Lead figures
Various Kurdish political and military leaders UNHCR personnel and aid workers	Recep Tayyip Erdoğan (President of Turkey); Ahmed al-Sharaa (President of Syria); Former leaders: Bashar al-Assad (President of Syria); Ayatollah Khomeini (Supreme Leader of Iran); Saddam Hussein (President of Iraq, during earlier conflicts)

Number
30+ million Kurds globally	Various military and state forces

Casualties and losses
Tens of thousands of Kurdish civilians killed Aid workers occasionally targeted (numbers unspecified)	Military losses (unknown)

Estimated casualties
- Deaths: 48,400–140,600 (Iraqi–Kurdish conflict of 1991), other conflicts unknown
- Injuries: Widespread; exact numbers unavailable
- Arrested: Thousands of Kurdish activists and civilians
- Damage: Severe damage to Kurdish cities and villages
- Buildings destroyed: Thousands of homes and infrastructure destroyed
- Detained: Mass detentions of Kurdish populations during crackdowns
- Charged: Thousands under terrorism or rebellion-related charges
- Fined: Significant economic losses to displaced communities
- Long-term consequences: Establishment of Kurdish diaspora worldwide; ongoing tensions and humanitarian crises
- The Kurdish refugee crisis remains one of the most protracted and unresolved in modern history.

The problem of Kurdish refugees and displaced people arose in the 20th century in West Asia, and continues today. The Kurds, are an ethnic group mostly inhabiting a region known as Kurdistan, which includes adjacent parts of Iran, Iraq, Syria, and Turkey.

Displacements of Kurds had already been happening within the Ottoman Empire, on the pretext of suppressing Kurdish rebellions, over the period of its domination of the northern Fertile Crescent and the adjacent areas of the Zagros and Taurus Mountains. In the early 20th century, the Christian minorities of the Ottoman Empire suffered genocide (especially during World War I and the Turkish War of Independence), and many Kurds whose tribes were perceived to oppose the Turks were displaced at the same time.

In Iraq, suppression of Kurdish aspirations for autonomy and independence have descended into armed conflict since the 1919 Mahmud Barzanji revolts. Displacement of people became most severe during the Iraqi–Kurdish conflict and the parallel Arabization programs of the Ba'athist regime, which looked to cleanse Iraqi Kurdistan of its Kurdish majority. Tens of thousands of Kurds became displaced and fled the war zones following the First and Second Iraqi–Kurdish War in the 1960s and 1970s. The Iran–Iraq War of the 1980s, the first Gulf War in the early 1990s, and subsequent rebellions altogether created several million primarily Kurdish refugees, who mostly found refuge in Iran, while others dispersed into the Kurdish diaspora in Europe and the Americas. Iran alone provided asylum for 1,400,000 Iraqi refugees, mostly Kurds, who had been uprooted as a result of the first Gulf War (1990–91) and the subsequent rebellions. Today, a large portion of the Kurdish population is composed of displaced Kurdish refugees and their descendants.

== Refugee crises ==
=== Second Kurdish Iraqi War and the Arabization campaign in North Iraq ===
For decades, Saddam Hussein 'Arabized' northern Iraq. Sunni Arabs have driven out at least 70,000 Kurds from the Mosul’s western half. Currently, eastern Mosul is Kurdish and western Mosul is Sunni Arab.

1.5 to 2 million Kurds were forcibly displaced by Arabization campaigns in Iraq between 1963 and 1987; resulting in 10,000 to 100,000 deaths during the displacement. This is not withstanding cases in which Kurds were outright executed such as during the Anfal genocide or other events.

=== Persian Gulf war and consequent rebellions ===
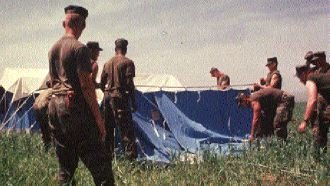
U.S. Marines construct a refugee camp to house Kurdish refugees, 1997

In 1991, when suppression of Kurdish rebellion in the north was initiated by Saddam and massacres of the Kurdish population appeared, Turkey ended being host to 200,000 Iraqi Kurds in a few days. Four days later, 1,500 refugees had died from exposure. One month later, the vast majority of refugees returned to Iraq. Following the 1991 uprising of the Iraqi people against Saddam Hussein, many Kurds were forced to flee the country to become refugees in bordering regions of Iran and Turkey. A northern no-fly zone was established following the First Gulf War in 1991 to facilitate the return of Kurdish refugees.

1.5 million Kurds were displaced during the 1991 Iraqi uprisings with cities like Tuz Khormato having a rate of displacement as high as 90%; at least 48,400 Kurds starved to death due to displacements possibly 140,600.

=== Displacement during the Kurdish–Turkish conflict (1978–present) ===
In total up to 3,000,000 people (mainly Kurds) have been displaced in the Kurdish–Turkish conflict, an estimated 1,000,000 of which were still internally displaced as of 2009.

=== Refugees of Kurdish-Iranian conflict ===
Large-scale confrontations between Iranian military and PJAK resulted also in displacement of Kurdish civilians. By 26 July, more than 50 PJAK fighters and 8 Revolutionary Guards had been killed, and at least 100 PJAK fighters had been wounded according to Iranian sources, while over 800 people had been displaced by the fighting.

=== Moqebleh (Moquoble) refugee camp ===
After the 2004 events in Qamishli, thousands of Kurds fled Syria to the Kurdish Region of Iraq. Local authorities there, the UNHCR and other UN agencies established the Moqebleh camp at a former Army base near Dohuk.

=== Syrian civil war ===
In response to the crisis in Syria, the Kurdish Regional Government and UNHCR established the Domiz Refugee Camp, across the border from Kurdish Syrian territories in the semi-autonomous Iraqi Kurdistan. The camp, which is majority Kurdish, accommodates thousands of Syrian Kurds, offering shelter and medical care. A nearby camp offers men the option of military training, with the intention of protecting Kurdish-held territories in Syria.

==== Kobane crisis ====
As of result of the Kobane crisis in September 2014, most of the Syrian Kurdish population of the Kobane Canton fled into Turkey. More than 300,000 Syrian refugees are estimated to have flowed into Turkey.

== Kurdish diaspora outside West Asia ==
According to a report by the Council of Europe, approximately 1.3 million Kurds live in Western Europe. The earliest immigrants were Kurds from Turkey, who settled in Sweden, Germany, Austria, the Benelux countries, Great Britain, Switzerland, and France during the 1960s. Successive periods of political and social turmoil in the region during the 1980s and 1990s brought new waves of Kurdish refugees, mostly from Iran and Iraq under Saddam Hussein, came to Europe. In recent years, many Kurdish asylum seekers from both Iran and Iraq have settled in the United Kingdom (especially in the town of Dewsbury and in some northern areas of London), which has sometimes caused media controversy over their right to remain. There have been tensions between Kurds and the established Muslim community in Dewsbury, which is home to very traditional mosques such as the Markazi. Since the beginning of the turmoil in Syria many of the refugees of the Syrian Civil War are Syrian Kurds and as a result many of the current Syrian asylum seekers in Germany are of Kurdish descent.

There was substantial immigration of ethnic Kurds in Canada and the United States, who are mainly political refugees and immigrants seeking economic opportunity. According to a 2011 Statistics Canada household survey, there were 11,685 people of Kurdish ethnic background living in Canada, and according to the 2011 Census, more than 10,000 Canadians spoke Kurdish language. In the United States, Kurdish immigrants started to settle in large numbers in Nashville in 1976, which is now home to the largest Kurdish community in the United States and is nicknamed Little Kurdistan. Kurdish population in Nashville is estimated to be around 11,000. Total number of ethnic Kurds residing in the United States is estimated by the US Census Bureau to be around 15,000.

The Japanese government has not granted refugee status to any of the Kurds in Japan who usually file it citing human rights issues and persecution in Turkey and resulted in them living in destitution, with no education and having no legal residency status.

A clash took place outside the Turkish embassy in Tokyo in October 2015 between Kurds and Turks in Japan which began when the Turks assaulted the Kurds after a Kurdish party flag was shown at the embassy.

== Related ethno-religious groups ==
=== Kurdish Jews ===
Almost all of the Kurdish Jews from northern Iraq, estimated at 30,000 in 1950, were evacuated to Israel during Operation Ezra and Nehemiah. Many of these Kurdish Jews self-identified as part of the Kurdish nation, despite their Jewish ethnicity and religion. Some of them continue to identify as Kurds even today. The exodus was part of a broader movement of 150,000 Iraqi and Kurdish Jews who were encouraged to leave Iraq in 1950 by the Iraqi government, which had ultimately ordered the expulsion of Jews who refused to sign a statement renouncing Zionism.

A significant number of Kurdish Jews were part of the larger exodus of Jews from Iran in the 1950s, with only small communities remaining today in Sanandaj and Mahabad. Most of the newly arriving Kurdish Jews were initially housed in Israeli transition camps known as Ma'abarot, which were later incorporated into development towns. These camps provided a temporary solution as Kurdish Jews were integrated into Israeli society.

Today, the Kurdish Jewish community in Israel is estimated at 150,000–200,000 strong and continues to play a significant role in Israeli society, particularly in areas such as culture, politics, and business.

== See also ==
- Timeline of Kurdish uprisings
