= Iraqi invasion =

Iraqi invasion could refer to:

- Iraqi invasion of Iran (1980), which sparked the Iran–Iraq War
- Iraqi invasion of Kuwait (1990), which led to the annexation of Kuwait and later sparked the Gulf War
- Battle of Khafji (1991), Iraqi invasion of Saudi Arabia during the Gulf War

== See also ==
- Invasion of Iraq (disambiguation)
