= Ramadan (name) =

Ramadan (in Arabic رمضان) is a given name and surname. Notable people with the name include:

== Given name ==
- Ramadan Abdel Rehim Mansour (1980–2010), Egyptian street gang leader and serial killer
- Ramadan Agab (born 1986), Sudanese footballer
- Ramadan Asswehly (1879–1920), Libyan-Turkish founder of the Tripolitanian Republic
- Ramadan Boujenah, Libyan politician
- Ramadan Darwish (born 1998), Egyptian judoka
- Ramadan Ragap (born 1979), Egyptian footballer
- Ramadan Shalah (1958–2020), leader of Palestinian Islamic Jihad
- Ramadan Sobhi (born 1997), Egyptian footballer
- Ramadan Sokoli (1920–2008), Albanian musician
- Ramadan Yasser (born 1980), Egyptian boxer

=== Middle name ===
- Mohamed Said Ramadan Al-Bouti (1929–2013), Sunni Muslim scholar
- Ahmed Ramadan Dumbuya, Sierra Leonean former politician
- Mahmoud Ramadan Elattar, Paralympian athlete from Egypt

== Surname ==
- Ammar Ramadan (born 2001), Syrian footballer
- Danny Ramadan (born 1984), Syrian-Canadian novelist and LGBTQ-activist
- Hani Ramadan (born 1959), Swiss Imam, son of Said
- Ibrahim Ramadan (born 1988), Egyptian weightlifter
- Ismet Ramadan (born 1998), Bulgarian footballer
- Mohamed Ramadan (disambiguation), several people
- Moshood Jubril Ramadan, Nigerian religious preacher
- Said Ramadan (1926–1995), Egyptian religious scholar
- Susie Ramadan (born 1979), Australian boxer
- Taha Yassin Ramadan (1938–2007), Iraqi military officer and politician, Vice President of Iraq
- Tariq Ramadan (born 1962), Swiss academic, son of Said
- Yousef Ramadan (born 1992), Egyptian footballer

== See also ==
- Ramadani, an Albanian surname
- Ramzan
