= Yoritaka =

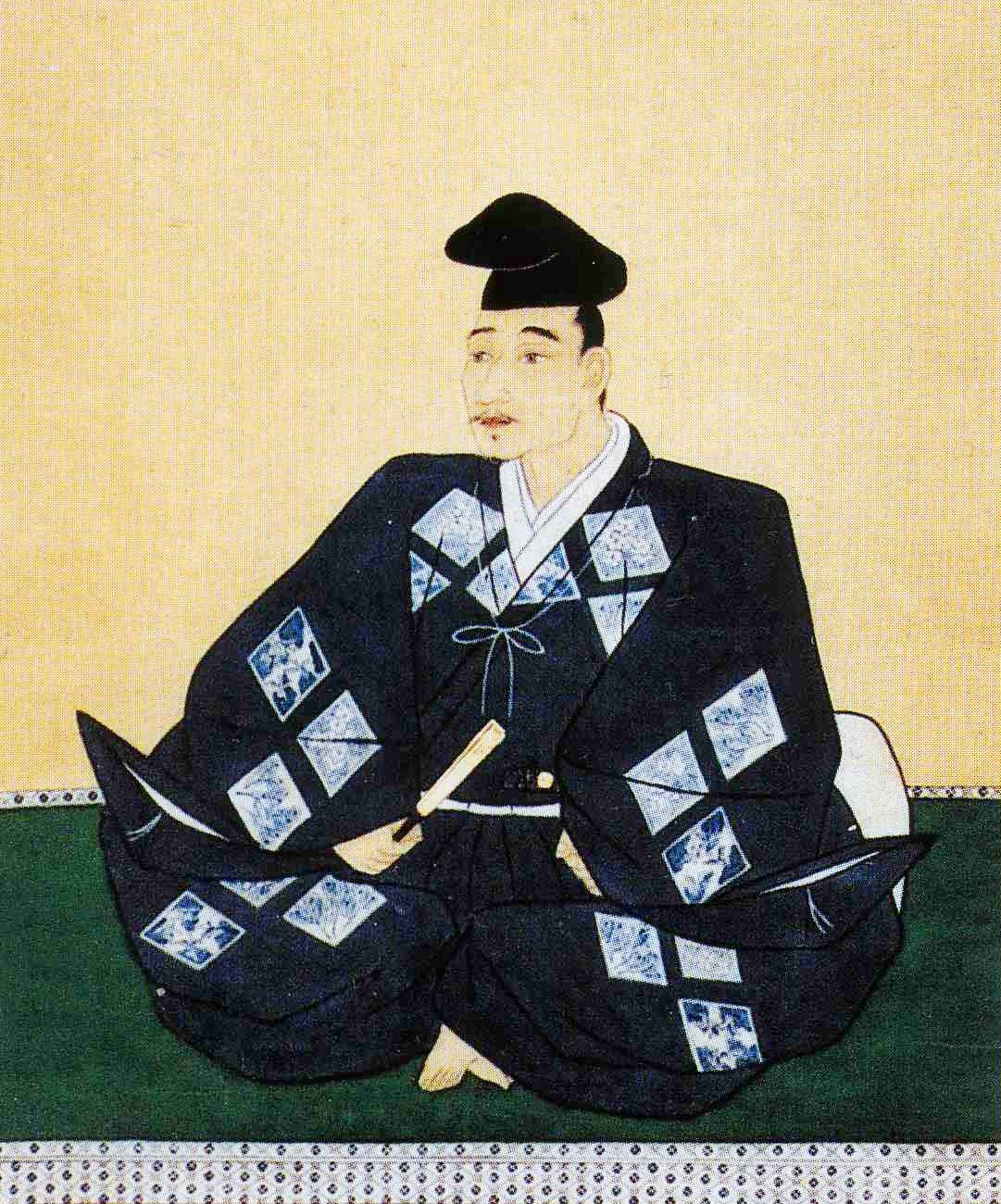
- Yoritaka Hachiya (1534–1589), Japanese samurai
- Pronunciation: joɾitaka (IPA)
- Gender: Male

Origin
- Origin: Japanese
- Meaning: Different meanings depending on the kanji used

Yoritaka is both a masculine Japanese given name and a Japanese surname.

== Written forms ==
Yoritaka can be written using different combinations of kanji characters. Here are some examples:

- 頼隆, "rely, noble"
- 頼孝, "rely, filial piety"
- 頼貴, "rely, precious"
- 頼崇, "rely, respect"
- 頼高, "rely, tall"
- 頼昂, "rely, rise"
- 依隆, "to depend on, noble"
- 依孝, "to depend on, filial piety"
- 依貴, "to depend on, precious"
- 依崇, "to depend on, respect"
- 依高, "to depend on, tall"
- 依昂, "to depend on, rise"

The name can also be written in hiragana よりたか or katakana ヨリタカ.

== Notable people with the given name Yoritaka ==
- Yoritaka Hachiya (蜂屋 頼隆; 1534–1589), Japanese samurai
- Yoritaka Matsudaira (松平 頼位; 1810–1886), Japanese daimyō

== Notable people with the surname Yoritaka ==
- Hideo Yoritaka (頼高 英雄; born 1963), Japanese politician
