= Ajaib, Meham =

Coordinates: 28°59′N 76°25′E

Ajaib is a village of Rohtak district, Haryana, India. It is a part of Meham Choubisi. It is situated on NH-10 (Old Numbering), 28 kilometres (17 mi) from Rohtak city, and roughly 8 kilometres (5.0 mi) from Meham Town.

== See also ==
- Meham
