= 2007 Warabi mayoral election =

Warabi, Saitama held a mayoral election on June 3, 2007. Hideo Yoritaka, an independent backed by the Japanese Communist Party (JCP) won.

== Candidates ==
- Hideo Yoritaka, member of the Japanese Communist Party and former city assembly member.
- Shono Takuya, Mayor of Warabi from 2003 to 2007, supported by conservative Liberal Democratic Party (LDP) and Komeito.

The Democratic Party of Japan, the second largest party in Japan, did not support any of the candidates.

== Results ==
Mayoral election 2007: Warabi City
Party	Candidate	Votes	%	±%
Independent, JCP	Hideo Yoritaka	17,815		
Independent, LDP, Komeito	Shono Takuya	14,506		
Turnout		33,128	59.24%	−3.02%
