= Kurds in Japan =

Ethnic diaspora group

Kurds in Japan Kurdên Japonyayê 在日クルド人 (Zainichi Kurudo-jin)
Total population
- 2,000–3,000

Regions with significant populations
- Southern Saitama (Kawaguchi, Warabi), Tokyo, Chiba, Aichi Prefectures

Languages
- Kurdish, Turkish, Japanese

Religion
- Islam (Sunni, Shia, Alevism), Yazidism, Zoroastrianism

Related ethnic groups
- Turks in Japan

Kurds in Japan (Japanese: 在日クルド人, Zainichi Kurudo-jin, Kurdish: Kurdên Japonyayê, Sorani Kurdish: کوردانی ژاپۆن) refers to Kurds residing in Japan. Kurds do not have a majority nation state and live in Kurdistan, a region that includes Turkey, Syria, Iran and Iraq in the Middle East and South Caucasus.

Since 2023, anti-Kurdish sentiment has risen significantly in Japan. The immediate catalyst was a large-scale brawl involving over 100 Kurdish individuals. Tensions are especially high in Kawaguchi City, where a large number of Kurds live in close proximity with Japanese residents. Some local residents feel that members of the Kurdish community do not follow local rules or social norms.

In addition, anti-Kurdish sentiment in Japan is believed to have been further fueled by some Turkish individuals who spread anti-Kurdish messages in Japanese on the social media platform X. Kurds have been receiving death threats and calls for their mass deportation.

== Background ==
Japan and Turkey have a visa waiver agreement for up to 90 days. Kurds can make a claim that they are persecuted in Turkey, but the Turkish government claims that there are no Kurdish refugees because Kurds 'have the right to vote and their human rights are guaranteed'.

As of 2024, only one refugee claim has been granted by the Japanese government, a case won in court in 2022 against the rejection of a refugee claim.

The issue of Kurdish residents illegally in Japan repeatedly applying for refugee status and continuing to stay in the country has come to the fore, and the revised Immigration Control Act came into force on 10 June 2024 to fundamentally address this problem. This allows refugee claimants to be deported after the third time, unless they can provide 'material with reasonable grounds' for a new refugee claim. As of March 2024, there were 1,661 multiple refugee claimants nationwide, of whom 402, or a quarter, were Turkish nationals; 80% of the 1661 were second time claimants. There were a total of 348 foreigners living in the country who were third to sixth time claimants who had refused deportation and could eventually be deported.

== History ==
In the 1990s, they began to settle in the area around Warabi Station. Many of them continued to live in the area illegally, without residence permits, with the local government unaware of their true status.

In the 1990s, Kurds of Turkish nationality began arriving in Japan, following Iranian Kurds who had been living in Japan since the 1980s, and settled in Kawaguchi City and Warabi City in Saitama Prefecture, where rents and other living costs were relatively cheap given their proximity to Tokyo. The area have become the largest Kurd settlement in Japan.

In 2010, during the Democratic Party of Japan (DPJ) administration, a unified work permit was introduced for applicants who had applied for refugee status six months earlier, which led to an increase in the number of refugee applicants applying for refugee status to work in Japan. On 12 January 2006, the Abe administration abolished the unified work requirement and reinstated the residence and work requirements for applicants who clearly did not qualify as refugees, and the number of refugee applicants dropped by half.

By 2024, the total number of Kurds in Japan is estimated to be 2,000 or more than 3,000, depending on media reports. As of April 2024, it is estimated that in Kawaguchi City, Saitama Prefecture, there are about 700 "provisional releasees" who are illegal immigrants, and about 1,300 provisional releasees with a temporary residence status called "specified activities" (refugee visa during refugee status procedures). Previously, information on provisional releasees had not been reported to local governments, making it difficult to ascertain the actual number of such persons, but the Immigration Control and Refugee Recognition Act has been revised and the actual number is now known. It is reported that following the implementation of the revised Act, the suspension of deportation during the application for refugee status will in principle be limited to twice, and the number of provisional releasees is expected to decrease.

Many Kurds in Japan are said to use a mixture of Kurdish and Turkish. However, some parents do not teach their children Kurdish.

== Kurdistan Workers' Party ==
In 2015, a clash took place outside the Turkish embassy in Tokyo between Kurds and Turks in Japan during early voting for the Turkish general election. Japanese and Kurdish sources claimed the clash began when the Turks assaulted the Kurds after a Kurdish party flag was shown at the embassy.

In December 2008, the Turkish government froze the assets of two organisations in Japan, including the Japan Kurdish Cultural Association and the Kurdistan Red Moon, and six of their leaders, including Wakkas Çorak, the secretary-general of the Japan Kurdish Cultural Association, for their support of the Kurdistan Workers' Party (PKK). The fundraising event held at the Japan Kurdish Cultural Association office, which featured a flag depicting the founder of the PKK and the PKK's flag, along with the transfer of approximately 40 million yen collected for the PKK, was identified by the Turkish government as a terrorist financing operation. The flag of a PKK-affiliated organisation is displayed in the office of the Japan Kurdish Cultural Association.

The Kurdish festival Nowruz, organised by the Japanese Kurdish Cultural Association, is also opposed by local residents to the use of the park for events because of the PKK-affiliated flags and the singing of the Kurdish anthem. In March 2024, a permit was granted after it had been denied, Neuroz was held in Saitama Prefecture, with as many as 1,300 people taking part in the event amidst a fierce uprising, under a high alert by a large number of riot police and Saitama Prefectural Police. Also in Neuroz, the PKK sign, Peace, is held up by many participants to create a lot of excitement.

== Legal status ==
Most Kurds in Japan are from shepherding villages in Southeast Turkey and reside in the Warabi and Kawaguchi areas of Saitama Prefecture, north of Tokyo. Warabi, especially, has been nicknamed "Warabistan" by those who are interested in Kurdish people, culture and issues.

Some Kurdish people arrived in Japan in order to request refugee status; citing human rights abuses in Turkey and Iraq. Nonetheless, so far none have been successful in their application due to failing to meet refugee status requirements. While many obtain visas through marriage with a Japanese citizen, most have obtained "Special Permission to Stay" (在留特別許可, Zairyū Tokubetsu Kyoka) visas, which must be renewed every three months while their refugee application or appeal is being reviewed. A documentary directed by Masaru Nomoto (野本 大) entitled Backdrop Kurdistan (バックドロップ・クルディスタン) documented the legal struggles of one Kurdish family (Kazankıran family: Japanese: カザンキラン, Kazankiran) from Kahramanmaraş Province.

== Medical and educational challenges involving Kurdish communities ==
According to investigations by Mainichi Shimbun and journalist Norihide Miyoshi (ja), non-payment of medical expenses by foreign nationals has become a significant issue in cities such as Kawaguchi and Warabi, where a large Kurdish population resides. In Kawaguchi, for instance, foreign nationals make up only 7.6% of the population, yet they account for 18.8% of unpaid medical fees. The proportion is particularly high in specific departments: 24% in obstetrics and gynecology, 80% in emergency care, and 42% of all medical debts ultimately written off were attributed to unpaid bills by foreign nationals.

It has been reported that a rumor has spread among some members of the Kurdish community suggesting that giving birth in Japan could prevent deportation. This is said to have led to an increase in the number of Kurdish women entering Japan shortly after becoming pregnant, exacerbating the issue. Children born in such circumstances are often raised in environments where exposure to the Japanese language is limited, resulting in poor language proficiency. Many are said to be involved in family businesses, such as demolition work, from middle school age, and some reportedly engage in delinquent behavior. In some cases, families are reluctant to enroll their children in local schools, making it difficult for local governments to provide educational support.

== Anti-Kurdish sentiment in Japan ==
Social media posts, that were in part spread by some Turkish people using Google Translate, have caused an increase in hate against Kurdish people in Japan. Such posts reportedly began to escalate in Spring 2023. The Asahi Shimbun found that posts on social media platform X about Kurdish people in Japan went from 40,000 in March 2023 to 240,000 in April 2023, to 1.08 million by July. By March 2024, it reached 2.42 million. Journalist Ishii Takaaki has been accused of being a significant figure of spreading anti-Kurdish messaging, which Ishii denies. Ishii claimed in a statement that "Japanese hardly discriminate". One video was edited to link Kurds in Japan to violent separatism in Turkey. It received over 12 million views total. Numerous comments reportedly demanded that Kurds should be expelled from Japan or killed. The reputation of the Kurdistan Workers' Party ("PKK"), which is considered by Turkey and the West to be a terrorist organization, has affected Kurds in Japan. The Japan Kurdish Cultural Organization has denied links to the PKK, but Japanese social media posts reportedly often generalize Kurds as being terrorists regardless.

Some of the Kurdish people in Saitama had friction with residents over noise complaints and adherence to garbage collection rules. A public brawl involving Kurdish people in a parking lot received significant news attention, and a significant outpouring of hate speech on the internet.

Death threats and demands for the expulsion of Kurds from Japan have escalated. One Kurdish restaurant owner received calls with such messages. Several Kurds interviewed reported to be fearing for their lives. Japanese local government employees reported being inundated with phone calls to expel the Kurds or foreigners in general. One employee reported that their entire day was taken up with dealing with such calls. One man was charged with sending death threats to a Kurdish organization; he reportedly vowed to "kill all the Kurds and feed them to the pigs".

== Response by politicians and law enforcement ==
In June 2023, the Kawaguchi City Council passed an opinion calling on the state, prefecture and other authorities to 'strengthen the crackdown on crimes committed by some foreigners' in the city, citing friction between 'some foreigners' and local residents in the city.

In February 2025, during a session of the House of Representatives Budget Committee, Hideaki Takahashi, a lawmaker from Kawaguchi City, referred to a case in which a Kurdish individual had been arrested for the rape of a minor girl in the city. The lawmaker urged Prime Minister Shigeru Ishiba to take stronger measures to deport Kurdish residents who do not have valid residence permits. In response, Ishiba stated, "It is absolutely unacceptable for the Japanese government to allow harm to the lives and property of Japanese citizens by foreign nationals who do not follow the rules. We cannot coexist with those who disregard the rules. It is the duty of the Japanese government to ensure that such individuals do not remain in the country." In June 2024, the Kurdish individual was sentenced to one year in prison, suspended for three years, for engaging in sexual acts with a junior high school girl. During the suspension period, he was sentenced to eight years in prison for sexually assaulting another junior high school girl.

On May 28, Liberal Democratic Party Policy Research Council Chairman Itsunori Onodera visited Kawaguchi City to observe areas where tensions have arisen between Japanese residents and Kurdish communities, including a convenience store and a garbage collection site associated with noise complaints and waste disposal issues. Speaking to reporters, he stated that the current legal framework is sometimes insufficient to address such problems, and announced plans to soon submit a policy proposal to the government outlining new measures aimed at facilitating coexistence with foreign residents.

In June 2025, three politicians, two members of the Saitama Prefectural Assembly and one member of the Kawaguchi City Council, filed a criminal complaint accusing Kurdish individuals of confinement and assault after being attacked during an inspection of a materials yard operated by a demolition company run by Kurds.

On July 8, a Kurdish resident of Japan who was regarded as a leading figure within the Kurdish community and frequently appeared in Japanese media to speak from a Kurdish perspective was deported. He had lived in Japan for 20 years without legal residency status and had applied for refugee recognition six times.

On July 29, 2025, Motohiro Ōno, Governor of Saitama Prefecture, announced that he would recommend a temporary suspension of the visa exemption agreement between Japan and Turkey to the Ministry of Foreign Affairs, citing concerns over Kurdish individuals repeatedly applying for refugee status to prolong their stay in Japan. Nobuo Okunogi (ja), the mayor of Kawaguchi City, also expressed his support for the proposal. On the following day, July 30, Minister of Justice Keisuke Suzuki met with the Turkish ambassador to Japan, Oğuzhan Ertuğrul, and conveyed his grave concern over the large number of Kurdish nationals from Turkey overstaying their visas in Japan. In response, the ambassador stated that the Turkish government encourages its citizens to comply with Japanese laws and customs.

== See also ==
- Kurdish diaspora
- Immigration to Japan
- Turks in Japan
- My Small Land
