= Ramzan =

Ramzan may refer to:

- Ramadan, also written as "Ramzan" because of the Persian transliteration "Ramzān".

== Given name ==
- Ramzan Asayev (born 1993), Chechen footballer
- Ramzan Siddique Bhatti (born 1976), Pakistani politician
- Ramzan Chhipa (born 1971), Pakistani philanthropist
- Ramzan Ghanchi, Pakistani politician
- Ramzan Kadyrov (born 1976), President of Chechnya and a former Chechen rebel
- Ramzan Khadzhiev (1955–1996), Kazakh-born Chechen journalist
- Ramzan Mezhidov (1967–1999), freelance Chechen cameraman
- Ramzan Paskayev (born 1947), Chechen accordionist and folk musician
- Joël Mohammed Ramzan Piroe (born 1990), Dutch-born Indo-Surinamese footballer
- Ramzan Rizwan (1955–2014), Pakistani tissue seller and murderer
- Ramzan Sebiyev (born 1969), Chechen boxer
- Ramzan Tsutsulayev (born 1972), Chechen footballer and coach

== Surname ==
- Ahsan Ramzan, Pakistani snooker player
- Mohammad Ramzan, a number of people with the name
- Shad Ramzan (born 1956), Kashmiri author
- Tarak Ramzan (born 1953), British businessman

== Places ==
- Ramzan Miah Mosque, a place of worship in Bangladesh
- Ramzan Nagar, a village and union council in Bangladesh
- Ramzan Rajar, a village in Pakistan
- Ramzan Sugar Mills, a group of sugar mills in Pakistan

== See also ==
- Ramazan (disambiguation)
- Ramadan (disambiguation)
- Ramdan (disambiguation)
