= Bharan =

- village
- Location in Haryana, India Bharan (India)
- Coordinates: 28.96802°N 76.38715°E
- Country: India
- State: Haryana
- District: Rohtak
- Tehsil: Maham
- Village: Bharan
- Established: 1700
- Founder: Ch.Bhani Singh Bamel

Population (2011)
  - Total: 5,801

Languages
  - Official: Hindi
- Time zone: UTC+5:30 (IST)

Bharan is a village in the district of Rohtak in the Indian state of Haryana.This village was founded by Ch.Bhani Singh Bamel around 1700 CE.It is one of the main villages of Bamel Khap.
