= Japanese people in Turkey =

Ethnic group in the Republic of Turkey

- (Japan) (Turkey)

Total population
- 1,430 (2010); 1,765 (2025)

Regions with significant populations
- Istanbul · Ankara

Languages
- Turkish · Japanese

Related ethnic groups
- Japanese diaspora

There is a medium-sized population of Japanese people in Turkey, comprising mostly recent expatriates from Japan and their descendants born in Turkey. As of September 2010, their numbers were recorded at 1,430 by the Japanese Ministry of Foreign Affairs. Most Japanese living in Turkey are based in Ankara and Istanbul.

There was a very small population of Japanese in the country prior to 1945 when Turkey declared war on Germany and Japan during World War II; following the conflict and the severing of Turkey's trade and diplomatic relations with Japan, most had left. A Japanese travel agent and information office had closed down its presence and all its personnel had left. There were also no Japanese businessmen left in Turkey. Only people with diplomatic and consular status remained, numbering about fifteen. They were interned at a consulate building in Ayaspaşa, Istanbul. Some people who resided in the neighbourhood at that time remember that the interned Japanese nationals were sometimes permitted to go to Yıldız Park for a walk.

== Istanbul ==
As of 2011 about 900 Japanese persons resided in Istanbul; 768 were officially registered with the Japanese Consulate of Istanbul as of October 2010. Of those living in Istanbul, about 450-500 are employees of Japanese companies and their family members, making up around half of the total Japanese population. Others include students of Turkish language and culture, business owners, and Japanese married to Turks. Istanbul has several Japanese restaurants, a Japanese newspaper, and a 32-page Japanese magazine.

According to the Istanbul Japanese School, circa 2019 there were about 2,000 Japanese citizens in the Istanbul area, with about 100 of them being children of the ages in which, in Japan, they would be legally required to attend school. At the same period there were about 110 Japanese companies in operation in the city.

== Education ==
The Istanbul Japanese School is a Japanese international school.

Istanbul also has a weekend Japanese education programme, The Japanese Saturday School in Istanbul.

The Ankara Japanese School (アンカラ日本人学校) previously existed. It opened on April 1, 1979 (Showa 54),

== Notable individuals ==
Masatoshi Gündüz Ikeda

- Masatoshi Gündüz Ikeda, Japanese-born Turkish mathematician (Originally from Tokyo, Japan)

== See also ==
- Japan-Turkey relations
- Turks in Japan
