= Offensive =

Offensive may refer to:

- Offensive (military), type of military operation
- Offensive, the former name of the Dutch political party Socialist Alternative
- Offensive content, material on the internet deemed controversial
- Fighting words, spoken words which would have a tendency to cause acts of violence by the person to whom they are addressed
- Pejorative words
- Profanity, strongly impolite, rude or offensive language
- Political correctness, non-offensive language

== See also ==
- Offense (disambiguation)
- Offender (disambiguation)
- Charm offensive (disambiguation)
