= Warabi =

Warabi 蕨市
- City
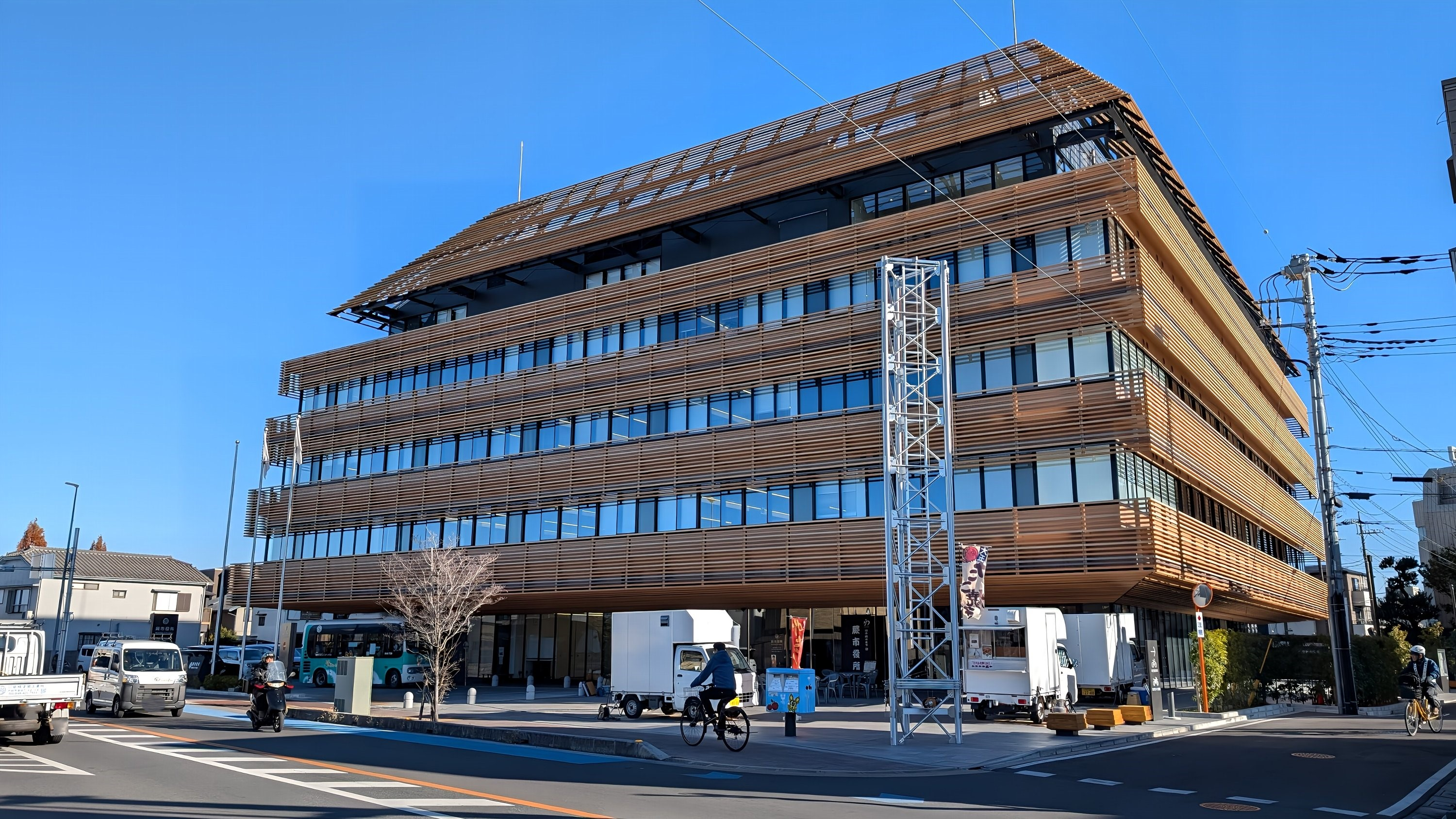
- Warabi City Hall

- Flag Seal

- Location of Warabi in Saitama Prefecture

- Location within Japan Location within Saitama Prefecture
- Coordinates: 35°49′32.1″N 139°40′47″E
- Country: Japan
- Region: Kantō
- Prefecture: Saitama

Government
  - Mayor: Hideo Yoritaka

Area
  - Total: 5.11 km^{2} (1.97 sq mi)

Population (February 2024)
  - Total: 75,614
  - Density: 14,800/km^{2} (38,300/sq mi)
- Time zone: UTC+9 (Japan Standard Time)
- Tree: Zelkova serrata
- Flower: Rhododendron indicum
- Phone number: 048-432-3200
- Address: 5-14-15 Chuo, Warabi-shi, Saitama-ken 335-8501
- Website: Official website

Warabi (蕨市, Warabi-shi) is a city located in Saitama Prefecture, Japan. As of 1 February 2024, the city had an estimated population of 75,614 in 41,025 households and a population density of 15,000 persons per km^{2}. The total area of the city is 5.11 square kilometres (1.97 sq mi). Warabi has the smallest area of any municipality in Japan, and highest population density outside of the special wards of Tokyo.

== Geography ==
Warabi is located in the southeastern part of Saitama Prefecture, bordering Saitama City in the north, Toda in the west, and Kawaguchi in the east. The city area is in the Arakawa lowland and averages 4.8 meters above sea level. Land use mainly consists of residential areas.

=== Surrounding municipalities ===
- Saitama Prefecture
  - Kawaguchi
  - Saitama (Minami-ku)
  - Toda

=== Climate ===
Warabi has a humid subtropical climate (Köppen Cfa) characterized by warm summers and cool winters with light to no snowfall. The average annual temperature in Warabi is 14.8 °C. The average annual rainfall is 1482 mm with September as the wettest month. The temperatures are highest on average in August, at around 26.6 °C, and lowest in January, at around 3.2 °C.

== Demographics ==
Per Japanese census data, the population of Warabi has remained relatively constant over the past 50 years.

Historical population
Year	Pop.	±%
1920	6,204	—
1930	7,804	+25.8%
1940	14,178	+81.7%
1950	29,846	+110.5%
1960	50,952	+70.7%
1970	77,225	+51.6%
1980	70,876	−8.2%
1990	73,620	+3.9%
2000	71,063	−3.5%
2010	71,502	+0.6%
2020	74,283	+3.9%

Beginning in the 1990s, due to Japan allowing nationals of Turkey a 90 day visa-free stay, ethnic Kurds began moving to Warabi. By 2025 Warabi and Kawaguchi had the majority of ethnic Kurds in Japan.

== History ==
Warabi developed from the Muromachi period as Warabi-shuku, a post town on the Nakasendō highway. It was created as a town with the establishment of the modern municipalities system on 1 April 1889 and was elevated to city status on 1 April 1959.

== Government ==
Warabi has a mayor-council form of government with a directly elected mayor and a unicameral city council of 18 members. Warabi contributes one member to the Saitama Prefectural Assembly. In terms of national politics, the city is part of Saitama 15th district of the lower house of the Diet of Japan. The directly-elected executive mayor is Hideo Yoritaka, a member of the Japanese Communist Party.

=== Elections ===
- 2007 Warabi mayoral election
- 2007 Warabi city assembly election

== Economy ==
Warabi has many small and medium-sized factories, which have employed many foreign workers. In particular, many Iranians and Kurds fled the ethnic problems and wars in the Middle East, and have settled in Warabi. Recently, the ratio of Chinese residents is the highest in Saitama Prefecture. The bulk of the working population commutes to Saitama City or Tokyo Metropolis, making Warabi largely a commuter town.

== Education ==
Warabi has seven public elementary schools and three public middle schools operated by the city government, and one public high school operated by the Saitama Prefectural Board of Education. There is also one combined private middle/high school.

=== High schools ===
- Bunan Junior & Senior High School
- Saitama Prefectural Warabi High School

=== Middle schools ===
- Bunan Junior & Senior High School
- Warabi Municipal Higashi Junior High School
- Warabi Municipal No. 1 Junior High School
- Warabi Municipal No. 2 Junior High School

=== Elementary schools ===
- Warabi Municipal Chūō Elementary School
- Warabi Municipal Chūō-Higashi Elementary School
- Warabi Municipal Higashi Elementary School
- Warabi Municipal Kita Elementary School
- Warabi Municipal Minami Elementary School
- Warabi Municipal Nishi Elementary School
- Warabi Municipal Tsukagoshi Elementary School

== Transportation ==
=== Railway ===
JR East – Keihin-Tohoku line

- Warabi

=== Highway ===
- National Route 17

== Sister cities ==
- El Dorado County, California, United States, sister municipality to Warabi city since 26 March 1975

== Mascots ==
In 1989, the character Wallaby was designed by a competition entrant to celebrate the 30th anniversary of Warabi. In 2009, the characters design was changed to celebrate the 50th anniversary. In Japanese, the word for 'wallaby' is pronounced warabii (ワラビー), a near-homophone of the city name.
A second mascot, called Angel Warabu, was designed in 2010. It was designed by Toshihiko Takamizawa of the band The Alfee, who is from Warabi. The mascot is a sleeping pig with wings.

== Noted people from Warabi ==
- Gen Hoshino, singer-songwriter
- Haruna Kojima, actress and model, former member of AKB48
- Yasuhiro Suzuki, professional wrestler
- Toshihiko Takamizawa, member of The Alfee
- Yana Toboso, manga artist
- Hidetaka Yoshioka, actor
