= Ramdan =

Ramdan may refer to:

- Ramadan, Muslim holiday
- Hafiz Ramdan (born 1993), Malaysian footballer
- Ramdan Rosli (born 1996), Malaysian motorcycle racer
- Misbun Ramdan Misbun (born 1991), Malaysian badminton player
- Zuhra Ramdan Agha Al-Awji, Libyan educator

== See also ==
- Ramadan (disambiguation)
- Ramazan (disambiguation)
- Ramzan (disambiguation)
- Ramdhanu, a 2014 Indian film
