= Sumer–Elam war =

War between Sumer and Elam in circa 2700 BC

The Sumer–Elam war took place across present-day Iraq and Iran and is one of the earliest conflicts for which contemporaneous, anecdotal evidence exists, though details of this war are slight. Fought between the forces of Sumer and Elam, it began c. 2600 BC. The written sources on the conflict are the earliest mentioning Elam's existence.

== History ==
According to later Sumerian sources such as the Sumerian King List (SKL), the Sumerians led by Enmebaragesi, King of Kish, invaded Elam and were victorious. However, Enmebaragesi's identity and dating have been subject to some debate among researchers, while the Sumerian sources are not necessarily reliable. For instance, the SKL claims that Enmebaragesi ruled for 900 years. Despite this, contemporaneous fragments of alabaster vessels with Enmebaragesi's name (found at Khafajah) lend credence to the belief that the king was a historical figure, supporting the later texts' claims on the war's occurrence. Furthermore, a votive inscription by "Enna'il, son of A'anzu" from the Early Dynastic Period (extant as a later copy) mentions that Kish conquered Elam.

Assyriologist D. T. Potts stated that if the war did happen, King Enmebaragesi possibly led his invasion army from Kish in northern Babylonia along a path which later became the Royal Road, until attacking the Elamite center at or around Susa. This path's use by Sumerians has been confirmed for the Early Dynastic Period. Within a century, the Elamites under the Awan dynasty retaliated and invaded Sumer, toppling the First Dynasty of Ur. Over the next few centuries, the two peoples repeatedly went to war.

== See also ==
- Umma–Lagash war
- Mari–Ebla war
- Conquests of Sargon of Akkad
- List of conflicts in Iraq
