= Offense =

Offense or offence may refer to:

== Common meanings ==
- Offense or crime, a violation of penal law
- An insult, or negative feeling in response to a perceived insult
- An attack, a proactive offensive engagement
- Sin, an act that violates a known moral rule
- Offense (sports), the action of engaging an opposing team with the objective of scoring

== Media ==
- The Offence, a 1972 drama film directed by Sidney Lumet
- "Offense" (Law & Order: Criminal Intent), an episode of Law & Order: Criminal Intent, 2008

== Other uses ==
- Offense (policy debate), arguments that make a definite value judgment about an advocacy
- Religious offense, an offense against religion

== See also ==
- Offender (disambiguation)
- Offensive (disambiguation)
