= Persian War =

Persian War, Persia War, or, Persian Wars, may refer to:

== Warfare ==
- List of wars involving Iran (before 1979); Wars involving the predecessor states to the Islamic Republic of Iran - many of which have been referred to as Persia.
- List of wars involving Iran (also called Persia); War in Persia
- Greco-Persian Wars or Persian Wars; a series of wars between Ancient Greece and the Achaemenid Persian Empire.
- Roman–Persian Wars or Roman-Iranian Wars; a series of wars between the Roman Republic and Empire, and the Parthian and Sasanian Empires
- Russo-Persian Wars, between the Russian Empire and the Persian Empire
  - Russo-Persian War (1651–53)
  - Russo-Persian War (1722–23)
  - Persian Expedition of 1796 (Russo-Persian War of 1796)
  - Russo-Persian War (1804–13)
  - Russo-Persian War (1826–28)
- Muslim conquest of Persia, a war between the Sassanid Persian Empire and the Rashidun Caliphate
- Turco–Persian Wars (disambiguation)
- Anglo-Persian War or Anglo-Iranian War (1856–1857), between the British Empire and the Persian Empire

== Other uses ==
- Persian War (horse) (1963–1984), British-trained racehorse
- Persian Wars (video game), a 2001 video game by Cryo Interactive Entertainment
- Persian War, the first two books of The Wars of Justinian by Procopius of Ancient Rome

== See also ==
- Gulf War (1991), also known as the Persian Gulf War, Operation Granby, or Operation Desert Storm
- Iran–Iraq War (1980–1988), also known as the Persian Gulf War or the First Gulf War
- Iraq War (2003–2011), also known as the Second or Third Gulf War or Persian Gulf War
- Iraq War (disambiguation)
- Gulf War (disambiguation)
- Persian (disambiguation)
- Persia (disambiguation)
