= Invasion of Iraq (disambiguation) =

The main invasion of Iraq occurred in 2003.

Other similar titled events are:

- Iraq War, protracted conflict following the 2003 U.S.-led invasion
- June 2014 Northern Iraq offensive, a massive Islamic State offensive against Iraq (also known as ISIS)
- Gulf War, an invasion of Iraq in 1991 by the United States-led coalition following Iraq's invasion of Kuwait in 1990
- Anglo-Iraqi War, the British invasion of Iraq during World War II
- Mesopotamian campaign, the Allied invasion of Ottoman Iraq in 1914–1918
- Siege of Baghdad (1258), a Mongol invasion of Iraq
- Qarmatian invasion of Iraq, a raid of Abbasid Iraq by the Qarmatians in 927–928

== See also ==
- Iraq War (disambiguation)
- Iraqi invasion (disambiguation)
- Military history of Iraq
- List of wars involving Iraq
