= Saitama Prefectural Warabi High School =

School in Japan

Coordinates: 35°49′58.3″N 139°40′27.1″E

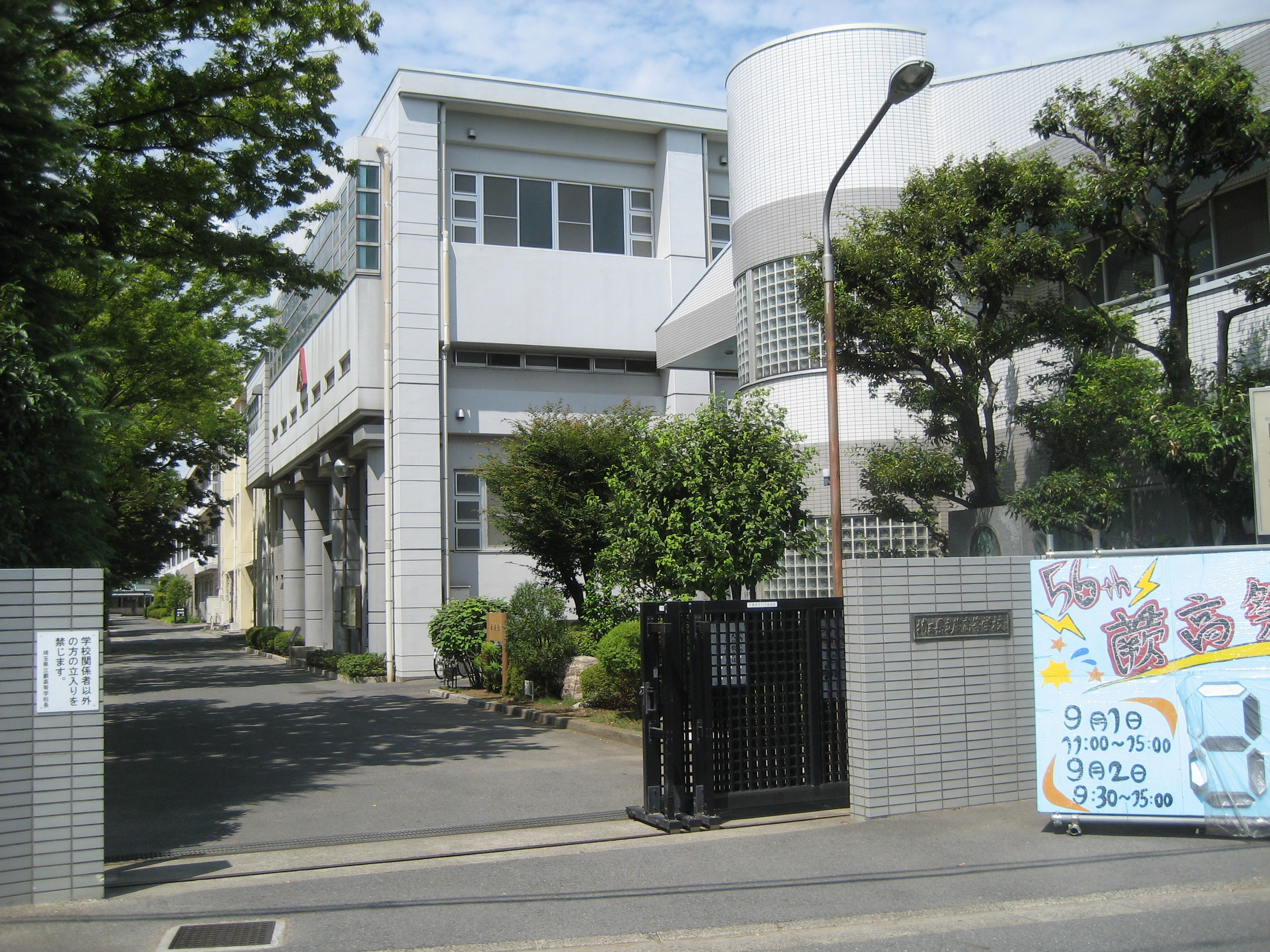
Saitama Prefectural,Warabi High School

Saitama Prefectural Warabi High School (埼玉県立蕨高等学校, Saitama Kenritsu Warabi Koutou Gakkou), often shortened to Warakou (蕨高) is a public high school, located in Warabi City, Saitama, Japan.

The school was established in a temporary schoolhouse on 1 April 1957 in Warabi. The first entrance ceremony was on 15 April of the same year, which was set as the school's official foundation day.
