= Iraq civil war =

Iraqi civil war may refer to:

- Iraqi–Kurdish conflict (1918–2003), wars and rebellions by Iraqi Kurds against the government
  - First Iraqi–Kurdish War (1961–70)
  - Second Iraqi–Kurdish War (1974–75)
- 1991 Iraqi uprisings, rebellions in Iraq during a ceasefire in the Gulf War
- Iraqi Kurdish Civil War (1994–97), a conflict between rival Kurdish factions in Iraqi Kurdistan
- Iraqi conflict (2003–present). See also:
  - Iraq War (2003–11), a war that began with the U.S. invasion of Iraq
    - Iraqi insurgency (2003–2011)
    - Occupation of Iraq (2003–2011)
    - Iraqi civil war (2006–2008), a civil war between Sunni and Shia militias including the Iraqi government and Al-Qaeda in Iraq (now known as ISIL)
      - Islamic Army–Al-Qaeda conflict
  - Iraqi insurgency (2011–2013), an escalation of insurgent and sectarian violence after the U.S. withdrew
  - War in Iraq (2013–2017), a war between ISIL and the Iraqi government and allies
  - 2017 Iraqi–Kurdish conflict, a short conflict between the Iraqi government and the autonomous Kurdish regional government

== See also ==
- Iraq War (disambiguation)
- Military history of Iraq
- List of wars involving Iraq
