= Offender =

Offender(s) or The Offender(s) may refer to:

- A criminal, one who commits a criminal offense
- Offender (film), a 2012 British action film
- Offenders (2017 film), a Serbian drama film
- Offenders (comics), a Marvel Comics team
- The Offenders (1921 film), a 1921 American melodrama film
- The Offenders (1980 film), a 1980 American No Wave film
- The Offenders, the working title of The Outlaws (2021 TV series)
- The Offenders (TV special), a canceled crossover animated special planned at Hulu

== See also ==
- Offense (disambiguation)
- Offensive (disambiguation)
