= Istanbul Japanese School =

School in Istanbul, Turkey

- イスタンブル日本人学校; İstanbul Japon Okulu

Location
- Tanburi Ali Efendi Sokak NO.16; Etiler Istanbul Turkey タンブリ アリ エフェンデイ ソカク NO.16 エチレル イスタンブル; 41.0769548°N 29.0300571°E

Information
- Website: ijstr.jp

Istanbul Japanese School (イスタンブル日本人学校, Isutanburu Nihonjin Gakkō; Turkish: İstanbul Japon Okulu) is a Japanese international school located in Etiler, Beşiktaş, Istanbul, Turkey.

The school is run by the Japanese Education and Culture Association (Japanese: 日本文化教育協会, Turkish: Japon Eğitim Kültür Derneği). The diploma received here cannot be qualified as a Turkish school diploma.

As of 2015, the school has about 80 students. They use a school bus to travel to and from the campus.

== See also ==
- Japanese people in Turkey
