= Ramazan =

Ramazan often refers to:

- Ramadan or Ramazan, the holy month in Islam during which Muslims fast for 30 days

Ramazan may also refer to:

== Given name (people) ==
=== Sportsmen ===
- Ramazan Abbasov (born 1983), Azerbaijani football (soccer) player
- Ramazan Baştuğ (born 2000), Turkish long-distance runner
- Ramazan Çevik (born 1992), Belgian footballer of Turkish descent
- Ramazan Kahya (born 1984), Turkish footballer
- Ramazan Köse (born 1988), Turkish footballer
- Ramazan Kurşunlu (born 1981), Turkish footballer
- Ramazan Magomedov, Belarusian amateur boxer who qualified for the 2008 Olympics
- Ramazan Orazov (born 1998), Kazakh footballer
- Ramazan Özcan (born 1984), Austrian football goalkeeper
- Ramazan Ramazanov (born 1984), Russian kickboxer
- Ramazan Rragami (1944–2022), Albanian footballer
- Ramazan Şahin (born 1983), Turkish freestyle wrestler of Chechen origin
- Ramazan Sal (born 1985), Turkish footballer
- Ramazan Serkan Kılıç (born 1984), Turkish volleyball player
- Ramazan Tavşancıoğlu (born 1984), Australian footballer
- Ramazan Tunç (born 1975), Turkish footballer
- Ramazan Yıldırım (born 1975), German-born Turkish former footballer and manager
- Ramazan Yılmaz (born 2005), Turkish cyclist

=== Politicians ===
- Ramazan-zade Yeşilce Mehmet Çelebi, Ottoman minister of finance during the reign of Suleiman
- Ramazan Abdulatipov (born 1946), Russian politician of Dagestani heritage
- Ramazan Bashardost (born 1965), an Afghan politician

=== Other people ===
- Ramazan Kubat (born 1974), Turkish folk singer and composer
- Ramazan Yesergepov, jailed Kazakhstani journalist

== Places ==
- Rămăzan, a village administered by Rîșcani city, Moldova

== Other uses ==
- Ramazanids (Ramazan Beg), Turkish emirate from 1352 to 1608

== See also ==
- Ramzan (disambiguation)
- Ramadan (disambiguation)
- Ramdan (disambiguation)
