= Battle of Baghdad =

The Battle, capture, fall, or siege of Baghdad may refer to (the):

- Siege of Baghdad (812–813), during the Fourth Fitna in the Abbasid Caliphate
- Siege of Baghdad (865), during the Fifth Fitna in the Abbasid Caliphate
- Buyid capture of Baghdad (945) , by the Buyid dynasty against Abbasid caliphate
- Battle of Baghdad (946), by the Buyid dynasty against the Hamdanid dynasty
- Capture of Baghdad (1055), by the Seljuk Empire against the Buyid dynasty
- Siege of Baghdad (1136), by the Seljuk Empire against the Abbasid Caliphate
- Siege of Baghdad (1157), by the Seljuk Empire against the Abbasid Caliphate
- Siege of Baghdad (1258), Mongol conquest of the Abbasid Caliphate
- Siege of Baghdad (1393), by the Turco-Mongol conqueror Timur
- Capture of Baghdad (1394), by the Mamluk and Jalayirid Sultanates
- Siege of Baghdad (1401), by the Turco-Mongol conqueror Timur
- Siege of Baghdad (1446), by the Jahan Shah
- Capture of Baghdad (1508), during the Safavid–Aq Qoyunlu wars
- Revolt of Zulfiqar Khan (1528-1529) , during the Ottoman–Safavid Wars
- Capture of Baghdad (1534), during the Ottoman–Safavid Wars
- Capture of Baghdad (1624), during the Ottoman–Safavid Wars
- Siege of Baghdad (1625–1626), during the Ottoman–Safavid Wars
- Siege of Baghdad (1630) during the Ottoman–Safavid Wars
- Siege of Baghdad (1638), during the Ottoman–Safavid Wars
- Siege of Baghdad (1733), during the Ottoman–Persian Wars
- Siege of Baghdad (1821), during the Ottoman–Persian Wars
- Capture of Baghdad (1831), by Ali Rıza Pasha against Dawud Pasha of the Mamluk dynasty of Iraq
- Capture of Baghdad (1917), during World War I
- Capture of Baghdad (1941), during World War II
- Operation Baghdad during the Iran-Iraq war
- Battle of Baghdad (2003), during the Iraq War
- Battle of Baghdad (2006–2008), during the Iraq War
