= Gulf War (disambiguation) =

The Gulf War (1990–1991) was an armed conflict between Iraq and a multinational military coalition led by the US, triggered by the Iraqi invasion of Kuwait in August 1990.

Gulf War may also refer to:

- Shatt al-Arab conflict (1974–1975), a series of armed cross-border skirmishes between Iran and Iraq
- Iran–Iraq War (1980–1988), an armed conflict between Iran and Iraq
- 1991 Iraqi uprisings, a series of anti-government uprisings in Iraq
- 2003 invasion of Iraq, an armed conflict between Iraq and a Western military coalition led by the US
  - Iraq War (2003–2011), a multisided armed conflict within Iraq that followed the toppling of the Iraqi government by the US' military coalition, also known as the Second Gulf War
- 2026 Iran war (2026–present), armed conflict between Iran and the US and Israel, with missile strikes occurring in many countries across the Persian Gulf region

== See also ==
- "The Golf War", a similarly-named episode of Gravity Falls
- Iraq War (disambiguation)
- Persian War (disambiguation)
- Ramadan War
