= Ramadan War =

Ramadan War may refer to either of two conflicts:

- October 1973 Ramadan War: the Yom Kippur War — a war between Israel, Egypt, Syria; occurring during October 1973
- 2026 Ramadan War: the 2026 Iran war — a war between Iran, Israel, United States of America, and other Middle Eastern states and groups; starting on 28 February 2026

== See also ==
- Operation Ramadan
- Ramadan Offensive (disambiguation)
- Ramadan Massacre
