= Muhammad Ramzan (preacher) =

Hazrat Shah Muhammad Ramzan
- Born: 1769; Meham
- Died: 1825 (aged 55–56); Madhya Pradesh
- Occupation: Scholar/Wali

Muhammad Ramzan (1769–1825) was an

Islamic scholar, Sufi saint and preacher. He worked to persuade recent converts to Islam from Hinduism to abandon Hindu customs and religious festivals and to follow Muslim ones instead.

Ramzan told converted Rajputs, Meo and Jats (Muslim Rajputs) were in no way different from their Hindu counterparts in culture, customs and celebrations of religious festivals. He also said that they were not only pir-parast and grave worshipers, they were also idolators They celebrated Holi, Diwali and other Hindu festivals with zeal and dressed in the Hindu fashion.

== Early life and death ==
Ramzan was born in Meham district Rohtak, Punjab in 1769 to Shah Abdul Azeem (d. 1828), a Majzoob Sufi. His grand father Shah Abdul Hakeem (1709- 1773) was an Urdu writer.

Ramzan was dissatisfied with the Sufi religious system under his father, whose Rajput devotees present him with a tithe from every thing taken in their raids. At age 14, Ramzan he left his family to study with Abdul Qadir and Shah Abdul Aziz Dehlavi, the sons of Shah Waliullah Dehlawi. There he studied for fourteen years (1783-1796). He has worked as a preacher throughout his life.

=== Death ===
Ramzan was killed by Bohras at Mandsaur in Madhya Pradesh after returning from "Hajj" on 18 January 1825.

== Scholarly work ==
Ramzan wrote in local language and dialects, sometime in the form of poems that could be recited and held debates with the scholars of other religious.

- Aqaid-e-Azeem
- Bulbul Bagh-e-Nabi (poetry)
- Akhir Gutt
- Rangeeli (poetry)
- Waseehat Nama
- Translation of Qaseeda Amali
- Adab Chokra (children education)
- Bohri Biaz
- Fatawa-e-Muhammadi
- Barq Laamaa Risala
- Alim o Frayz Risala Ramzani
- Radd e Rawafiz Risala (Persian)
