= Charm offensive =

Charm offensive may refer to:

- Charm. Offensive., a 2017 album by Die! Die! Die!
- Charm Offensive, a 2018 album by Damien Done
- "Charm Offensive" (Pluribus), an episode in the TV show Pluribus
- "The Charm Offensive", an episode in the TV show Ben 10
- Armando Iannucci's Charm Offensive, a BBC Radio comedy
