= Muhammad Ramzan (swimmer) =

Pakistani swimmer

Personal information
- Born: 11 December 1933 (age 92)

Sport
- Sport: Swimming

Muhammad Ramzan (born 11 December 1933) is a Pakistani former swimmer. He competed in two events at the 1952 Summer Olympics.
