= Iraq War (disambiguation) =

The Iraq War began in 2003 and involved a two-phase conflict comprising an initial invasion of Iraq led by U.S. and UK forces and a longer, eight-year phase of occupation and fighting with insurgents.

The Iraqi conflict (2003–present) that started with the 2003 to 2011 Iraq War has seen several phases of insurgency and open conflict:

- Iraqi Civil War (2006–2008), civil war mainly between sectarian militant groups and Iraqi forces and their respective allies
- Iraqi insurgency (2011–2013), the surge in violence involving the Islamic State in Iraq and the Levant (ISIL) that occurred immediately following the end of the 2003 to 2011 Iraq War
- War in Iraq (2013–2017), conflict with ISIL that began when the initial two-year-long insurgency escalated in December 2013
- ISIL insurgency in Iraq (2017–present), low-level ISIL insurgency following territorial defeat in Iraq in 2017

Iraq War may also refer to:

- Mesopotamian campaign (1914–1918)
- Iraqi revolt of 1920 against the British
- Anglo-Iraqi War (1941)
- Iran–Iraq War (1980–1988)
- Gulf War (1990–1991) (referred to by some as the First Iraq War)
- Iraqi no-fly zones conflict (1991–2003)

== See also ==
- Military history of Iraq
- Battle of Baghdad (disambiguation)
- Iraqi Civil War (disambiguation)
- Persian War (disambiguation)
- Gulf War (disambiguation)
