= Mohamed Ramadan =

Mohamed Ramadan may refer to:

- Mohamed Ramadan (fencer) (born 1931), Lebanese fencer
- Mohamed Ramadan (boxer) (born 1986), Egyptian boxer
- Mohamed Ramadan (footballer, born 1970), Egyptian footballer
- Mohamed Ramadan (footballer, born 1990), Egyptian footballer
- Mohamed Ramadan (footballer, born 1991), Swedish footballer of Lebanese descent
- Mohamed Ibrahim Ramadan (born 1984), Egyptian handballer
- Mohamed Ramadan (actor and singer) (born 1988), Egyptian actor
- Muhammad Said Ramadan al-Bouti (1929–2013), Syrian Muslim scholar
- Mohamed Ahmed Ramadan (born 1995), Egyptian karateka
