= Embassy of Turkey, Tokyo =

Diplomatic mission of Turkey in Japan

Embassy of Turkey, Tokyo 駐日トルコ共和国大使館
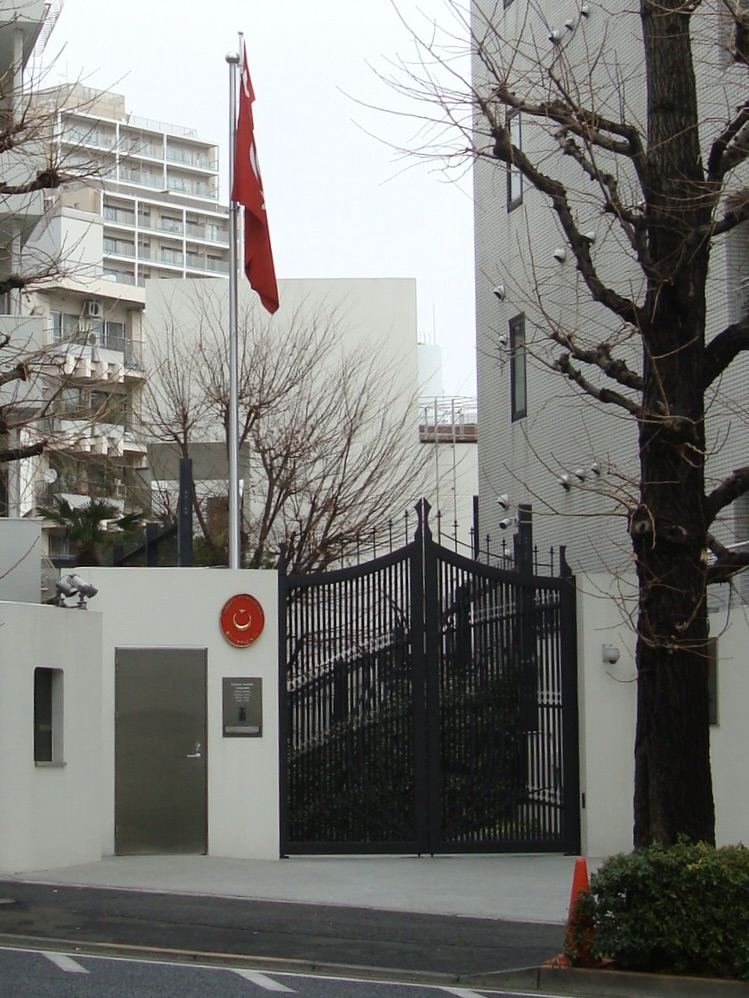
- Location: 2-33-6, Jingumae, Shibuya-ku, Tokyo 150-0
- Coordinates: 35.673278°N 139.708556°E
- Opening: 1925
- Ambassador: Korkut Güngen
- Website: Turkish Embassy - Tokyo

The Embassy of Turkey in Tokyo (Japanese: 駐日トルコ共和国大使館; Turkish: Türkiye'nin Tokyo Büyükelçiliği) is the diplomatic mission of Turkey in Japan. It was established in 1925. The Embassy Building were designed by the famous Japanese Architect Kenzō Tange.Oğuzhan Ertuğrul has been the current Ambassador since 31 December 2024.
