= Battle of Tuz Khormato =

Part of the Iraqi uprisings following the Gulf War

- Part of the 1991 uprisings in Iraq
Date	10–24 March 1991
Location	Tuz Khormato, Iraq
Result	Iraqi government victory
Territorial changes	Tuz Khormato is taken by rebels, then retaken by Iraqi government forces.

Belligerents
Iraqi government	Patriotic Union of Kurdistan; Kurdistan Democratic Party; Deserters from the Jash

Commanders and leaders
(Iraq) Saddam Hussein (Iraq) Ali Hassan al-Majid; Massoud Rajavi	Jalal Talabani; Nawshirwan Mustafa Massoud Barzani

Units involved
Republican Guard National Liberation Army of Iran	(Kurdistan Region) Peshmerga

The Battle of Tuz Khormato was fought during the 1991 uprisings in Iraq between the Peshmerga and Iraqi forces. Tuz Khormatu, a predominantly Turkmen town, was one of the most southernly towns to fall under the control of the Peshmerga then retaken by Iraqi government forces.

== Prelude ==
Tuz Khormato's importance lay in the fact that it was situated on the Baghdad–Kirkuk road, meaning that any government reinforcements to Kurdistan would have to pass through the town. The defence of Tuz Khormato was therefore given a high priority in order to defend Peshmerga positions in Kirkuk.

== Uprising ==
=== 10–12 March ===
The uprising began between 10 and 12 March. Peshmerga forces had been gathering outside of the town and had organised a plan with sympathetic residents whereby at a specific time residents would begin a massive demonstration that would be joined within 2 hours by more heavily armed Peshmerga fighters. The initial stage of the uprising also received a moral boost from the defection of local militiamen.

Most Ba'athist forces fled from the town without resistance, however the town did see fighting at the local Ba'ath Headquarters between the Peshmerga and Ba'athist officials and policemen, which resulted in the deaths of several pro-government forces.

== Government counter-offensive ==
=== 15 March ===
Three days after the town had fallen into the hands of the Peshmerga the Ba'athist loyalist forces arrived on the outskirts of the town. The army advanced on the town from three directions, but stopped 1 km short of the city, proceeding to bombard the city through use of artillery, killing large numbers of people. Peshmerga forces returned fire with mortars and RPGs.

By the fourth of fifth day of the uprising Iraqi Air Force helicopters had arrived in the area to help the army with the bombardment, and proceeded to drop napalm and phosphorus onto the town. Despite Peshmerga attempts to hit the helicopters, they were able to largely operate unmolested.

=== 17 March ===
Realising that their control of the town was unsustainable, the Peshmerga encouraged local civilians to leave before the town could fall. This resulted in up to 90% of its 150,000–200,000 residents fleeing into the mountains to the east of the town on the night of 17 March. But during this time the army did enter the city.

=== Fall of the town ===
After two weeks of bombardment, and despite a fierce resistance put up by the Peshmerga, the town fell to government forces. On the final day of the siege the Republican Guard and Special Units were deployed against the town. The Iraqi government also fired 5 or 6 missiles per minute at the town from the direction of Tikrit, resulting in up to 1/4 of the town being hit. Other sources have suggested that up to half of the town was destroyed by the fighting.
