= 2008 al-Qaeda offensive in Iraq =

- Part of Iraqi insurgency (2003–2011)
Date	15 April 2008 – 19 May 2008
Location	Iraq
Result	Indecisive

Belligerents
United States Army; New Iraqi Army	Islamic State of Iraq

Commanders and leaders
(United States) Gen. David Petraeus	Ayyub al-Masri

Strength
Coalition; 177,000; Contractors; 182,000; Iraqi Security Forces; 407,000 (180,000 Army and 227,000 Police); Awakening Council militias 65,000–80,000	850 – 1,000+

Casualties and losses
100+ soldiers, policemen and militiamen killed	Dozens of fighters and suicide bombers killed
- 250+ civilians killed

The 2008 al-Qaeda offensive in Iraq was a month-long offensive conducted by al-Qaeda in Iraq against the multinational coalition of USA, UK, Australia and Poland.

On 19 April 2008, the leader of al-Qaeda in Iraq, Ayyub al-Masri, called for a month-long offensive against U.S. and Iraqi forces. However, the offensive is generally considered to have started four days earlier, when a series of suicide bombings in four major cities killed nearly 60 people.

Shortly after al-Masri's announcement a steady bombing campaign commenced against coalition forces. The series of bombings raised fears that remaining Sunni insurgents, who were still fighting the central government, were regrouping following their major defeat during Operation Phantom Phoenix earlier that year, that left them with only one major urban stronghold in the north, in Mosul.

The offensive ended after a month with no clear gains for either side.

== Timeline of major attacks during the offensive ==
15 April 2008: In Baquba, as many as 53 people were killed and at least 70 more were wounded during a car bombing near the courthouse. A suicide bomber killed 13 people and injured 20 more outside a kebab restaurant in Ramadi. Five policemen were killed and four more were wounded during a suicide bombing at a checkpoint in the Hamidhiya area of Ramadi. In Mosul, a double car bombing killed three people and wounded at least 16 people. In Baghdad, a car bomb targeting a police patrol killed four people and wounded 15 in a central neighborhood.

17 April 2008: Near Tuz Khormato in the village of al-Bu Mohammed, at least 50 people were killed and 55 more were wounded when a suicide bomber blew up his explosives at a funeral for two U.S.-allied militia members killed a day earlier. The older bomber was dressed in traditional garb and allowed to enter the funeral freely.

18 April 2008: A suicide bomber attacked a U.S. military patrol near Tikrit killing one soldier.

21 April 2008: A female suicide bomber attacked a U.S.-allied militia post, killing four people and wounding five others in Baquba.

22 April 2008: A suicide car bomber at a checkpoint near Ramadi killed two U.S. Marines and wounded three more. Two policemen and 24 civilians were also wounded. A second car bombing, this one at a police station in the city, wounded 20 people, including women and policemen. In Jalawla, a female suicide bomber killed eight people and wounded 17 at a police station.

23 April 2008: A coordinated attack in Mosul left four dead and nine injured. First, a suicide bomber detonated his vest. When first responders arrived a car bomb blasted them.

25 April 2008: A series of bombings hit Mosul. Six people were killed, including two policemen, and five others were wounded during a suicide car bombing. Another suicide car bomber killed three and wounded six at an Iraqi army checkpoint. A suicide fuel truck bomber wounded 40 at an Iraqi army base. A car bomb in the Danadan neighborhood wounded three people.

27 April 2008: Another suicide bombing was conducted in Mosul which left four policemen dead.

29 April 2008: A female suicide bomber killed two U.S.-allied militiamen and wounded ten others in Baquba. Meanwhile, another female suicide bomber in al-Saldiya killed one person and injured five people, including the district chief.

30 April 2008: A U.S. soldier was killed in an explosion near Mosul.

1 May 2008: A female suicide bomber killed 45 people and wounded 76 others in Balad Ruz. After the bomber struck a wedding convoy, another suicide bomber targeted the first responders who arrived on the scene. A car bomb targeting a U.S. patrol killed ten and wounded 26 others near Camp Sara in Baghdad, one U.S. soldier was among the dead and three American soldiers were wounded.

2 May 2008: Insurgents infiltrated across the Syrian border into Al Anbar province and rounded up and beheaded 11 policemen, along with a son of one of them, from the al-Rimana police station in the area of the border city of Al-Qaim. Four U.S. Marines were killed when their vehicle drove over an IED in al-Anbar province. Also, two Georgian soldiers were killed by a roadside bomb in Diyala province.

5 May 2008: Insurgents attacked an Iraqi Army checkpoint in Balad Ruz killing 10 Iraqi soldiers and wounding 13.

13 May 2008: A roadside bomb in Mosul killed five Iraqi soldiers.

14 May 2008: A suicide bomber attacked a Sunni funeral west of Baghdad killing 22 people. A teenage girl, who was strapped with an explosive belt, blew up near Yusifiyah, targeting an Iraqi Army patrol, leaving an Iraqi Army captain dead and seven other soldiers wounded.

16 May 2008: A suicide car bomber attacked a Fallujah police station. Four policemen were killed and nine others were wounded.

18 May 2008: A car bomb hit an Iraqi Army patrol in the Zayouna district of Baghdad killing two soldiers and wounding four others.

19 May 2008: In the town of Baaj, 130 kilometers from Mosul, gunmen ambushed a bus carrying police recruits killing 11 of them.
