= Embassy of Japan, Ankara =

Embassy of Japan in Turkey 在トルコ日本国大使館
- Location: Resit Galip Caddesi No.81, Gaziosmanpasa 06680, Cankaya, Ankara
- Coordinates: 39.894306°N 32.869917°E
- Opening: 4 July 1953
- Ambassador: Katsumata Takahiko
- Website: Japanese Embassy - Ankara

The Embassy of Japan in Ankara (Japanese: 在トルコ日本国大使館; Turkish: Japonya'nın Ankara Büyükelçiliği) is the diplomatic mission of Japan to Turkey. Katsumata Takahiko has been the current ambassador since May 2023. The embassy was opened on 4 July 1953.
