= Ramzan Rajar =

Coordinates: 25°27′45″N 68°17′29″E

Ramzan Rajar is a village in the Jamshoro District of Pakistan.
