= Battle of Kirkuk (1991) =

Part of the Iraqi uprisings following the Gulf War

Coordinates: 35°28′0″N 44°19′0″E

- Part of 1991 uprisings in Iraq
Date	11–29 March 1991
Location	Kirkuk, Iraq
Result	Iraqi victory
Territorial changes	Kirkuk is taken fully by rebels, then re-taken by Iraqi forces

Belligerents
Iraqi government: Republican Guard; Ba'ath Party loyalist forces	(Kurdistan Region) Peshmerga: Patriotic Union of Kurdistan; Kurdistan Democratic Party; Deserters from the Jash

Commanders and leaders
(Iraq) Ali Hassan al-Majid	Jalal Talabani; Nawshirwan Mustafa Massoud Barzani

Strength
Unknown	100,000

The Battle of Kirkuk (Sorani Kurdish: جەنگی کەرکوک) was one of the biggest battles of the 1991 uprisings in Iraq.

== Prelude ==
Following the outbreak of unrest in Basra on 1 March and the spreading of conflict to other cities, Iraqi forces stationed in Kirkuk were put on alert. Kurdish neighborhoods of Kirkuk were put under a curfew and 10 March and patrols were increased throughout the city. Reinforcements were also brought in from other parts of Iraq, where the uprising had already largely been defeated, and Ali Hassan al-Majid, the leader of the Al-Anfal Campaign, was put in control of the city's security.

After the establishment of the curfew government security forces began going door to door, rounding up men who could possibly be a threat to the regime. These men were then taken to compounds outside of Kirkuk, where they were endured brutal conditions including torture, and were held until mid April whereupon most were released, although on the condition that they could not return to Kirkuk. Those detained who had military experience were not released. Most of the men detained were Kurdish, and ranged in age from early teens to their fifties. In total more than 5,000 were detained, with most making their way to Kurdish controlled Iraq after their release.

== Aftermath ==
Following the failed uprising the government expelled over 120,000 Kurds from Ba'athist controlled Northern Iraq, with the majority of those expelled being from Kirkuk and the surrounding villages.

== See also ==
- Kirkuk executions (1991)
- Iraqi-Kurdish conflict
