= Ramadan Offensive (2006) =

Attacks in Iraq during Ramadan in 2006

- Part of the Iraq War
Date	23 September 2006 – 22 October 2006
Location	Iraq
Result	Insurgent victory
Territorial changes	Most of Baghdad, Al Anbar province and Babil province come under insurgent control

Belligerents
United States; United Kingdom; Denmark; El Salvador	Mujahideen Shura Council: Al-Qaeda in Iraq

Commanders and leaders
(United States) Gen. George Casey	Abu Omar al-Baghdadi; Abu Hamza al-Muhajir

Strength
(United States) 10,000+ soldiers (Iraq) 6,000+ soldiers (United Kingdom) 2,500+ soldiers (Denmark) 500 soldiers (El Salvador) 200 soldiers	1,500+ soldiers

Casualties and losses
(United States) 194 killed (Iraq) 119 killed (United Kingdom) 2 killed (Denmark) 2 killed (El Salvador) 1 killed	Unknown

The Ramadan Offensive refers to the attacks mounted by insurgents in Iraq during the holy Muslim month of Ramadan in 2006, three years after the original Ramadan Offensive.

Among the targets were U.S., Iraqi and other Coalition military targets, but many civilians were also killed by death squads. Most of the civilian killings were conducted by the Mahdi Army who were seeking to purge the Sunni population of Baghdad. The offensive coincided with a Coalition operation called Together Forward which was to significantly reduce the violence in Baghdad which had seen a sharp uprise since the mid-February 2006 bombing of the Askariya Mosque, a major Shia Muslim shrine, in Samarra. However, the operation failed. Moreover, the insurgents managed take control of more than 80 percent of Baghdad. Also insurgents made huge gains in the western Al Anbar and southern Babil province, forcing Coalition and Iraqi security forces from many towns and cities. This period also saw the battle of Amarah, during which rogue Mahdi Army fighters fought with the police, who were members of the Badr Organisation, for control of the southern city of Amarah.
