= Hideo Yoritaka =

Japanese politician and mayor

- 賴髙 英雄

Mayor of Warabi
- Incumbent
- Assumed office 6 June 2007
- Preceded by: Keiichi Tanaka

Member of the Warabi City Council
- In office June 1991 – June 2003

Personal details
- Born: 10 October 1963 (age 62) Warabi, Saitama, Japan
- Party: Communist
- Education: Saitama University

Hideo Yoritaka (頼高 英雄, Yoritaka Hideo; born 10 October 1963) is a Japanese politician and the current mayor of the city of Warabi in Saitama Prefecture. He was first elected in 2007 and was re-elected most recently for a fifth term in 2023, defeating a candidate from the Liberal Democratic Party. He is a member of the Japanese Communist Party.
