= Maham =

Meham Meham
- Town, small city
- Location in Haryana, India Meham (India)
- Coordinates: 28.98°N 76.3°E
- Country: India
- State: Haryana
- District: Rohtak

Area
  - Total: 236.73 km^{2} (91.40 sq mi)
- Elevation: 214 m (702 ft)

Population (2020)
  - Total: 82,858
  - Density: 350/km^{2} (910/sq mi)

Languages
  - Official: Hindi, Regional Haryanvi
- Time zone: UTC+5:30 (IST)
- Postal code: 124112
- ISO 3166 code: IN-HR
- Vehicle registration: HR 15
- Website: haryana.gov.in

Meham, also spelled Maham, is a small city in Rohtak district of the Indian state of Haryana. It is one of the two sub-divisions in Rohtak district. As a tehsil, it is further divided into two community development blocks, Maham and Lakhan-Majra.

== Geography ==
Maham's coordinates are 28.98°N 76.3°E. It has an average elevation of 214 metres (702 feet). Situated on Indian National Highway 9, it is a major stop between the cities Delhi and Sirsa in the Haryana state of India.

== Demographics ==
Maham town is situated in the Rohtak district of Haryana, a main subdivision of the Rohtak district in its west, thirty kilometers from the city of Rohtak. It has its own municipality and a constituency for the Haryana Legislative Assembly. There are about 30 villages in Maham. Furthermore, has its own Mini Secretariat situated on Rohtak Road in the eastern part of the city.

The 2001 Indian census, reported that Maham had a population of 18,166. Males constitute 54% of the population; females, 46%. Maham has an average literacy rate of 66%, higher than the national average of 59.5%: male literacy is 72%, and female literacy is 59%. 15% of the population is under six years of age. Its entire urban area had a population of 20,483. 10,817 are males; 9,661 are females; and 5 are others.

== Indus Valley Civilization sites ==
There are large sand dunes about five kilometers away on the city's western fringe. In ancient times, the area's name was Mahahattam. About two big ponds and a dozen smaller ones were created by the Indus Valley Civilisation to trap runoff rainwater in them, which could last for a full year until the next rainfall replenished the supply. There are a few myths of that culture that concern the area of Maham. Archaeological excavations in the region on land about the area of a dozen village estates have yielded well-documented finds, which have shed light on the pre-Harappan settlements, particularly at Madina and Farmana Khas. Dr. Vasant Shinde of the Deccan College in Pune, Dr. Manmohan Singh of Maharshi Dayanand University in Rohtak, and other Japanese scientists explored these archaeological finds.

== Early history ==
Maham suffered a setback during the invasion of the Ghaznavids under the command of Sultan Mahmud (lived 971 – 1030 AD) and later when his son Mas'ud I (998 – 1040 AD) sacked the town. A few centuries later, during the reign of the Turkic Muslim ruler Firuz Shah Tughlaq (1309 – 1388 AD), the town was resettled, and agricultural operations resumed.

== Maham during Mughal rule ==
Maham was a thriving town during the Mughal Empire.

=== Maham Fort ===
The Mughals posted a garrison commander at Maham and built a small fort that is now in complete ruins except for its ramparts.

=== Shahjahan ki Baoli ===
Shahjahan ki Baoli, colloquially known as Choro ki Baoli (thieves' stepwell) and Jyani Chor ki Surang (Jayani the thief's tunnel), was built from 1558 to 1559 CE by Mughal courtier Saidu Kalal during the reign of Shah Jahan (reigned 1628 – 1658 CE). It is an old Baoli (stepwell) made of lakhori bricks with 101 steps. Several rooms in the subterranean pavilion flank both sides of the well's steps. Now it lies in partial ruins and faces neglect.

=== Mosques ===
Two masjids (mosques), Jama Masjid and Pirzada Masjid, were built during the Mughal era and are currently in ruins. Parts of them have been demolished by the villagers and used for making, drying and storing hand-made dried cow dung cakes (called Uple उपले in Hindi and Gosse गोस्से in Haryanvi) or as fuel in Chulha (stoves) for cooking.

=== Tomb of Shah Muhammad Ramzan Mahami and Shah Ghulam Hussain Mahami (Takht Walay) ===
The tombs of Shah Muhammad Ramzan Mahami and Shah Ghulam Hussain Mahami (Takht Walay) of Mughal times are both in partial ruins. That of the latter, a Muslim saint, has been partially restored by locals. Religious structures have been erected near it.

== Maham during British Raj ==
Maham had a considerable Muslim population before the partition of India after Independence from the UK. The partition led to a mass exodus of Muslims of the peoples of the Pathan, Baloch and Moola Jats migrated to the newly formed Muslim nation of Pakistan in 1947. Now, Maham is mostly a Hindu town.

== Transport ==
The small city is well-connected to all nearby cities through bus transport although there is connectivity for railways. Single line of railway lines connecting Rohtak and Hansi is operational now, which also provides transportation for Maham. There is a proposal to establish a cargo airport at Maham, approved by Aviation Minister Ajit Singh. Because Maham is located near National Highway 9 and Delhi, it is a popular place for businesses.

== Recreation ==
There is a park named Huda Park. There is also a stadium for playing games. The government high school, New Anaj Mandi; Sisar/Bhiwani Road; Kheri/Gohana Road; and Hissar Road are popular among morning walkers.
