= Turks in Japan =

Ethnic group in Japan

Turks in Japan Japonya Türkleri 在日トルコ人（ざいにちトルコじん）
Total population
- 7,919 (in December, 2025)

Languages
- Turkish · Japanese

Religion
- Predominantly Sunni Islam; Minority Alevism, other religions, or irreligious
- Population figure given is for citizens of Turkey living in Japan. The Turkish Embassy gives a lower figure of 2,264 (2006); however, this counts only citizens who have voluntarily registered at the embassy.

Turks in Japan (Japanese: 在日トルコ人（ざいにちトルコじん）; Turkish: Japonya Türkleri) are Turks living in Japan. Historically, the term has included Turkic (particularly Volga Tatar) émigrés and immigrants from the former Russian Empire, most of whom later acquired Turkish citizenship.

== History ==
In the early 20th century, groups of Tatars immigrated from Kazan, Russia, to Japan. The community became led by the Bashkir émigré imam Muhammed-Gabdulkhay Kurbangaliev, who had fought on the side of the White movement in the Russian Civil War and arrived in Japan in 1924; he then set up an organisation (Note: Known in Japanese as the 東京回教団 (Tokyō Kaikyōdan)) to bring together the Tatars living in Tokyo. Tatars in Japan founded their first mosque and school in 1935 in Kobe and another in Tokyo in 1938, with support from Kurbangaliev's organisation. Another Tatar organisation, the Mohammedan Printing Office in Tokyo, (Note: Tatar: Tokyo'da Mätbää-i İslamiyä; Japanese: 東京回教印刷所 (Tōkyō Kaikyō Insatsusho)) printed the first Qur'an in Japan as well as a Tatar language magazine in Arabic script, the Japan Intelligencer; (Note: Tatar: Yapon mohbiri) it continued publication until the 1940s. Most of the Tatars emigrated after World War II. Those remaining took up Turkish citizenship in the 1950s. But there are 600-2,000 Tatars in Japan. Today, they are almost mixed with the Japanese locals.

Though the Turkish community has diminished in size, those remaining founded the Tokyo Camii and Turkish Cultural Center in 2000. In the following decade, there was a new wave of migration from Turkey, mostly consisting of people from the Fatsa area.

Some Turkish citizens in Japan are ethnic Kurds.

In 2015, a clash took place outside the Turkish embassy in Tokyo between Kurds and Turks, it was claimed that this began when Turks and Kurds got into a quarrel after a Kurdish party flag was shown at the embassy.

== Prominent Turks (Volga Tatars) in Japan ==
- Osman Yusuf (A.K.A. Johnny Yuseph, 1920 - 1982): Actor
- Abdul Hannan Safa (A.K.A. Roy James, 1929 - 1982): Actor, naturalised in 1971
- Ömer Yusuf (A.K.A. Yusef Toruko ("Yusuf the Turk"), 1930 - 2013): Puroresu referee and actor, brother of Osman Yusuf

== Gallery ==
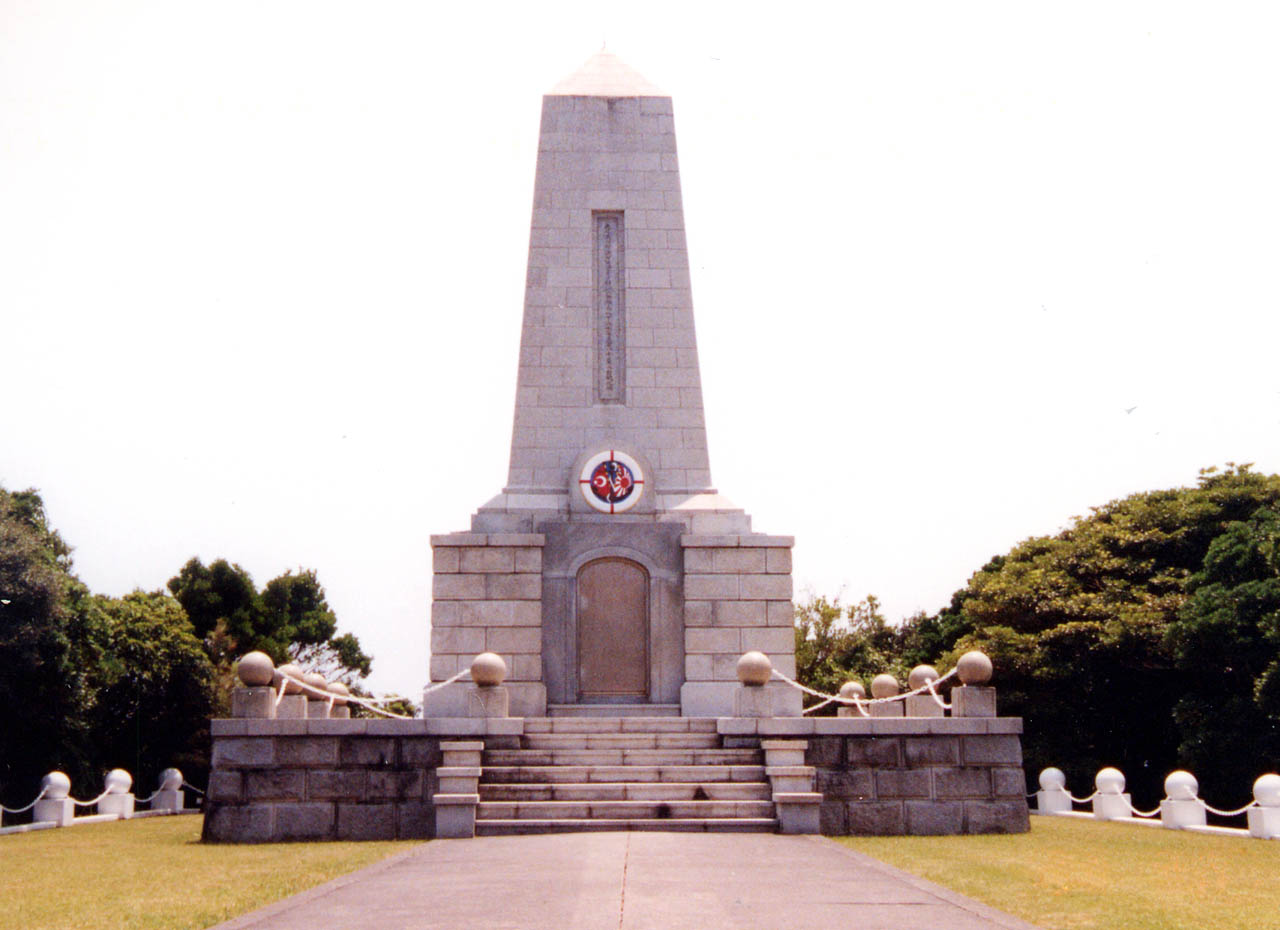
Memorial to the Turkish victims of the sunken ship in Japan

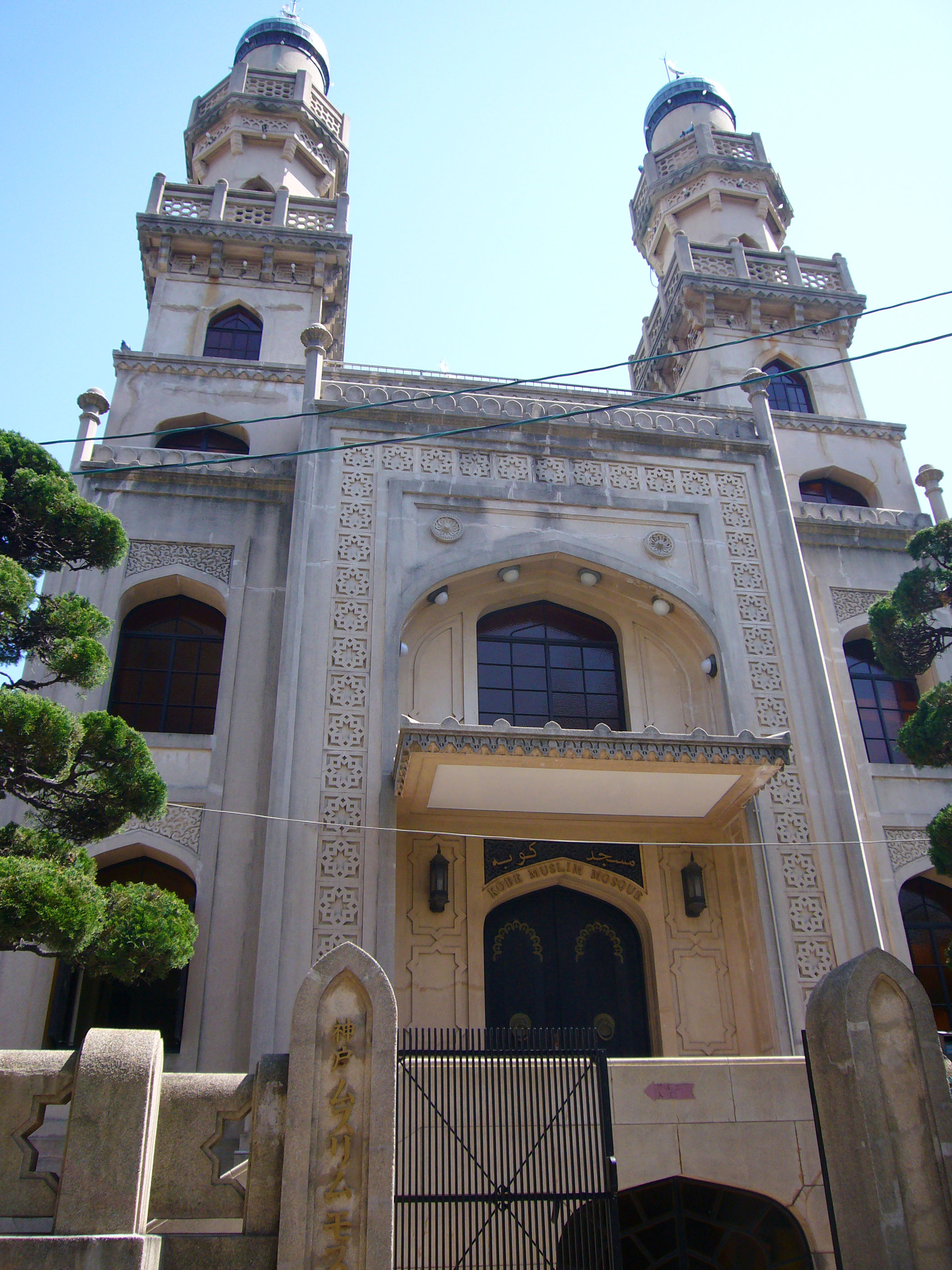
Kobe Mosque

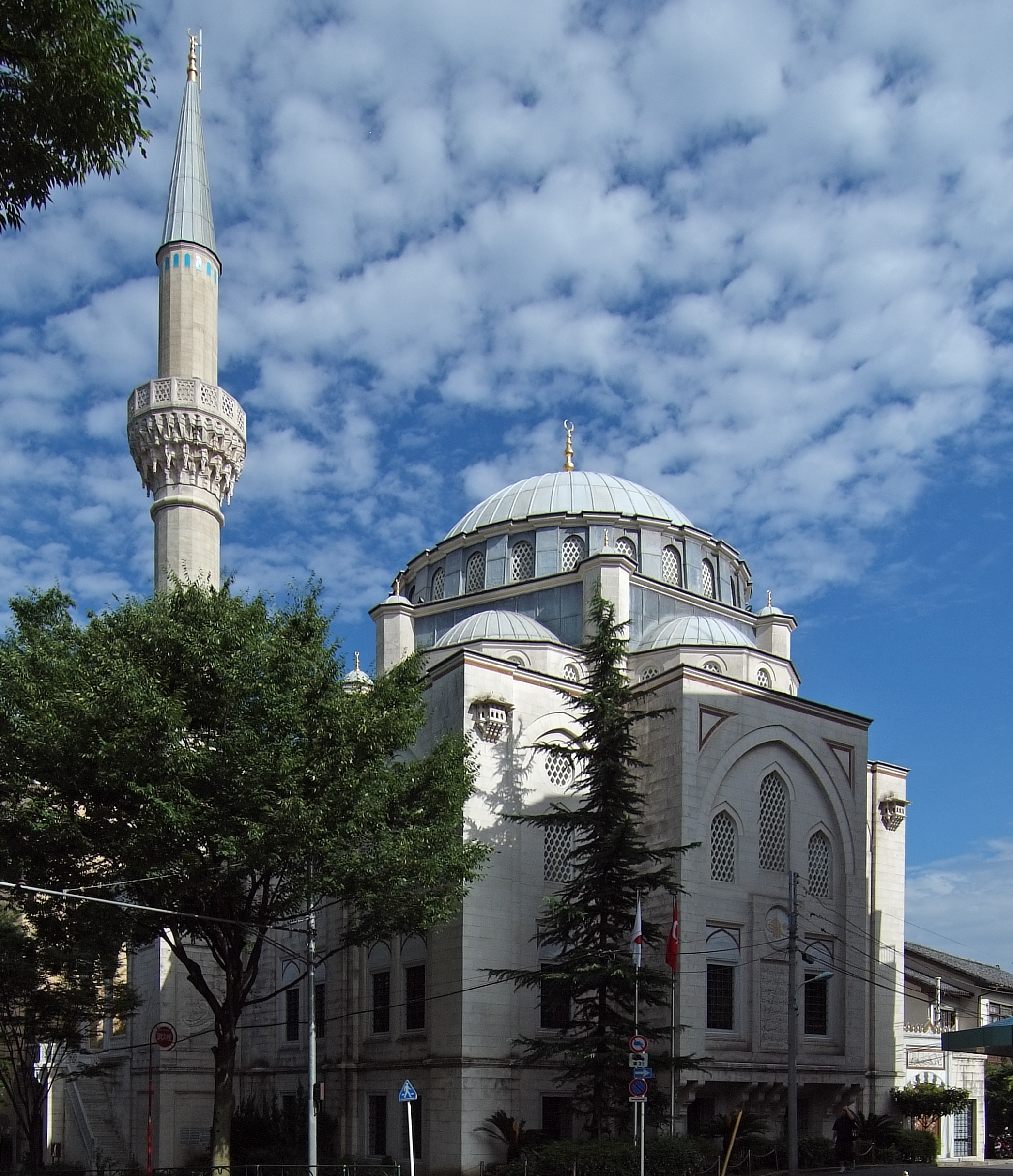
Tokyo Mosque with Turkish Culture Center was re-built by Turkish Directorate of Religious Affairs in 2000

== See also ==
- Japan–Turkey relations
- Islam in Japan
- Tatars
- Volga Tatars
- Japanese people in Turkey
