= Ramjannagar Union =

Union in Khulna, Bangladesh

Ramjannagar Union রমজাননগর ইউনিয়ন
- Union
- Location in Bangladesh
- Coordinates: 22.2427°N 89.0885°E
- Country: Bangladesh
- Division: Khulna Division
- District: Satkhira District
- Upazila: Shyamnagar Upazila

Government
  - Type: Union council
- Time zone: UTC+6 (BST)
- Website: ramjannagarup.satkhira.gov.bd

Ramjannagar Union (Bengali: রমজাননগর ইউনিয়ন) is a union parishad in Shyamnagar Upazila of Satkhira District, in Khulna Division, Bangladesh.
