= Ramadan Offensive (2003) =

Part of the Iraqi insurgency (2003–2011)

- Part of the Iraqi insurgency (2003–2011)
Date	26 October 2003 – 24 November 2003 (4 weeks and 1 day)
Location	Republic of Iraq
Result	Insurgent victory: Higher-than-average casualties inflicted on civilians, government personnel, and coalition forces

Belligerents
United States; Iraq (CPA); Italy; United Kingdom; Poland	Iraqi insurgents

Commanders and leaders
Gen. John Abizaid	Various

Casualties and losses
75 killed; 50+ killed; 17 killed; 1 killed; 1 killed	100+ killed

During the Iraq War, the Ramadan Offensive of the Iraqi insurgency marked a sharp increase in the number of violent attacks against the American-led military coalition in Iraq and also against the new Iraqi government, beginning in the end of October 2003 and persisting for most of November 2003.

The heightened series of attacks coincided with Ramadan, the ninth month of the Islamic calendar, during which Muslims fast from sunrise until sunset in commemoration of Muhammad's first revelation in 610 CE. The number of insurgent attacks increased during this period mainly because of the popular belief among insurgents that engaging in jihad during the holy month of Ramadan would bring them spiritually closer to Allah, especially so if they were killed by the occupying powers.

== Major attacks ==
=== Red Cross headquarters, Iraqi police stations, and al-Rashid Hotel ===
On the morning of October 26, 2003, the first day of Ramadan, suicide bombers drove 5 carloads of explosives into 5 buildings, the headquarters of the International Committee of the Red Cross and four Iraqi police stations, as the insurgent offensive began. That morning, in the early hours in Baghdad, insurgents fired an improvised multiple-tube launcher mounted in a trailer that was made up to look like a mobile generator, about 400 meters from the al-Rashid Hotel, where U.S. Deputy Defense Secretary Paul Wolfowitz was staying. Eight to ten rockets hit the hotel killing one U.S. soldier and wounding 15 people, including seven American civilians and four soldiers. Several more rockets were fired but missed their target. Wolfowitz was on the 12th floor of the hotel, which houses U.S. and coalition officials in Baghdad, and on the side of the hotel that came under attack. The rockets reached only as high as the 11th floor.

==== Baghdad suicide bombings at the Red Cross compound ====
At the start of the offensive on October 27, 2003, insurgents staged a coordinated suicide attack targeting the Red Cross compound, and four Iraqi police stations in Baghdad. The bombings occurred within about 45 minutes of each other. Four suicide bombers died but the fifth, a Syrian, who attempted to blow up the fourth police station failed after the man's car apparently failed to explode. He was shot and wounded by the Iraqi police and arrested. The attacks killed 35 people and injured 244. Among the dead were two U.S. soldiers.

=== Italian MSU headquarters suicide bombing ===
On November 12, 2003, a suicide bomber in a tanker truck attacked the Italian military police headquarters in Nasiriyah destroying it and killing 28 people, including 17 Italian soldiers and 2 Italian civilians.

The attack was the worst incident involving Italian soldiers since Operation Restore Hope in Somalia and the highest loss of Italian soldiers since World War II. The attack shocked Italy and plunged it into a three-day mourning period. The soldiers were given a state funeral.

=== Shootdowns of American helicopters ===
During this time, a number of U.S. military helicopters were shot down resulting in a large number of casualties inflicted on the U.S. forces. Three UH-60 Black Hawks and one CH-47D Chinook were downed, killing 39 soldiers and wounding 31. Two of the helicopters were downed using Strela missile launchers that most likely ended up in the hands of the insurgents via the black market.

A day before the start of the offensive, on 25 October 2003 another UH-60 Black Hawk was shot down, wounding 5 soldiers.

== Aftermath ==
Many people compared the Ramadan Offensive with the Tet Offensive of 1968 in the Vietnam War. In 1968, the attacks came at the onset of the Vietnamese New Year, a holiday that American command believed would herald a temporary quieting of the violence. In Iraq, these attacks came at the beginning of the Muslim holy month of Ramadan.

The American command in Baghdad believed the holiday would bring a slacking of the attacks that had been plaguing American forces. This assumption ran so strong that the Baghdad curfew was partially lifted by American forces. The most pointed similarity was clear in that these attacks were meant to cause a political reaction.
