= Ōshima =

Ōshima, Oshima, Ooshima or Ohshima may refer to:

== Places ==
- Ōshima (大島; lit. "big island") (sorted by prefecture):
  - Ōshima (Aomori), an island in Hiranai and a part of Asamushi-Natsudomari Prefectural Natural Park
  - Nii Ōshima Island, part of Niihama in Ehime Prefecture
  - Ōshima (Ehime), an island connected by the Hakata-Ōshima Bridge and the Kurushima-Kaikyo Bridge
  - Ōshima (Fukuoka), an island in Genkai Sea of Fukuoka, Japan
  - Ōshima, Fukuoka, a former village in Munakata District, which became part of the city of Munakata, Fukuoka in 2005
  - Amami Ōshima in Kagoshima Prefecture
  - Ōshima District, Kagoshima
  - Ōshima Subprefecture (Kagoshima)
  - Ōshima (Miyazaki), and island off the coast of Nichinan, Miyazaki Prefecture
  - Ōshima, Nagasaki (Kitamatsuura), former village in Kitamatsura district
  - Ōshima, Nagasaki (Nishisonogi), former town in Nishisonogi district
  - Ōshima, Nagasaki (Nishisonogi), town merged in 2005 into Saikai, Nagasaki
  - Ōshima, Niigata
  - Ōshima Subprefecture (Tokyo)
  - Izu Ōshima, one of the Izu Islands in Tokyo
  - Ōshima, Toyama
  - Kii Ōshima in Wakayama Prefecture
  - Ōshima District, Yamaguchi, which includes:
    - Ōshima, Yamaguchi, a former town in Oshima District, Yamaguchi, now part of Suō-Ōshima, Yamaguchi
  - Oshima (Hokkaido), an island in the Sea of Japan belonging to Matsumae, Hokkaidō
- Oshima (渡島, Oshima):
  - Oshima Province, former province located in Hokkaidō
  - Oshima Subprefecture, a subprefecture of Hokkaidō
  - Oshima Peninsula, the geographical area on which the subprefecture is located
- Oshima (冠島, Oshima) in the Oomoto religion
  - Kanmurijima in Kyoto Prefecture

== Other uses ==
- Ōshima (surname)
- Oshima Brothers, an American folk-pop music duo
- Japanese gunboat Ōshima - a warship of the early Imperial Japanese Navy
- Ōshima stable, a stable of sumo wrestlers
- Amami Ōshima language, spoken in the Ryukyu Islands

== See also ==
- Ōshima Subprefecture (disambiguation)
- Not to be confused with Osimo, Italy
