= Shotaro Noda =

Japanese journalist (1868–1904)

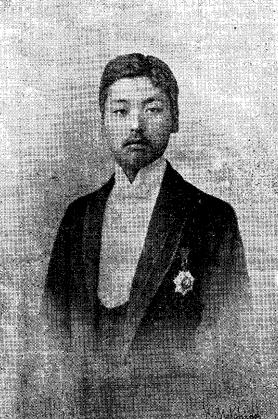
Portrait of Noda published in the Resimli Gazete (1891).

Shōtarō Noda (Japanese: 野田 正太郎 Noda Shōtarō, 1868 – 27 April 1904) was a Japanese journalist who is thought to be the first known Japanese convert to Islam.

== Biography ==
Noda in Hachinohe, Aomori Prefecture as the eldest son of a feudal lord named Okude. After graduating from Keio University, he became a journalist for Fukuzawa Yukichi's Jiji Shinpō newspaper. On the 16th of September, 1890, the Ottoman frigate named Ertuğrul shipwrecked off the coast of Kushimoto, Wakayama Prefecture. Many donations were collected to help these Ottoman sailors through Jiji Shinpō advertisements, and Noda accompanied the crew on the trip back to Constantinople, which was facilitated through the battleships Hiei.and Kongō. Sultan Abdul Hamid II asked for a Japanese individual to stay behind and teach the Japanese language at the Army War College. The naval officers declined and instead recommended Noda, as he was a civilian, and Noda was employed in this manner for two years. During his stay, he intermittently sent back articles to Japan concerning his stay.

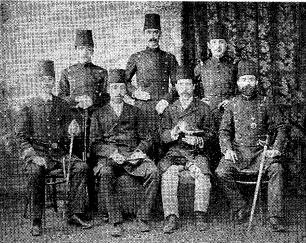
Noda with five Ottoman students as well as Yamada Torajirō (c. 1892).

While staying there, he helped teach Japanese to a few military officers who, in turn, helped Noda learn Turkish. Noda became a Muslim during his stay, and an official document which was presented to the Sultan and dated his conversion to 21 May 1891 remains intact in the Ottoman archives. This document also states that he learned Islamic and Ottoman history and that he took on the name Abdülhalim. He also underwent circumcision as well. This resulted in a number of reports about his conversion in Ottoman newspapers of the time, but for unknown reasons Noda did not mention his own conversion in the intermittent reports he sent back to Japan. He also asked the Sultan to be taught Arabic and had plans of studying the Qu'ran itself. Around this time, Noda had interactions with Yamada Torajirō, another early convert. Noda left Constantinople in December of 1892, and in the process he traveled through Europe, the Atlantic Ocean, and the United States, where he attended the World's Columbian Exposition in 1893. He made it back to Japan sometime around March 1893. Yamada did not mention Noda in his autobiography, and as a result it is possible that some aspects of Noda's life had been misattributed to that of Yamada's.

After returning to Japan, he continued to write intermittently for the Jiji Shinpō until August 1893, and at some point in his later career, he became associated with the Miyako Shinbun. After returning to Japan, Noda apparently fell away from the strict Islamic life and began to frequent ryōtei restaurants, known for hosting geisha. He was also involved in two criminal cases, eventually faded into obscurity and passed away despite only being in his mid-thirties. A grandson of his named Yasuo Noda was still living in Hachinohe in 2002 and relayed some personal information about his grandfather to researchers. Despite this, however, Noda has been credited as an early figure in establishing warm relations between Japan and Turkey.

== See also ==
- Islam in Japan
- Yamada Torajirō
- Japan–Turkey relations
