= Japanese munition ship Kashino =

WWII Japanese naval vessel

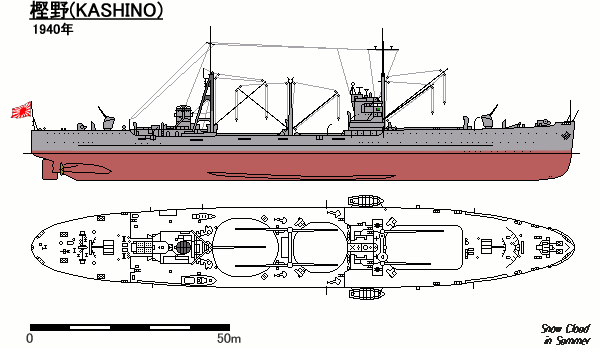
- A line drawing of Kashino as she appeared in 1940

History

Empire of Japan
- Name: Kashino
- Namesake: Cape Kashino
- Builder: Mitsubishi Heavy Industries, Nagasaki
- Laid down: 1 July 1939
- Launched: 26 January 1940
- Commissioned: 10 July 1940
- Fate: Sunk, 4 September 1942

General characteristics
- Type: Ammunition ship
- Tonnage: 10,360 tons
- Length: 451 ft (137 m)
- Beam: 61 ft 6 in (18.75 m)
- Draught: 21 ft 8 in (6.60 m)
- Propulsion: 1 × BBC all geared turbine; 2 × La-Mont boilers; 2 × Kampon Ho-Gō boilers; 2 shafts, 4,500 shp (3,400 kW)
- Speed: 14 knots (26 km/h; 16 mph)
- Range: 6,000 nmi (11,000 km; 6,900 mi) at 14 kn (26 km/h; 16 mph)
- Capacity: 5,800 tons freight; 260 passengers
- Complement: 303
- Armament: 2 x Type 10 120 mm AA guns; 2 x twin 13.2 mm (0.52 in) machine guns
- Notes: Ship characteristics from

Kashino (樫野) was a unique ammunition ship operated by the Imperial Japanese Navy from 1940 until she was sunk by a United States Navy submarine in 1942. She was built to carry the Yamato-class battleship's main battery from the Kure Naval Arsenal to the shipyards where the battleships were being constructed. When the ships were completed, Kashino was converted to carry ammunition and other supplies.

== Service history ==
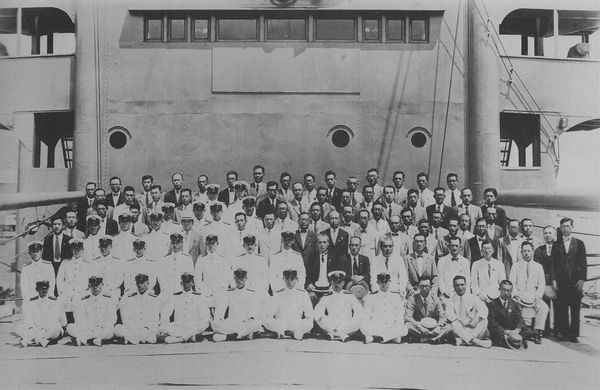
The crew of Kashino on 10 July 1940

Kashino was specifically designed and constructed to transport the Yamato-class battleships' 46 cm (18.1 in) guns and turrets from Kure Naval Arsenal to the other shipyards where the battleships were being built. The ship was required as the guns were too large and heavy to be moved by land and could not be carried by conventional cargo ships. She was equipped with two large cargo holds which could embark the turrets, and required more ballast than comparable ships to provide stability when she was not carrying these heavy loads.

Kashino was built at the Mitsubishi Heavy Industries shipyard in Nagasaki. She was laid down on 1 July 1939, launched on 26 January 1940 and entered service on 10 July that year. She was initially rated as an "auxiliary turret conveyance warship".

The ship made her first voyage from Kure to Nagasaki in October transporting one of Musashi's turrets and a gun. The turret and gun were covered by a canvas after being hoisted onto the battleship as a security measure. Following this voyage, Kashino regularly transported ordnance and supplies between Kure and Nagasaki.

While Japan had originally intended to build at least three Yamato-class battleships, it was decided in June 1942 to complete the third ship, Shinano, as an aircraft carrier. As no other battleships were under construction, the Navy did not need a ship capable of carrying gun turrets, and so Kashino was converted to an ammunition transport by covering her holds. When this work was completed she was used to transport ammunition and other supplies until 4 September 1942, when she was torpedoed and sunk by the submarine USS Growler north-east of Formosa (Taiwan) at 25°45′N 122°42′E.
