= Yamada Torajirō =

Japanese merchant and tea master

Yamada Torajirō 山田 寅次郎
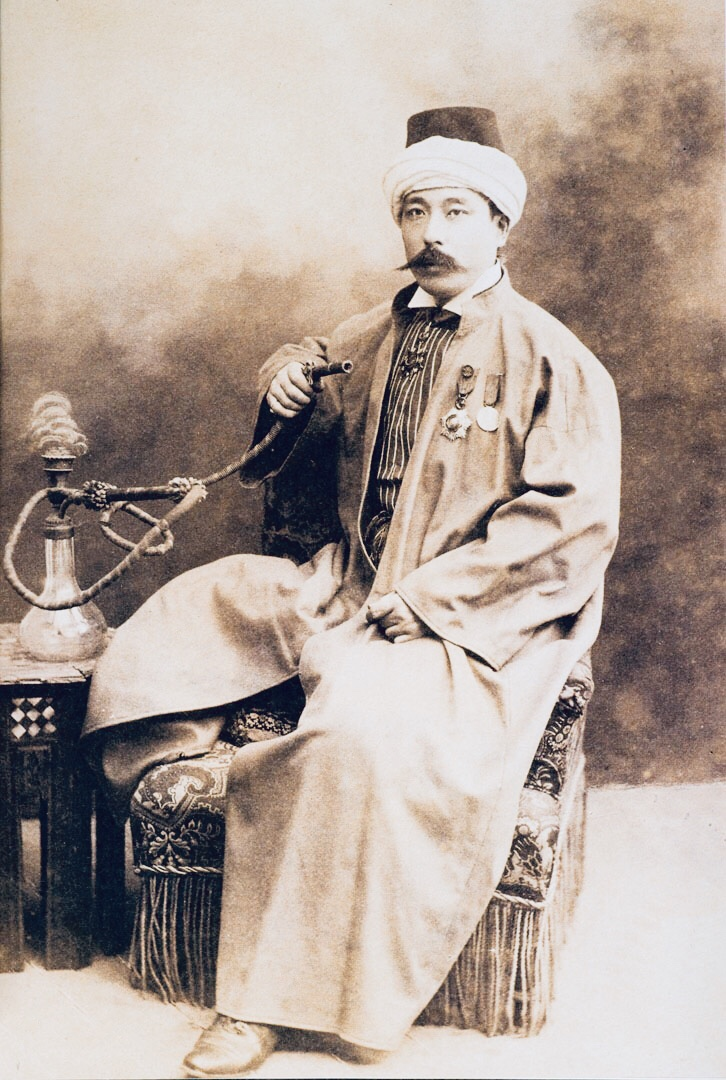
- Torajirō circa 1892 to 1914 while in Istanbul
- Born: 23 August 1866; Edo, Tokugawa shogunate
- Died: 13 February 1957 (aged 90); Japan
- Other name: Yamada Sōyū (山田 宗有)
- Occupations: Tea master, businessman, author

Yamada Torajirō (Japanese: 山田寅次郎, Hiragana: やまだ とらじろう; 23 August 1866 – 13 February 1957) was a Japanese businessman and tea master who is considered to have laid the foundation of Japanese–Turkish relations. He took the name Yamada Sōyū when he became a tea ceremony master, Iemoto (Japanese: 山田宗有), after 1923.

He arrived in Istanbul in 1892, where he donated to the families of the victims of the sinking of the Turkish frigate Ertuğrul. He remained there for 13 years, finally going back to Japan in 1905. Although he was not able to ensure Japanese political or economic interests in Istanbul, his activity was the beginning of a period of intensification of contact between the two countries. He acted as an Honorary Consul, helped introduce the Turks to Japanese culture and wrote many books about Turkey after returning to Japan. His work is considered a fundamental basis of amicable Japan–Turkey relations.

== Early life ==
Born in Edo in the residence of the Numata Domain (now Gunma Prefecture)'s daimyō, Yamada was the son of Nakamura Yūzaemon. His family was a high-ranking samurai family who moved to Edo when Yamada was seven. At the age of fifteen, he was adopted by a tea master named Yamada, whom he took the surname of. He studied the Japanese tea ceremony in schools in Edo and Yokohama as well as the Chinese, English, German and French languages.

== Ertuğrul incident ==
In 1889, the Ottoman Empire sent the frigate Ertuğrul under the authority of Rear Admiral Ali Osman Pasha for a courtesy visit to Japan. However, the Ertuğrul sank off the coast of Wakayama Prefecture in the night of September 16, 1890. With more than 500 crew members dead, it was one of the largest sea accidents in history at that time. Yamada initiated a nationwide donation campaign, organized together with the newspapers Osaka Asahi Shimbun, Tokyo Nichi Nichi Shimbun, Kobe Yushin Nippo, and Jiji Shimpo. Over two years, Yamada collected 5000 yen (currently worth 100 million yen) from donors. This campaign is considered to be the first international relief campaign of the Japanese Red Cross Society.

In order to deliver the collected money, Foreign Minister Aoki Shūzō advised Yamada to go to Turkey in person. Yamada thus left for Istanbul on January 30, 1892, from the port of Yokohama. He sailed on the British ship Pasan, tasked with bringing back Japanese battleship Matsujima, then under construction in Lyon, France, for the Imperial Japanese Navy. During this period, Yamada teamed up with Nakamura Kenjirō, a former naval officer from an Osaka family that traded clothing and fabrics. Both men were interested in opening trade and starting good relations with the Ottoman Empire.

== Arrival in Istanbul ==
On 4 April 1892, Yamada arrived in Istanbul. He met Ottoman Foreign Minister Muhammad Said Pasha and gave the donated money to him. He offered Sultan Abdülhamid II some Nakamura family goods, including samurai armor, a helmet, and a sword. The sultan asked him to stay in Turkey for two years. The two built a close relationship. With the help of Shōtarō Noda, Yamada began to teach Japanese to army cadets. The future President of the Republic of Turkey, Mustafa Kemal Atatürk, is said to have been one of his students. He returned briefly to Japan in 1893 aboard the Matsujima. On April 16, at the suggestion of Foreign Minister Enomoto Takeaki, Yamada gave a lecture at the seminary of the Japanese Colonial Association (Shokuminkyōkai) on the Ottoman Empire and Egypt, reflecting Japan's new interest in expanding its trade network in the region.

== Commercial activity in Istanbul ==
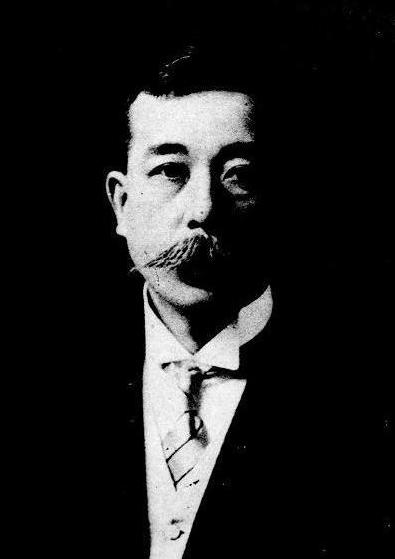
A picture of Yamada in a suit

In Summer of 1893, Yamada left Kobe to return to Istanbul, where he founded the store Nakamura Shoten with Nakamura Kenjirō. At the time, they were the only two permanent residents of Japanese ethnicity in Istanbul. Despite the fact that Japanese subjects had no legal status in the city due to the lack of official diplomatic relations between the Ottoman Empire and Japan, they received permission from the Ottoman government to run their business. Yamada formed good relations with the Istanbul Chamber of Commerce (İstanbul Ticaret Odası) who authorized him to run his business as a "commercial museum" according to an Ottoman law promulgated in 1890. He also became a friend of Spirakis Alexandritis, the General Secretary of the Chamber and publisher of the Bulletin of the Oriental Directory, with whom Yamada continued to communicate even after his return to Japan decades later.

Yamada obtained authorization to sell Japanese products such as silk, porcelain, tea, and wooden objects in a room in the Chamber of Commerce before renting a shop on Pera Street to set up Nakamura Shoten. Over the years, the shop became and important place for Japanese people visiting Istanbul. It first opened at Hazzopulo Pass on 19 Pera Street, and later moved to the Beyoğlu District. The sultan and members of the Ottoman dynasty particularly valued Japanese-manufactured goods as well as Japanese household and decorative items, becoming important customers of the store. Japanese products became a trend in Istanbul, partly because of the arrival of Japanophilia in Europe but also because of the growing admiration of Japan by the Turks. The current collections of Dolmabahçe Palace, Topkapi Palace, and other palaces in Istanbul hold many items sold at Nakamura Shoten.

== Correspondence with Japan ==
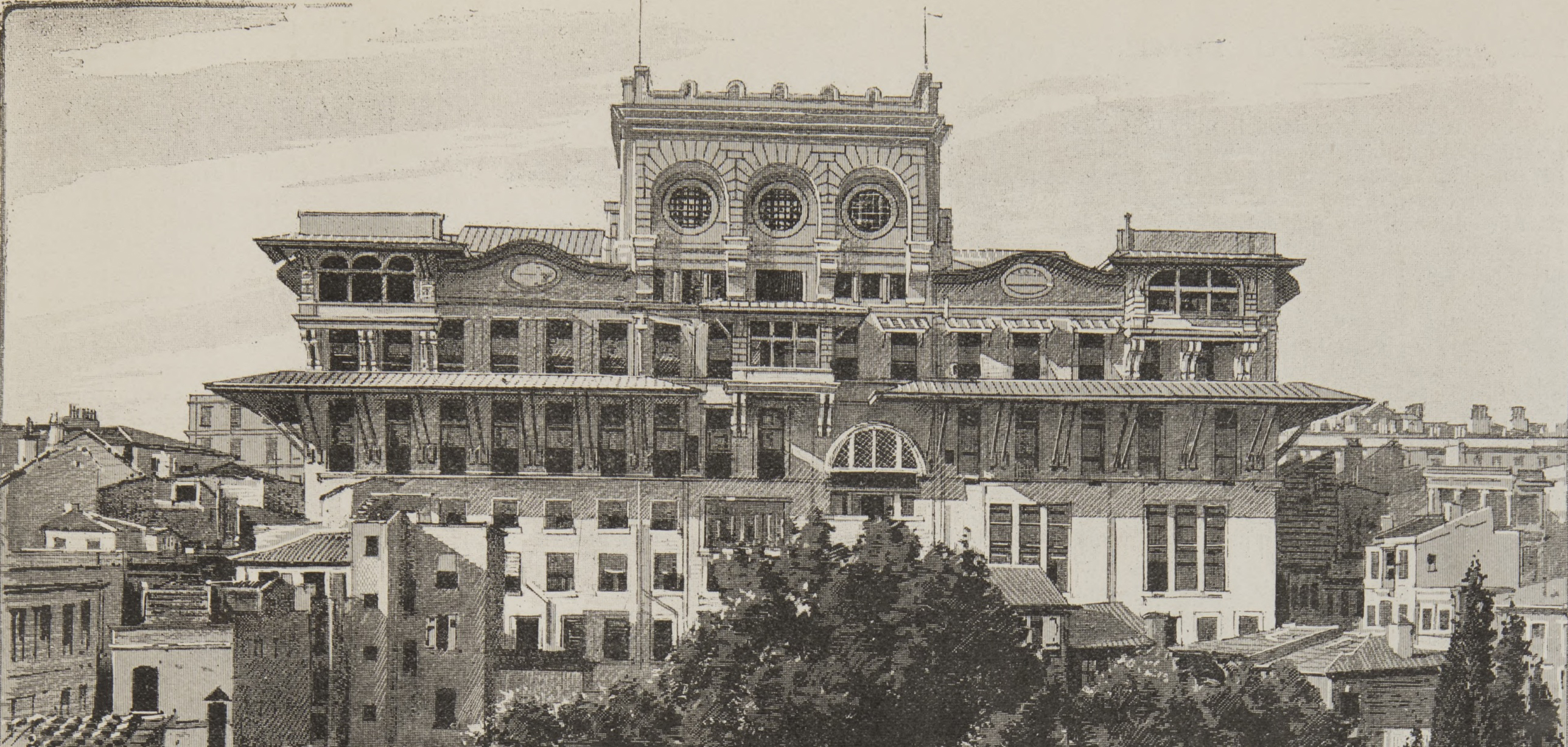
Yamada was a witness to the Young Turk Revolution in 1908 as well as the Occupation of the Ottoman Bank (picture of the Ottoman Bank shown above) in 1896 by Armenian militants, triggering a massacre of Armenians in Istanbul.

From 1895 to 1899, Yamada published numerous articles on Turkey in the Taiyō magazine. He also translated Turkish plays that occurred during the month of Ramadan as Dağlı Kız (The Daughter of the Mountain), a story about the beautiful daughter of a mountain bandit who saves people from kidnapping, and Kıskançlık (Jealousy), a romantic comedy. During this period, Yamada published articles such as The Real Circumstances of Turkey and Egypt in the Japanese trade magazine Nihon Shōgyō Zasshi, Women of Turkey in 1895, News of Turkey in 1896, and Conditions of Life in Turkey in 1899. None of his articles, however, related to culture. Yamada also reported news from the Occupation of the Ottoman Bank in 1896 by Armenian militants to the Taiyō magazine.

During the Russo-Japanese War, the Japanese government asked Yamada to secretly monitor the Bosporus for possible Russian naval movements. On July 4, 1904, he reported that three Russian warships passed the Dardanelles. At the time, the Turks began to take a great interest in Japan, a country that had modernized quickly to compete with major European powers. Due to the Russian threat to the North, the Turks were happy to learn of the Russian defeat.

== Return to Japan ==
Yamada returned to Japan in 1905 and established a Turkish-Japanese partnership in a cigarette paper factory in Osaka in the same year. He made his pilgrimage to Mecca on a return trip from Turkey in 1914. He became master of a tea school known as Yamada Soyu. He published the picture book Toruko Gakan (A Pictorial Reflection of Turkey; Japanese: 土耳古畫観) in 1911 in which he attempted to explain the city of Istanbul as well as Islam to his countrymen. In 1931, he returned to Turkey, meeting with President Mustafa Kemal Atatürk. He died in 1957, aged 90, after publishing his autobiography, entitled Shingetsu. The 16th-century samurai armor he offered to Sultan Abdülhamid II is currently on display in Topkapi Palace.

== See also ==
- Ertuğrul frigate
- Kushimoto Turkish Memorial and Museum
- 125 Years Memory
