= Kuroshima and Taijima =

Islands in Kushimoto, Wakayama, Japan

Coordinates: 33°30′14.7″N 135°49′30″E

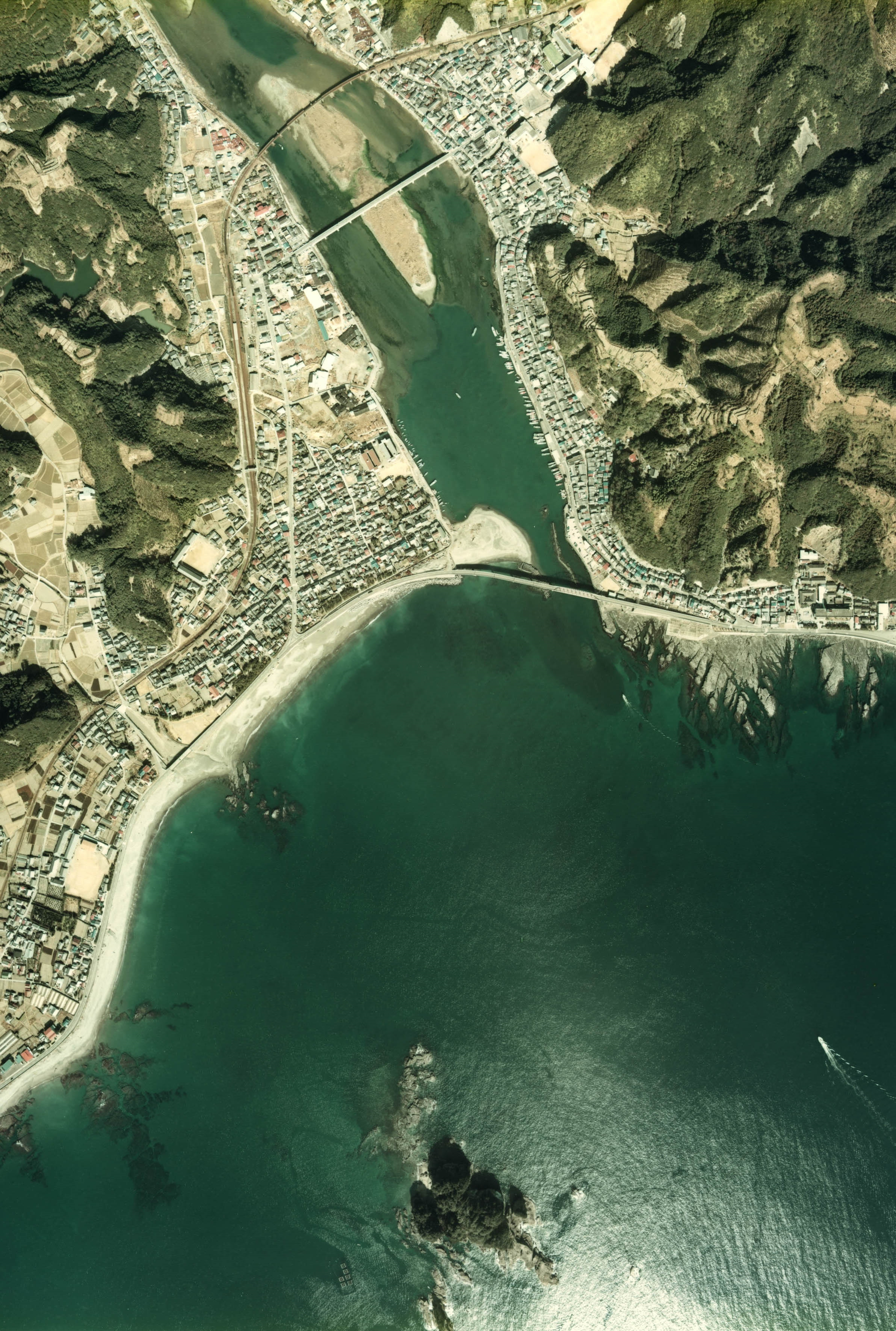
Aerial photograph of Kozagawa river estuary, showing Kuroshima

Kuroshima and Taijima (九龍島と鯛島, Kuroshima to Taijima) are a set of islands about one kilometer off the coast of Honshū in Japan by the mouth of the Koza River, a five-minute ride by ferry from Koza Port. The islands are part of Kushimoto, Wakayama Prefecture. The islands were used as a naval base of operations during the Genpei War.

Along with nearby Ryōshima, the islands are currently uninhabited and covered with dense sub-tropical vegetation. The islands can be seen from the coastal National Route 42.

While there are no permanent residents of the islands, Kuroshima and Taijima are popular locations for summer vacationers, especially during the Bon Festival in late summer when people go to the island to take part in seawater bathing. Canoeing and kayaking are also very popular.

Kuroshima and Taijima were used for location shooting for the TV Asahi television series Ikinari Ōgon Densetsu.

== See also ==
- Desert island
- List of islands
