= Kashinosaki Lighthouse =

Kashinosaki Lighthouse 樫野埼灯台
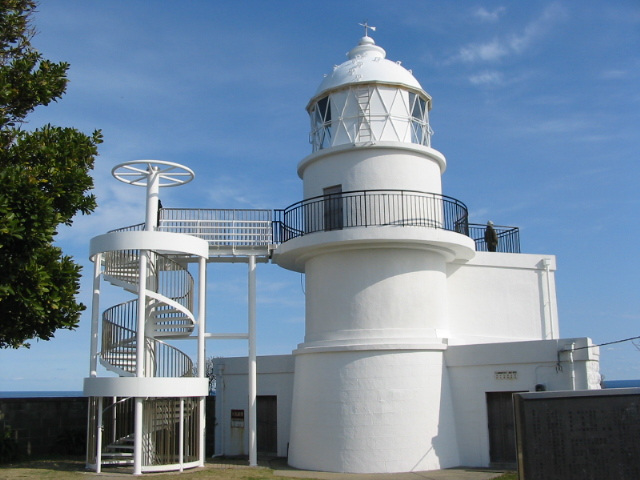
- Location: Cape Kashino, Kushimoto, Japan
- Coordinates: 33°28′17″N 135°51′43″E

Tower
- Constructed: 8 July 1870
- Construction: stone (tower), concrete (tower)
- Height: 14.6 m (48 ft)
- Shape: cylindrical tower with balcony and lantern
- Markings: White (tower), white (lantern)
- Heritage: Historic Site of Japan, JSCE Civil Engineering Heritage Site

Light
- First lit: 1954 (rebuilt)
- Focal height: 47 m (154 ft)
- Lens: second order Fresnel lens
- Intensity: 530,000 candela
- Range: 18.5 nmi (34.3 km; 21.3 mi)
- Characteristic: Gp Fl (2) 20s
- Japan no.: 2889
- National Historic Site of Japan

Kashinosaki Lighthouse (樫野埼灯台, Kashinosaki tōdai) is a lighthouse located on the island of Kii Ōshima, off the southwestern coast of Kii Peninsula in the Kansai region of Japan. Administratively, the island is part of the town of Kushimoto, Wakayama Prefecture.

== History ==
On June 25, 1866, the Tokugawa shogunate of Edo period Japan signed a customs and tax treaty with the United States, Great Britain, France, and the Netherlands to normalize trade relations. One of the stipulations of this treaty was that eight lighthouses be erected near the approaches to the treaty ports opened for foreign commerce.(Kannonzaki, Nojimasaki, Kashinosaki, Mikomotojima, Kusaki, Iojima, Cape Sata, and Shionomisaki). However, due to the Boshin War, work was not begun until after the Meiji restoration. The new Meiji government brought in foreign advisors to assist in the modernization efforts, one of whom was the British engineer Richard Henry Brunton who specialized in lighthouse design. Aside from the eight lighthouses stipulated by the treaty (i.e. the "treaty lighthouses"), Brunton went on to constructed another 25 lighthouses from far northern Hokkaidō to southern Kyūshū during his career in Japan.

Work on the Kashinosaki Lighthouse began in April 1869, and it was first lit on July 8, 1870, making it the first stone lighthouse in Japan. However, despite this lighthouse being operational, on the night of September 16, 1890, the Ottoman Navy frigate Ertuğrul sank in a typhoon east of Kashinosaki. Ten of the survivors climbed the cliff below the lighthouse to safety.

The lighthouse was reconstructed in 1954. On April 12, 2002, the lighthouse as opened to the public, with an observation deck constructed at a height of 6.5 meters, accessible by a spiral staircase. The lighthouse's optical system was certified as a Mechanical Engineering Heritage site in July 2016, and the lighthouse structure itself as a Civil Engineering Heritage site in 2017. It was designated a National Historic Site in 2021.

The lighthouse is within the borders of the Yoshino-Kumano National Park. The lighthouse is now operated by the Japan Coast Guard 5th Regional Headquarters

== Gallery ==
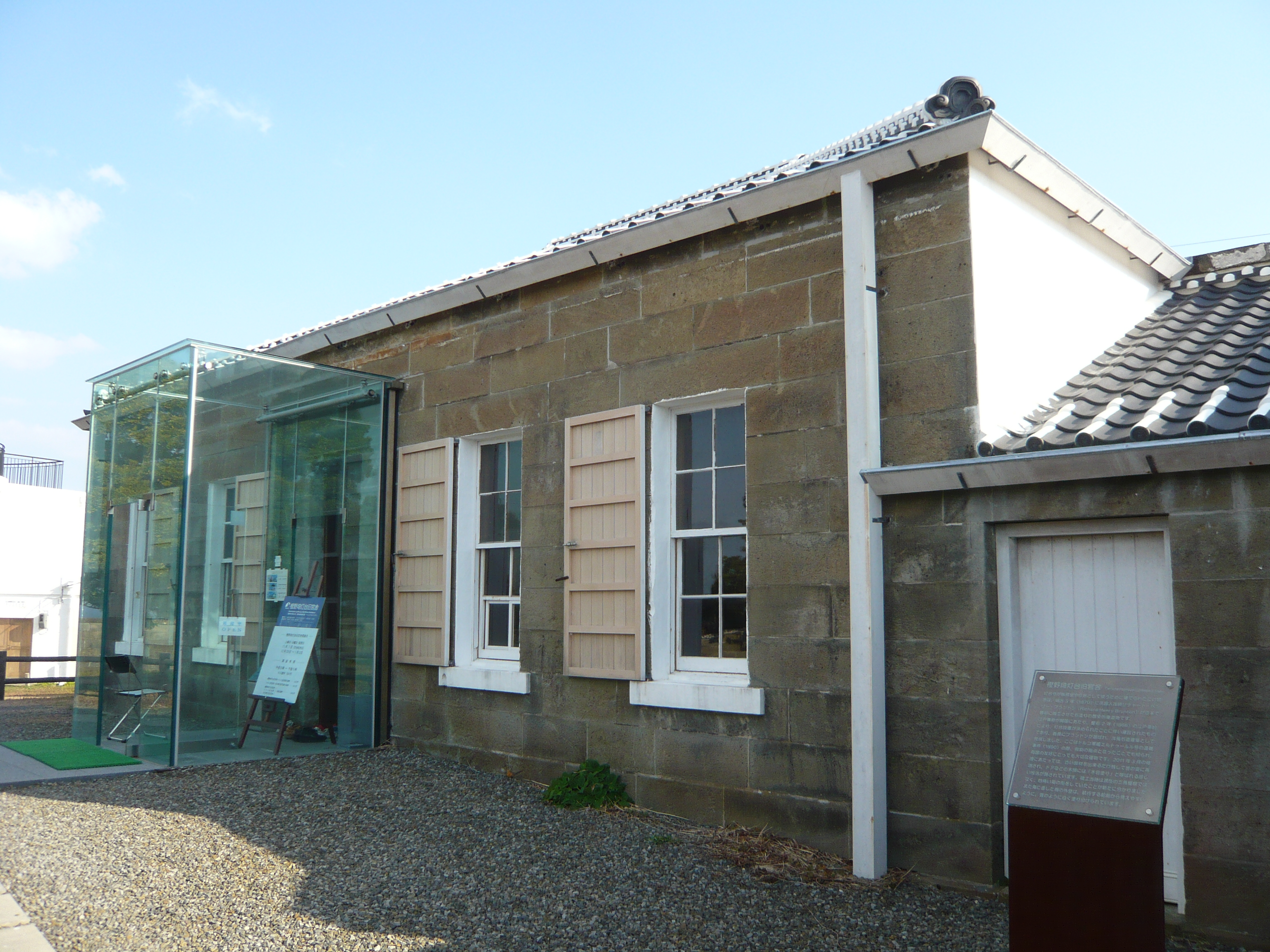
Lightkeepers house

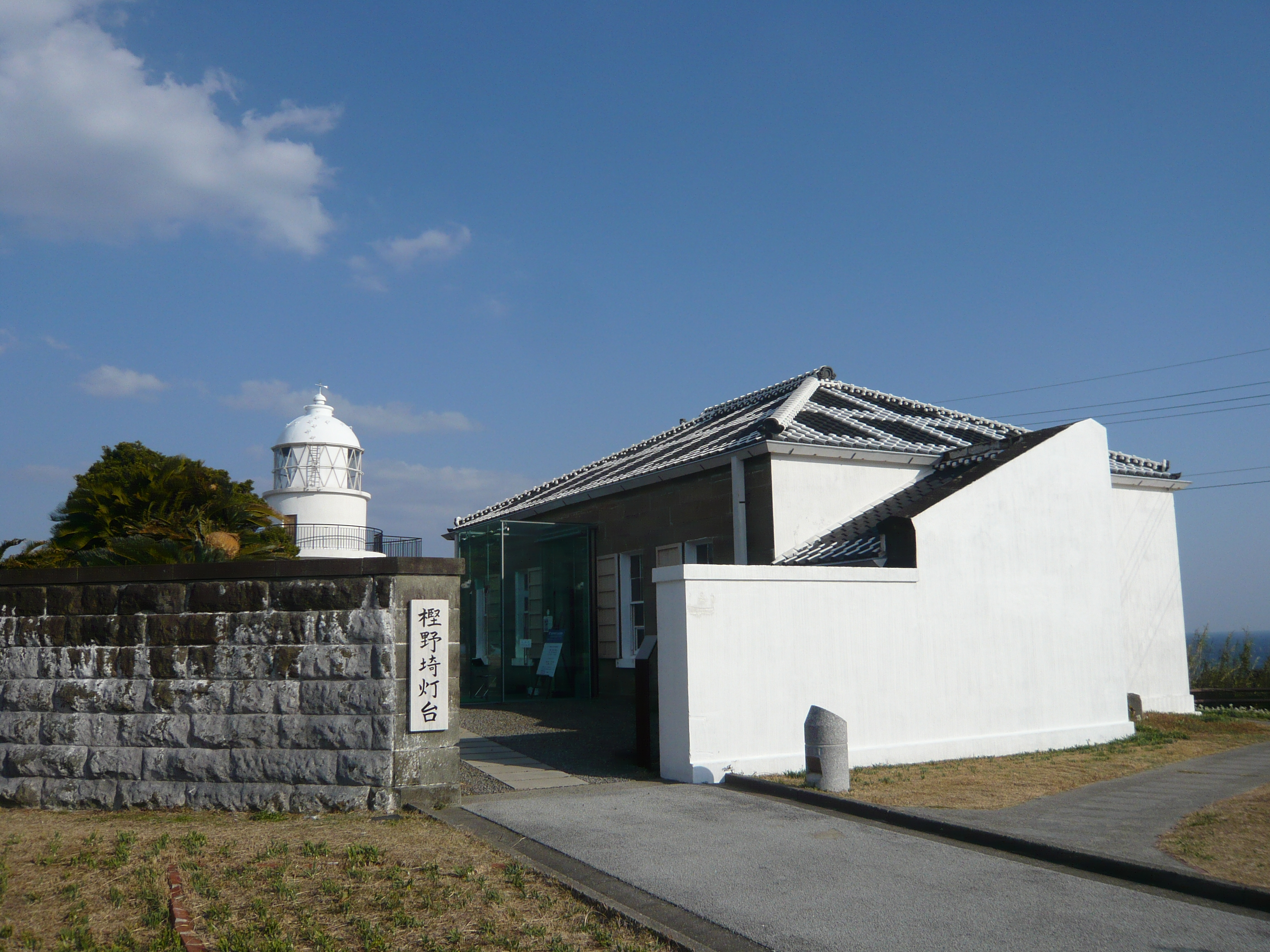
Panoramic view

== See also ==
- Kushimoto Turkish Memorial and Museum
- List of Historic Sites of Japan (Wakayama)
- List of lighthouses in Japan
- 125 Years Memory
