= Kushimoto Turkish Memorial and Museum =

Monument in Kushimoto, Wakayama, Japan

- トルコ軍艦遭難記念碑
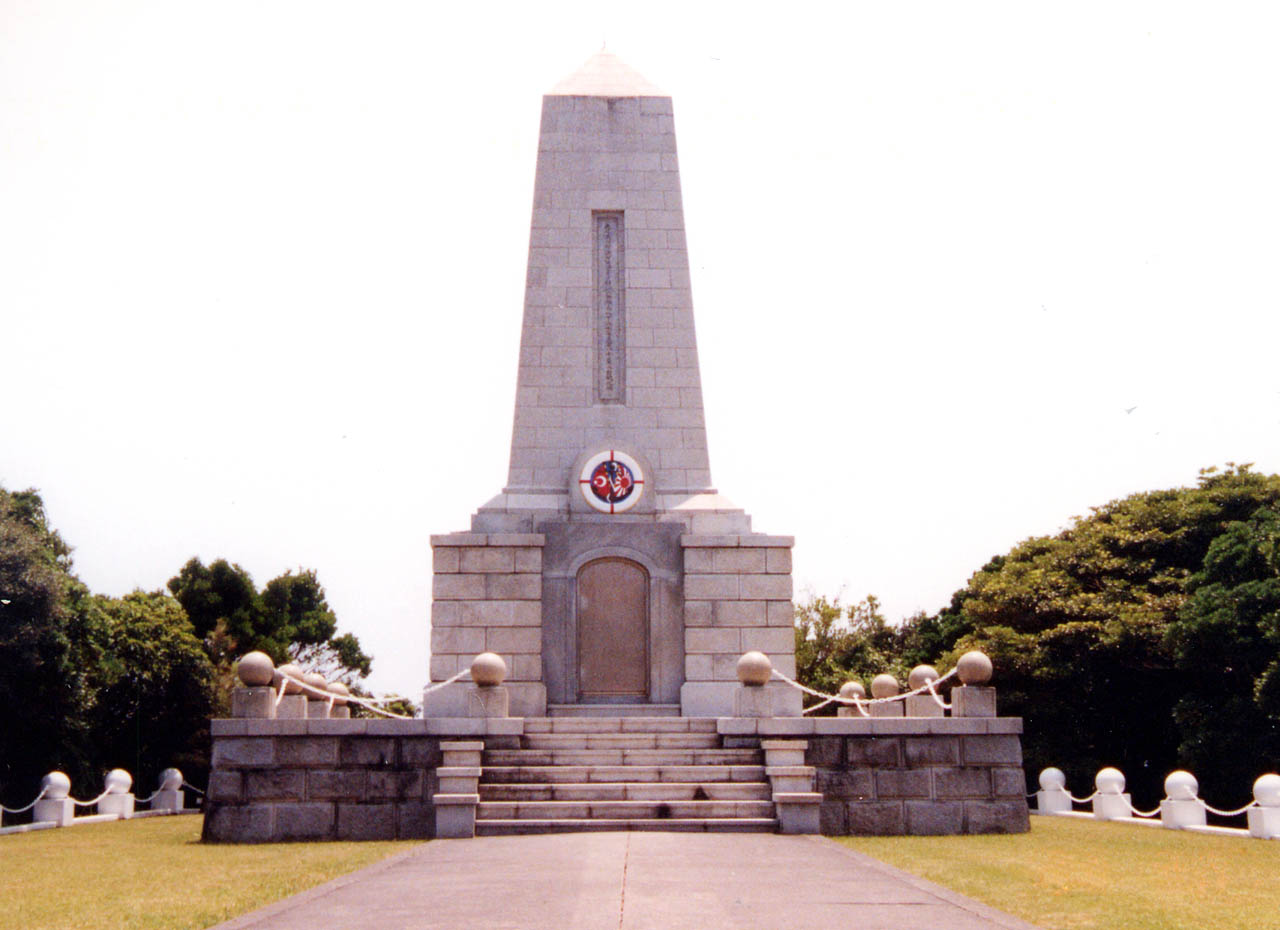
- Monument at the Kushimoto Turkish Memorial and Museum, Japan
- Interactive map of Kushimoto Turkish Memorial and Museum
- Location: Kii Ōshima, Kushimoto, Wakayama
- Coordinates: 33°28′9.26″N 135°51′30.82″E
- Opening date: 1929
- Dedicated to: the sailors of the Ottoman frigate Ertuğrul, which sunk off Kii Ōshima in 1890

The Kushimoto Turkish Memorial and Museum (Japanese: トルコ軍艦遭難記念碑), aka Frigate Ertuğrul Memorial and Museum (Turkish: Ertuğrul Anıtı ve Müzesi), is a monument and a museum to commemorate the sailors of the Ottoman frigate Ertuğrul, which sunk in 1890 off Kushimoto, Wakayama, in Japan.

== Background ==
Ertuğrul was an 1863-built sailing frigate of the Ottoman Navy. She left Istanbul on July 14, 1889, with around 600 sailors and officers on board for an official visit to Japan. She completed her visit on September 16, 1890, after a three-month stay, and set sail from Yokohama for return. Around midnight on September 16, the vessel hit reefs and fell apart in stormy weather. She sank off Kii Ōshima while only six officers and 63 sailors survived, most of them with injuries. The survivors were transported home aboard two Japanese corvettes in October 1890, who were received by the sultan Abdul Hamid II in January 1891.

== Cemetery and monument ==
In February 1891, 150 bodies recovered from the wreckage were buried in a newly established cemetery. On September 15, 1891, the first anniversary of the disaster, a monument was erected 400 m (1,300 ft) far from the site of the accident, near the Kashinosaki Lighthouse of Kushimoto.

A second memorial stone was erected by the Japanese-Turkish Trade Association on April 5, 1929, and visited by Emperor Hirohito on June 3 the same year. After this information reached Turkey, its government proposed a new monument. The construction started on October 22, 1936, and the opening ceremony took place on June 3, 1937, with attendance by the Turkish ambassador.

== Museum ==
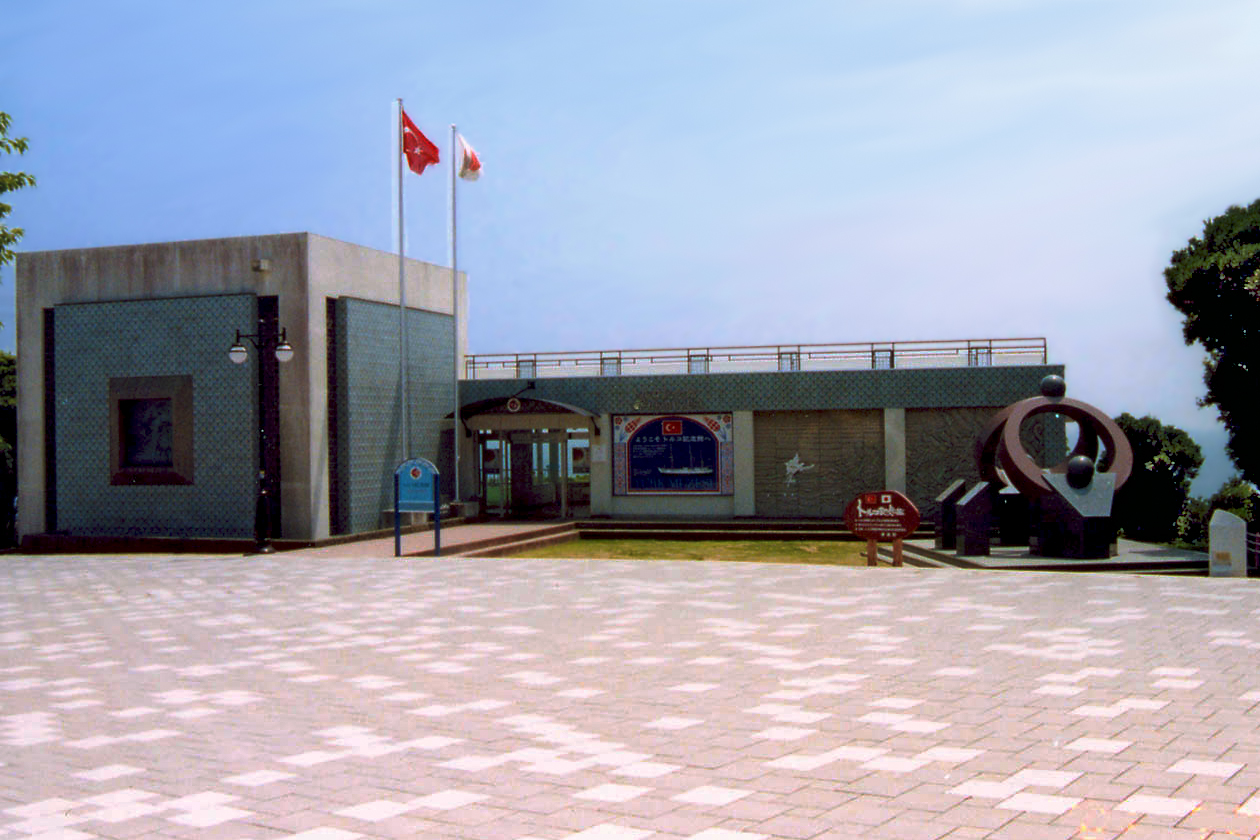
Museum building at the Kushimoto Turkish Memorial and Museum

A museum was established near the memorial in cooperation with the Kushimoto Municipality and the Turkish Embassy in Japan. It was opened on December 14, 1974.

In the museum, objects initially recovered from the wreckage by the fishermen, belongings and photographs of the ship's officers and the seamen as well as a ship model of the frigate are on display. Later, a corner was added to the museum devoted to Mustafa Kemal Atatürk, the founder of the Turkish Republic. Also items sent from Kushimoto's twin cities in Turkey, Mersin and Yakakent, are exhibited in the museum.

== Visitor attraction ==
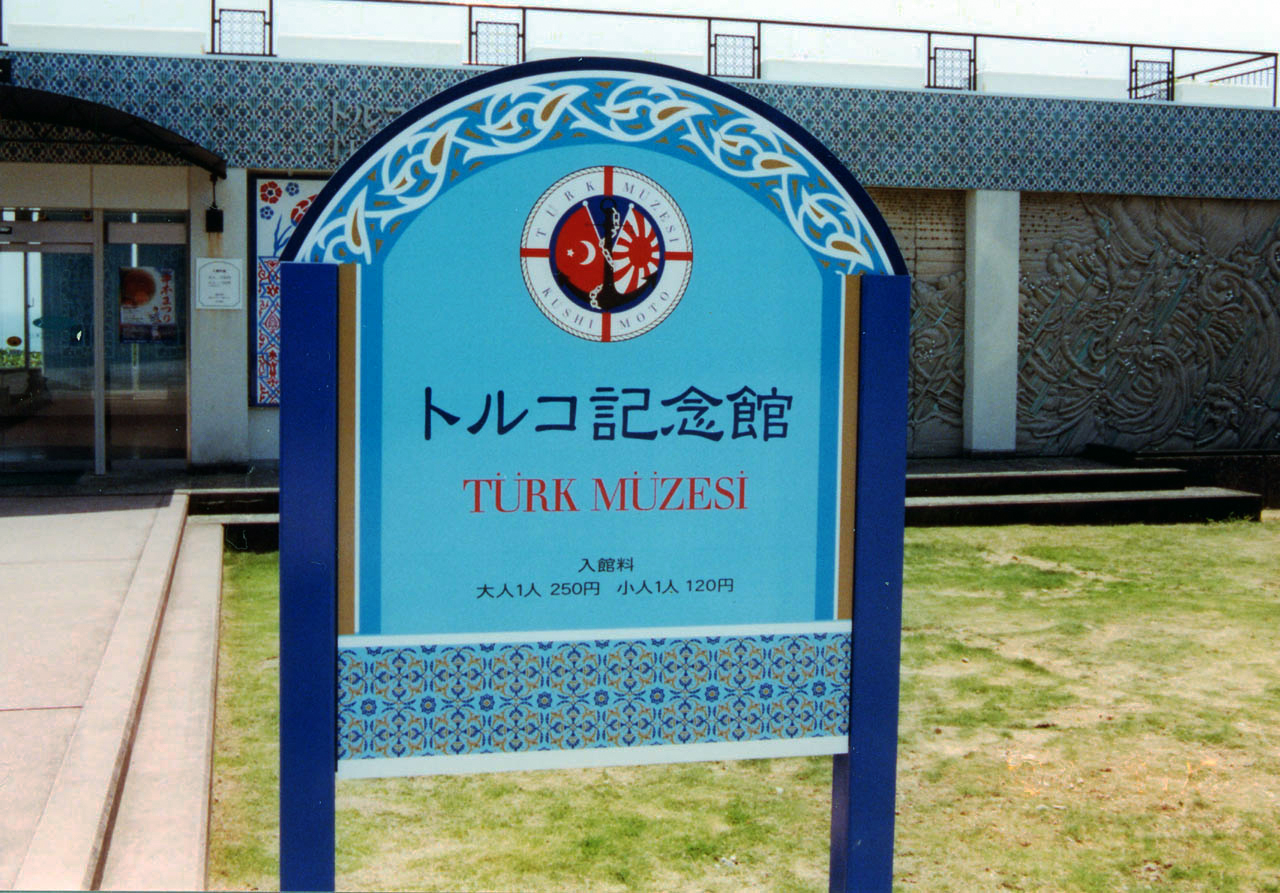
Inscription of the museum

The Turkish memorial and museum are a visitor attraction in Wakayama region. The venue ranks first in the must-see list of the local municipality. It is also the third most-visited place.

Admission to the monument is free. The museum is open from 9:00 to 17:00 hours local time.

Turkish high officials pay tribute at the monument and the memorial cemetery during their visit to Japan.

== Monument in Turkey ==
The "Association of Turkish-Japanese Friendship and Frigate Ertuğrul Martyrs' in Ünye" erected a monument in Topyanı neighborhood of Ünye, a town at the Black Sea province of Ordu, northern Turkey in commemoration of native sailors, who were on board the sunken ship. The opening ceremony was held on September 14, 2014, the 124th anniversary of the disaster, in presence of the Ambassador of Japan to Turkey, Turkish high-ranked local officials and the crew of the Turkish frigate TCG Oruçreis (F-245) representing the Turkish Navy.

== See also ==
- Ottoman frigate Ertuğrul
- 125 Years Memory, Drama film commemorating the 125th anniversary of the Ertuğrul incident
- Torajiro Yamada
