= Kii Ōshima =

Island in Wakayama, Japan

Native name: 紀伊大島
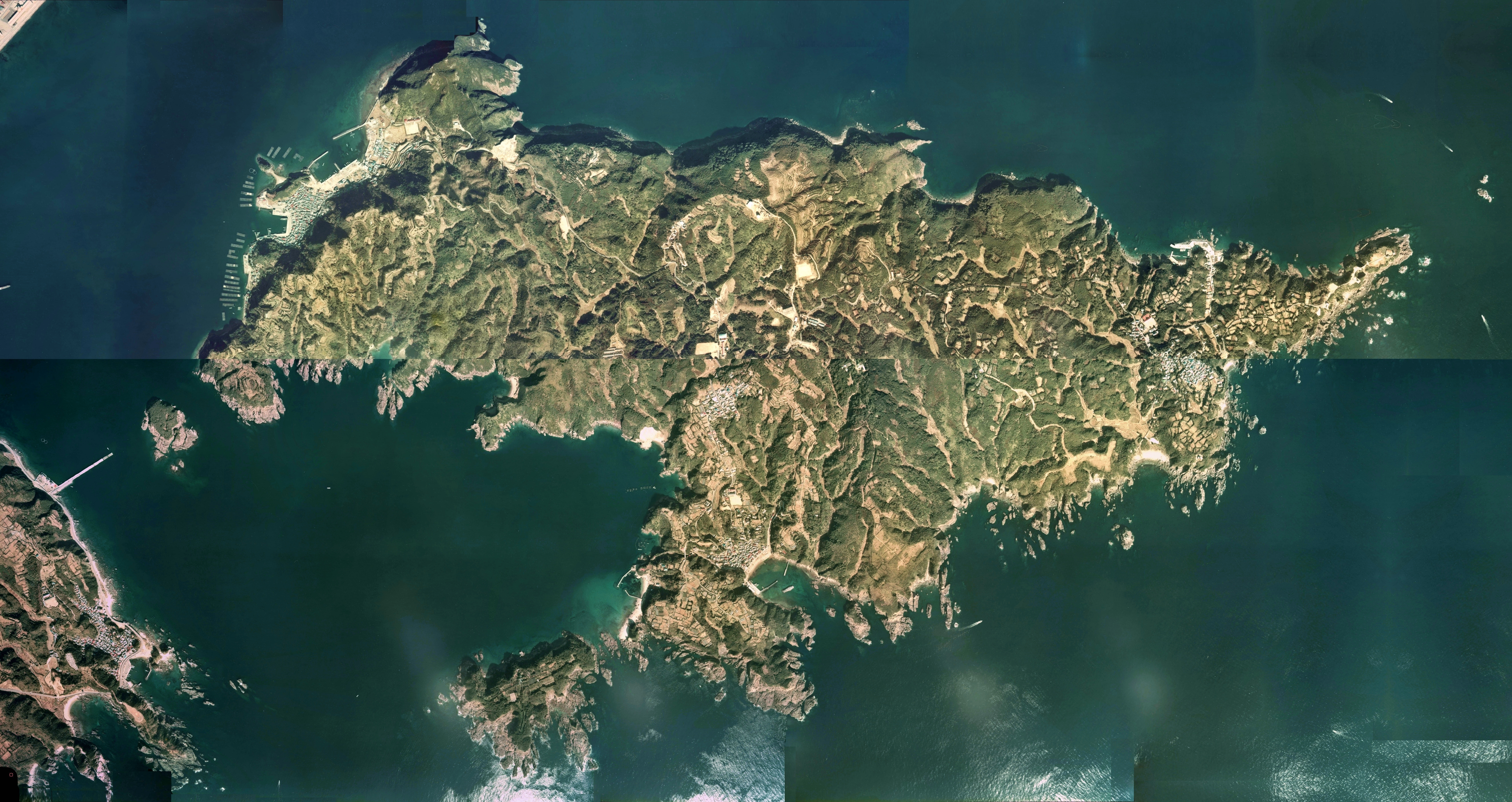

- Kii Ōshima Kii Ōshima (Japan)

Geography
- Location: Kushimoto, Wakayama
- Coordinates: 33°28′05″N 135°49′41″E
- Area: 9.68 km^{2} (3.74 sq mi)
- Length: 2.5 km (1.55 mi)
- Width: 8 km (5 mi)
- Coastline: 26 km (16.2 mi)
- Highest point: Omoriyama

Administration
- Japan

Demographics
- Population: ~2,000

Kii Ōshima (紀伊大島) is an inhabited island lying off the southern tip of the Kii Peninsula and the southernmost point of Honshū, Japan. It has an estimated population of around 2000, and is administratively part of the town of Kushimoto in Wakayama Prefecture. The island is approximately 8 kilometres (5.0 mi) in length from east-to-west by 2.5 kilometres (1.6 mi) north-to-south.

== Geography ==
Kii Ōshima is located approximately one kilometer to the east of Cape Shionomisaki and the island of Myogajima, and 1.8 kilometers from mainland Honshu. It has an intricate ria coastline are is noted for sea cliffs on all sides except for its western end. Cape Kashinozaki extends from the eastern end of the island, and is surrounded by semi-submerged reefs and rocks. The island has a circumference of 28 kilometres (17 mi) and an area of 9.68 square kilometres (3.74 mi^{2})

The Kuroshio Current surrounds the island, forming a fertile fishing ground, and approximately 60% of the interior of the island is cultivated. There are several hamlets, located in the south of the island.

The island is connected to mainland Honshū by a series of three arch bridges. The road over the bridges opened to through traffic on September 8, 1999.

== History ==
Fishermen from Taiji and Kushimoto have been using Kii Ōshima as a base for a long time. Ōshima Port, which is the center of the island, has prospered from the Edo period as both a fishing port as well as shelter for boats seeking protection from inclement weather on the coastal trading route between Osaka and the eastern provinces of Japan. Whaling has also been practiced for a long time, and Nippon Suisan Kaisha's whaling base was located at Ōshima Port.

The Japan-U.S. Friendship Memorial Hall on the island commemorates the visit of the trade vessels Lady Washington, under Captain John Kendrick, and Grace, under William Douglas, in 1791. These ships and their crews were the first American ships to visit Japan, but were turned away by officials of the Tokugawa shogunate under Japan's national seclusion policy at the time.

The Kushimoto Turkish Memorial and Museum commemorates the victims of the Ottoman frigate Ertuğrul, which sank in a typhoon off of the island in 1890 with great loss of life.

The village of Ōshima was established on April 1, 1889, with the creation of the modern municipalities system. It was annexed by the town of Kushimoto on January 15, 1958.

== Gallery ==
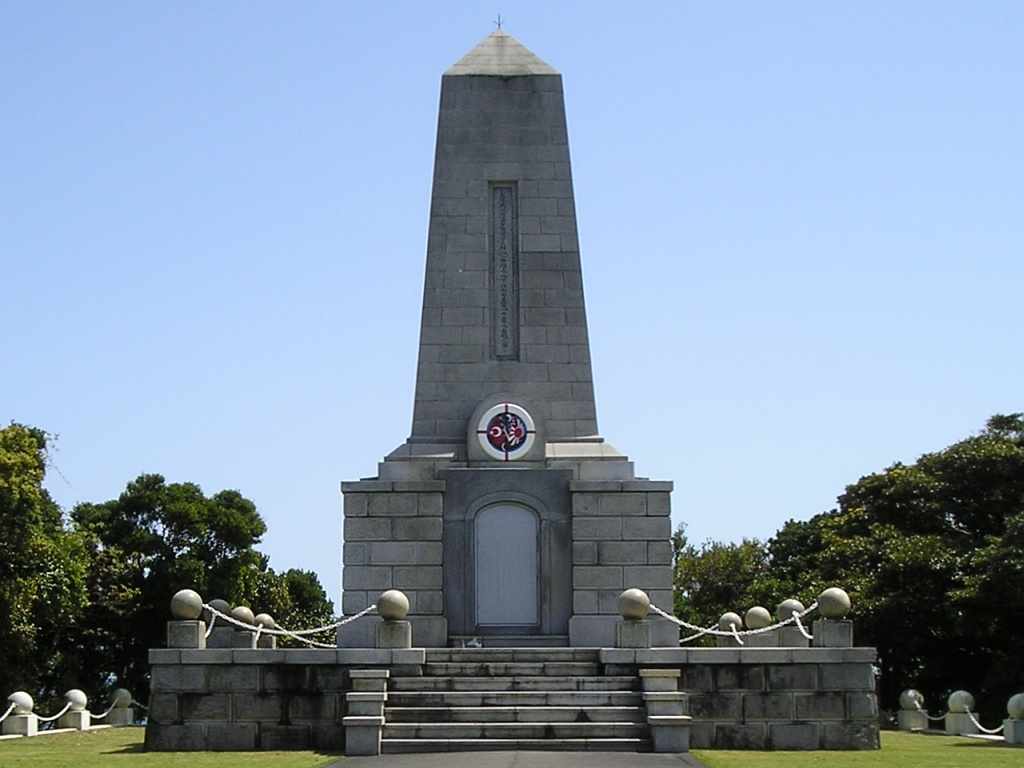
Ertuğru Memorial

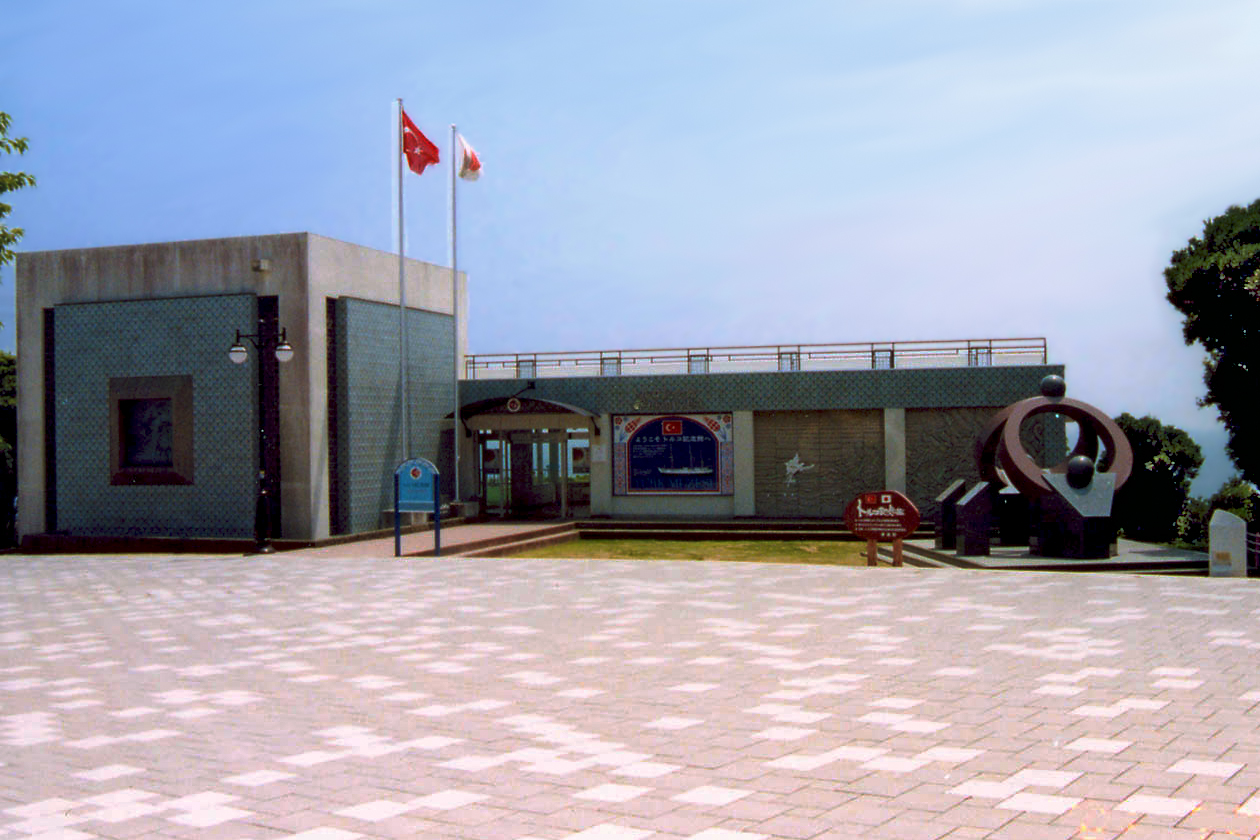
Turkish Museum

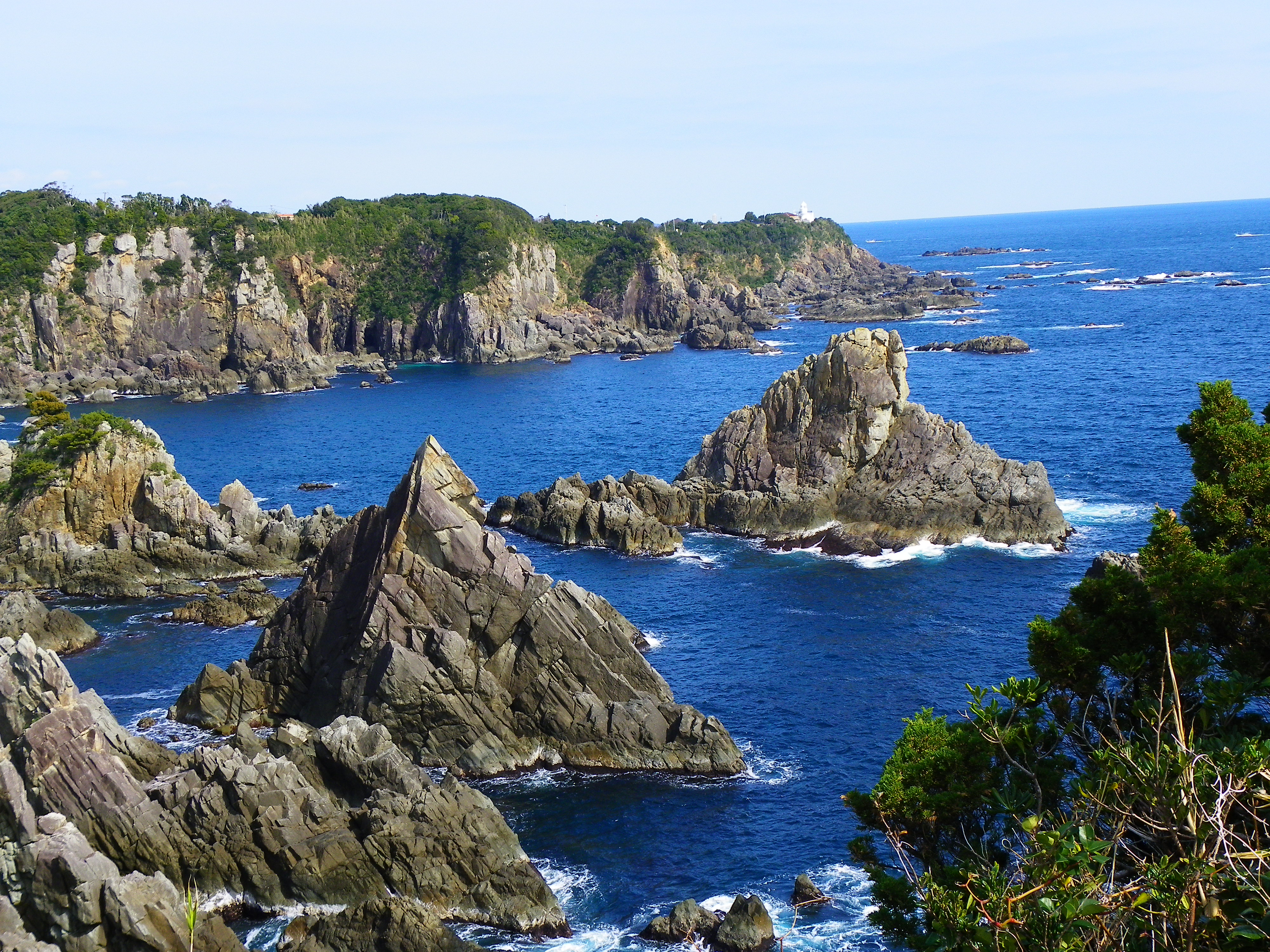
coast of Kii-Ōshima

== See also ==
- Ōshima
- Kashinosaki Lighthouse
- 125 Years Memory
