= Ōshima Subprefecture =

Ōshima Subprefecture (大島支庁, Ōshima-shichō) may refer to:

- Ōshima Subprefecture (Tokyo) of Tokyo
- Ōshima Subprefecture (Kagoshima) of Kagoshima Prefecture

== See also ==
- Oshima Subprefecture of Hokkaidō
