= Ōshima (surname) =

Ōshima, Oshima, Ooshima or Ohshima (written: 大島, 大嶋 lit. "big island") is a Japanese surname. Notable people with the surname include:

- Hiroko Oshima (大島 裕子; born 1943), Japanese sprint canoeist
- Hiromi Oshima, model and playmate
- Hiroshi Ōshima, Japanese ambassador to Nazi Germany during World War II
- Joun Ōshima, noted Japanese sculptor in the Meiji/Taisho era
- Kengo Oshima, Japanese para athlete
- Mai Oshima, Japanese idol, member of AKB48
- Masamitsu Ōshima (1884–1965), Japanese herpetologist and ichthyologist
- Masumi Oshima, Japanese writer
- Michiru Oshima, Japanese composer
- Nagisa Oshima, Japanese film director
- Naoto Ohshima, original character designer of Sonic the Hedgehog and Dr. Robotnik
- Ryota Oshima (大島 僚太; born 1993), Japanese footballer
- Takanori Ōshima, Japanese sumo coach at Tomozuna stable
- Takatō Ōshima, made the first blast furnace and western-style cannons in Japan
- Towa Oshima, manga artist
- Tsubasa Oshima (大島 翼; born 1983), Japanese footballer
- Tsutomu Ohshima, martial artist, head of Shotokan Karate of America
- Yasunori Oshima, Japanese baseball player and manager
- Yuko Oshima, Japanese idol, member of AKB48

== Fictional characters ==
- Ōshima (Urara Meirocho) (大島), a character in the manga series Urara Meirocho
