= Kushimoto =

Kushimoto 串本町
- Town
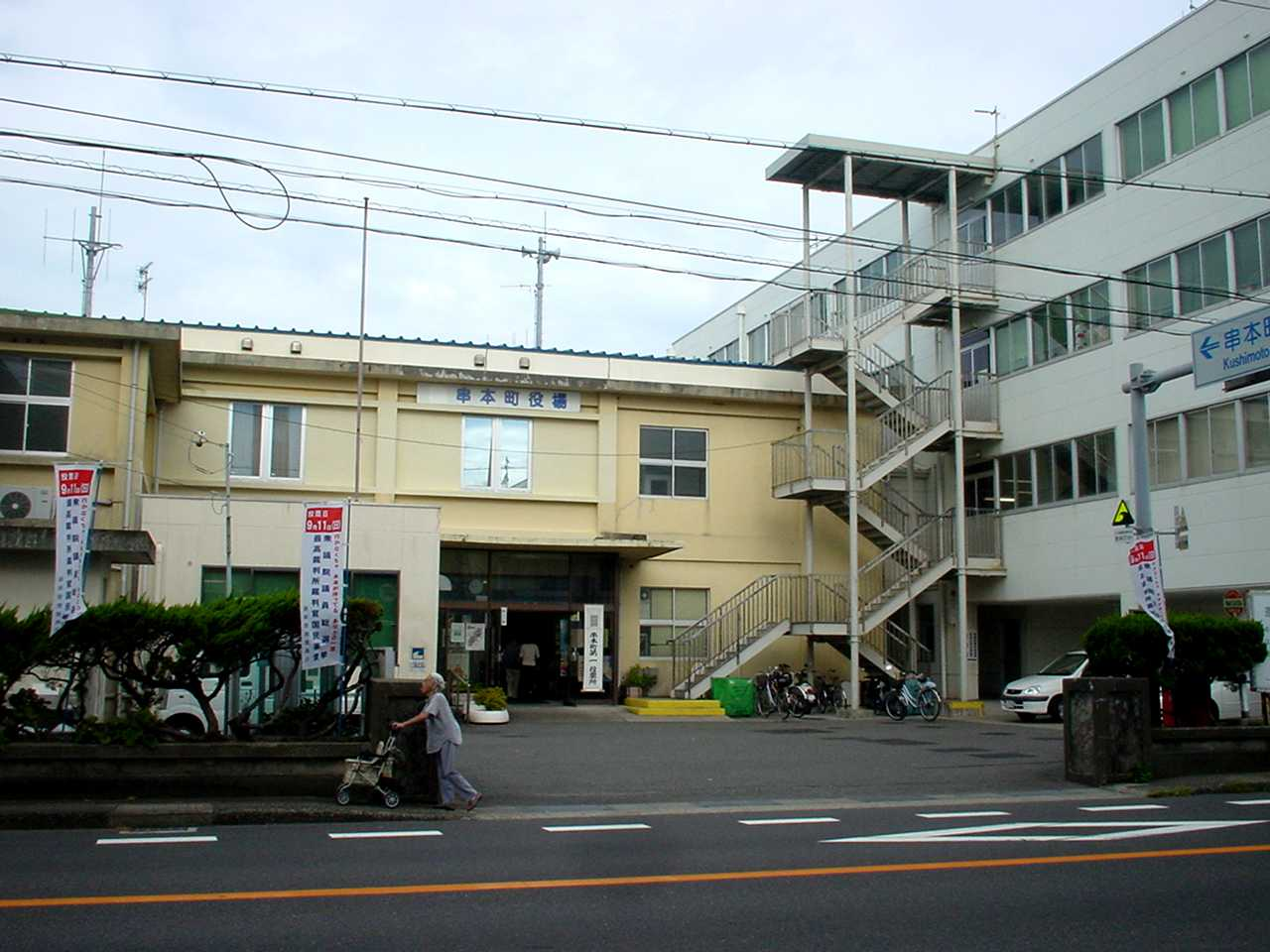
- Kushimoto Town Hall

- Flag Emblem

- Location in Japan
- Coordinates: 33°28′N 135°47′E
- Country: Japan
- Region: Kansai
- Prefecture: Wakayama
- District: Higashimuro

Government
  - Mayor: Katsumasa Tashima

Area
  - Total: 135.67 km^{2} (52.38 sq mi)

Population (November 30, 2021)
  - Total: 15,192
  - Density: 111.98/km^{2} (290.02/sq mi)
- Time zone: UTC+09:00 (JST)
- Climate: Cfa
- Website: Official website
- Symbols
- Flower: Mochinoki (Birdlime Holly)
- Tree: Tsubaki (Japanese Camellia)

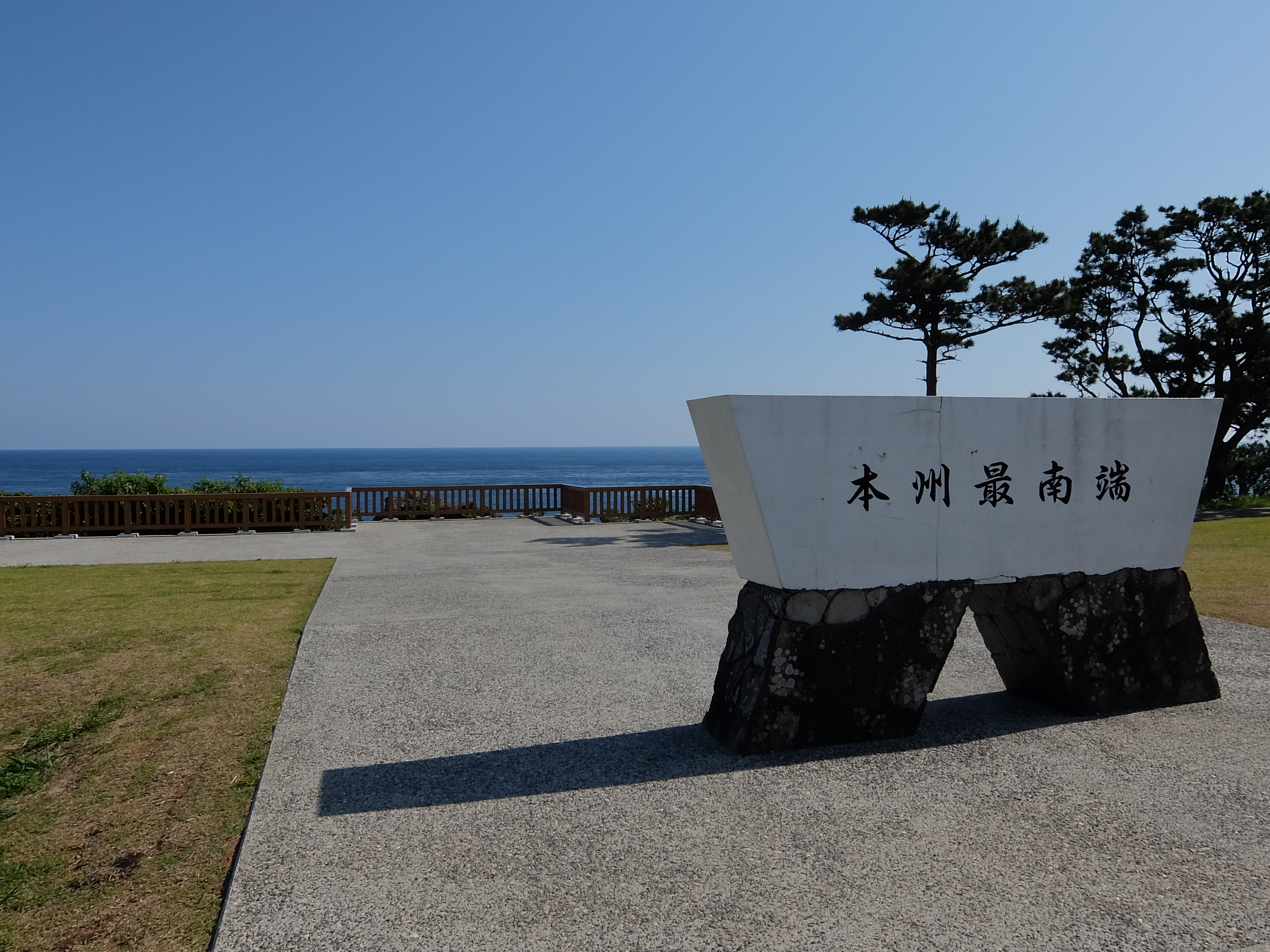
Shionomisaki Southernmost Point Park

Kushimoto (串本町, Kushimoto-chō; Japanese pronunciation: [kɯ̥.ɕiꜜ.mo.to, -ɕi.mo.toꜜ.tɕoː]) is a coastal town located in Higashimuro District, Wakayama Prefecture, Japan. As of 30 November 2021, the town had an estimated population of 15,192 in 8354 households and a population density of 110 persons per km^{2}. The total area of the town is 135.67 square kilometres (52.38 sq mi).

== Geography ==
Kushimoto has the distinction of being the southernmost point of Japan's main island, Honshū. It is located at the southernmost tip of Kii Peninsula, with the urban area on the isthmus connecting Cape Shionomisaki with the mainland. The island of Kii Oshima is located on the east side of the city, and is connected by the Kushimoto Ohashi Bridge, which was completed in September 1999. Parts of the coastal area of the town are within the limits of the Yoshino-Kumano National Park and include the Hashiguiiwa Rocks, which are a National Natural Monument.

=== Neighboring municipalities ===
Wakayama Prefecture

- Kozagawa, to the north
- Nachikatsuura, to the east
- Susami, to the west

=== Climate ===
Kushimoto has a humid subtropical climate (Köppen Cfa) characterized by warm summers and cool winters with light to no snowfall. The average annual temperature in Kushimoto is 17.5 °C. The average annual rainfall is 2515 mm with September as the wettest month. The temperatures are highest on average in August, at around 26.9 °C, and lowest in January, at around 8.1 °C. Kushimoto has a very wet climate. The area is subject to typhoons and the moist winds of the Kuroshio Current in summer. Kushimoto is famous as the "Typhoon Ginza" (after Ginza in Tokyo). The wettest month was September 1929 with 846.5 millimetres (33.3 in) whilst in January 2010 the town received no rain for the second time since records began in 1913 and had the lowest monthly humidity on record at 47 percent. The heaviest daily rainfall was 420.7 millimetres (16.6 in) on 17 October 1939.

Climate data for Cape Shionomisaki, Kushimoto (elevation 68 m (223 ft), 1991−2020 normals, extremes 1913−present)
Month	Jan	Feb	Mar	Apr	May	Jun	Jul	Aug	Sep	Oct	Nov	Dec	Year
Record high °C (°F)	23.6 (74.5)	23.4 (74.1)	23.9 (75.0)	26.2 (79.2)	29.4 (84.9)	30.8 (87.4)	35.6 (96.1)	36.1 (97.0)	33.8 (92.8)	30.0 (86.0)	27.2 (81.0)	23.3 (73.9)	36.1 (97.0)
Mean maximum °C (°F)	17.6 (63.7)	18.9 (66.0)	20.7 (69.3)	23.4 (74.1)	26.5 (79.7)	28.4 (83.1)	31.8 (89.2)	32.3 (90.1)	30.8 (87.4)	27.6 (81.7)	23.6 (74.5)	20.3 (68.5)	32.8 (91.0)
Mean daily maximum °C (°F)	11.4 (52.5)	12.4 (54.3)	15.2 (59.4)	18.8 (65.8)	22.5 (72.5)	24.7 (76.5)	28.2 (82.8)	29.8 (85.6)	27.6 (81.7)	23.2 (73.8)	18.7 (65.7)	13.8 (56.8)	20.5 (68.9)
Daily mean °C (°F)	8.3 (46.9)	8.8 (47.8)	11.6 (52.9)	15.6 (60.1)	19.3 (66.7)	22.1 (71.8)	25.7 (78.3)	26.9 (80.4)	24.6 (76.3)	20.3 (68.5)	15.5 (59.9)	10.6 (51.1)	17.5 (63.5)
Mean daily minimum °C (°F)	5.2 (41.4)	5.3 (41.5)	8.2 (46.8)	12.3 (54.1)	16.6 (61.9)	19.9 (67.8)	23.8 (74.8)	24.8 (76.6)	22.1 (71.8)	17.7 (63.9)	12.4 (54.3)	7.5 (45.5)	14.6 (58.3)
Mean minimum °C (°F)	0.5 (32.9)	0.7 (33.3)	2.4 (36.3)	6.2 (43.2)	12.3 (54.1)	16.3 (61.3)	20.5 (68.9)	21.9 (71.4)	18.0 (64.4)	12.6 (54.7)	7.0 (44.6)	2.7 (36.9)	−0.1 (31.8)
Record low °C (°F)	−3.6 (25.5)	−5.0 (23.0)	−2.2 (28.0)	1.5 (34.7)	7.3 (45.1)	12.5 (54.5)	15.3 (59.5)	18.1 (64.6)	14.2 (57.6)	7.7 (45.9)	2.5 (36.5)	−2.0 (28.4)	−5.0 (23.0)
Average precipitation mm (inches)	97.7 (3.85)	118.1 (4.65)	185.5 (7.30)	212.3 (8.36)	236.7 (9.32)	364.7 (14.36)	298.4 (11.75)	260.3 (10.25)	339.2 (13.35)	286.6 (11.28)	152.0 (5.98)	102.9 (4.05)	2,654.3 (104.50)
Average precipitation days (≥ 0.5 mm)	7.1	8.3	11.8	11.4	11.9	15.8	12.9	12.4	13.2	12.0	9.3	7.0	133.1
Average relative humidity (%)	58	58	62	68	75	84	86	84	78	72	64	60	71
Mean monthly sunshine hours	192.5	187.9	198.6	201.9	193.2	132.4	193.2	234.8	176.8	169.8	177.5	194.0	2,255.9
Source: Japan Meteorological Agency

== Demographics ==
Per Japanese census data, the population of Kushimoto has decreased steadily over the past 60 years.

Historical population
Year	Pop.	±%
1920	26,785	—
1930	28,441	+6.2%
1940	27,880	−2.0%
1950	34,979	+25.5%
1960	31,652	−9.5%
1970	27,141	−14.3%
1980	26,256	−3.3%
1990	23,937	−8.8%
2000	21,429	−10.5%
2010	18,257	−14.8%

On April 1, 2005, Kushimoto absorbed the town of Koza, from Higashimuro District, to become the new town of Kushimoto.

== History ==
The area of the modern city of Shingū was within ancient Kii Province. During the Edo period it was part of the holdings of Kishū Domain, under a cadet branch of the Tokugawa clan, headquartered at Wakayama Castle.

In 1791 the US captains John Kendrick of the Lady Washington and William Douglas of the Grace visited Kushimoto, hoping to open a trading relationship with Japan. However, they did not receive a warm reception. News was sent to Wakayama Castle, which sent troops. However, Kendrick and Douglas had departed two days before the troops arrived. The result of this first visit of Americans to Japan was largely symbolic for the United States. For Japan it resulted in a new system of alarms and coastal patrols, increasing Japan's isolation under sakoku.

Kushimoto village was established on April 1, 1889, within Nishimuro District, Wakayama with the creation of the modern municipalities system. On September 16, 1890, the Ertuğrul incident occurred, in which an Imperial Ottoman Navy frigate on a goodwill visit to Japan floundered in a typhoon off of Kushimoto with great loss of life.

Kushimoto was elevated to town status on November 12, 1907. Over the next decades, the town grew as a result of numerous mergers with the surrounding village, annexing Fujihashi in 1924, Arita, Shiono-Misaki, Tanami, and Wabuka in 1955 and Oshima in 1958. On April 1, 2005, Kushimoto merged with the town of Koza, from Higashimuro District. Due to its strong ties with the city of Shingū both for political and economic reasons, Kushimoto became part of Higashimuro District upon this merger.

Being in a strategic location, Kushimoto was home to many military installations during World War II, including the Kushimoto Seaplane Base and Shionomisaki Airfield. Both bases were attacked by the United States Navy and Air Force in 1945, including a naval bombardment on the night of 24/25 July. Shionomisaki Airfield now serves as a small base for the Japanese Air Self-Defense Force.

Kushimoto (or specifically, Cape Shionomisaki) was the epicenter of the Great Nankai earthquake, a magnitude 8.0 earthquake that struck the area on December 21, 1946, at 4:19am. This triggered a tsunami that enveloped the central part of town. Most of the Fujihashi neighborhood was destroyed but has since been rebuilt. There are memorials around town marking the event, including signposts indicating how far the tsunami had penetrated inland. Of the 269 casualties in Wakayama Prefecture, the majority were in Kushimoto and in the city of Kainan.

On September 26, 1959, a typhoon hit Kushimoto directly, causing a large scale storm and storm surge damage mainly in the Tokai region (especially Nagoya). This typhoon, called the Isewan Typhoon, killed 5,000 people and was the deadliest typhoon in modern Japan.

=== Name origin ===
There are two widely accepted views of the origin of the name "Kushimoto" frm. The first is explained by a strange tree growing in a shrine in Cape Shionomisaki, whose seedling is thought to have floated from a far off island to its current resting place. An archaic compound form of the Chinese character for "kushi" (串) is said to have meant "strange tree"; in combination with the second character "moto" (本), the name is supposed to represent "strange tree's origin." Another explanation dictates that the "kushi" character is a visual abstraction of the town's layout; Cape Shionomisaki and Oshima act as the smaller upper "kuchi" (口) radical, while the mainland acts as the larger lower one. The "bo" (｜) radical that strikes through both of the others is said to represent the isthmus that runs through the town.

=== Communities and neighborhoods ===
==== Central ====
- Fujihashi
- Kushimoto

==== Eastern ====
- Koza
- Nishi-Mukai
- Tahara

==== Southern ====
- Oshima
- Shiono-Misaki

==== Western ====
- Arita
- Tanami
- Wabuka

== Government ==
Kushimoto has a mayor-council form of government with a directly elected mayor and a unicameral town council of 13 members. Kushimoto, collectively with the other municipalities in Higashimuro District, contributes two members to the Wakayama Prefectural Assembly. In terms of national politics, the town is part of Wakayama 3rd district of the lower house of the Diet of Japan.

== Economy ==
Primary industries include horticulture and commercial fishing.

== Education ==
Kushimoto has nine public elementary schools and four public middle schools operated by the town government and one public high school operated by the Wakayama Prefectural Department of Education.

=== High schools ===
- Kushimoto Koza High School

=== Junior high schools ===
- Kushimoto Junior High School
- Kushimoto-Nishi Junior High School
- Nishi-Mukai Junior High School
- Shionomisaki Junior High School

=== Elementary schools ===
- Hashigui Elementary School
- Kushimoto Elementary School
- Koza Elementary School
- Izumo Elementary School
- Nishi-Mukai Elementary School
- Oshima Elementary School
- Shionomisaki Elementary School
- Tahara Elementary School
- Kushimoto Nishi Elementary School

== Transportation ==
=== Railway ===
JR West – Kisei Main Line

- Wabuka - Tako - Tanami - Kii-Arita - Kushimoto - Kii-Hime - Koza - Kii-Tahara

=== Highway ===
- Kisei Expressway
- National Route 42
- National Route 371

== Local attractions ==
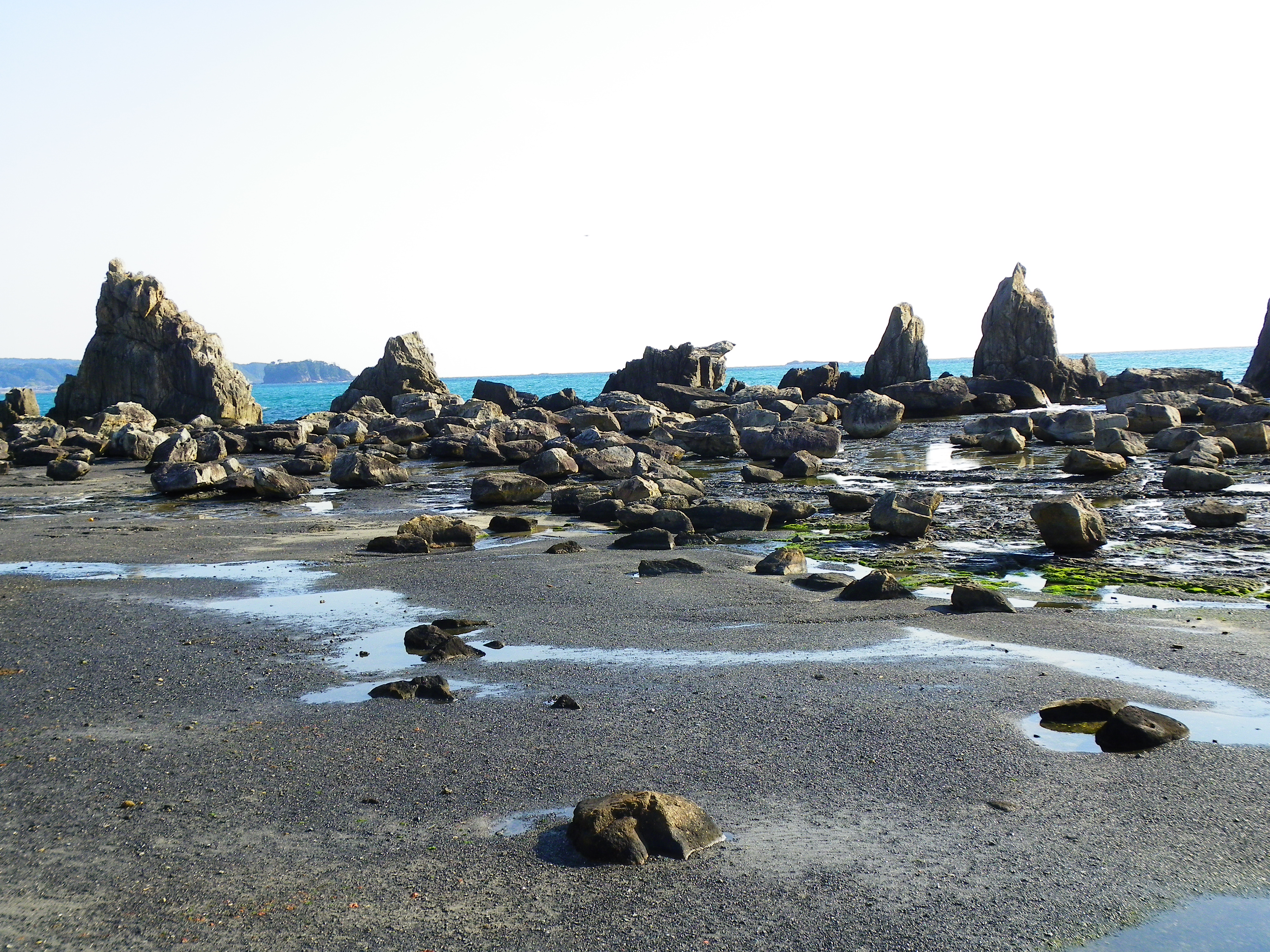
Hashigui-iwa

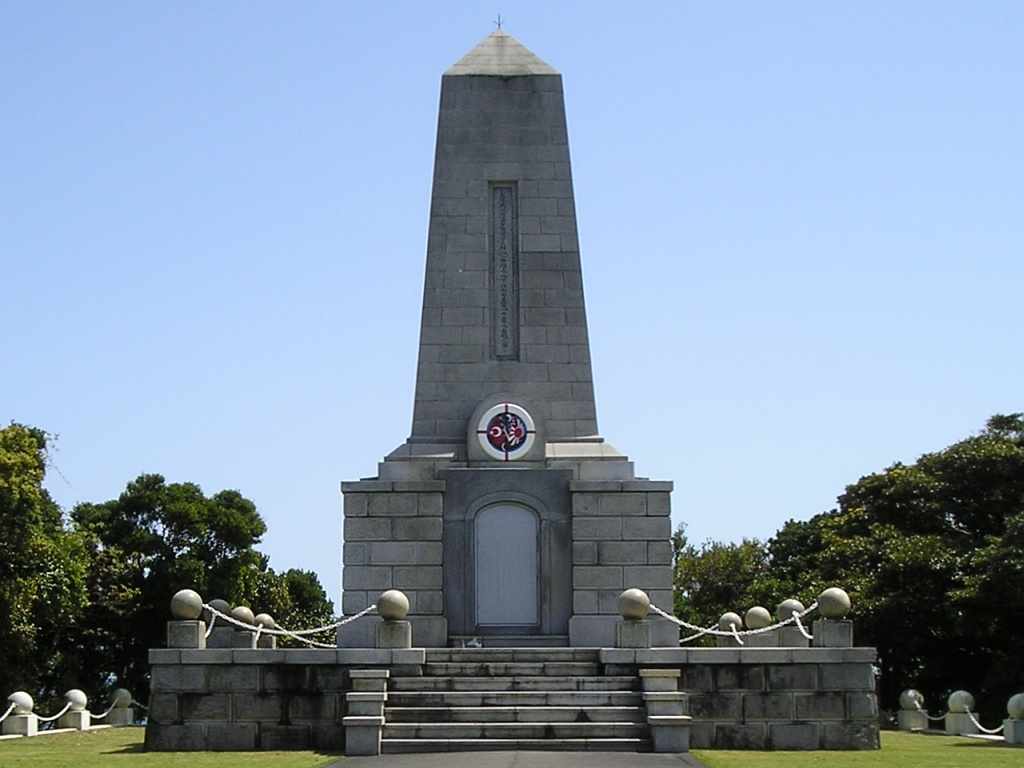
Ertuğrul Memorial

- Hashigui Beach
- Hashigui-Iwa Coastal Scenic Area
- Kashinosaki Lighthouse
- Koza Coastal Scenic Area
- Koza River
- Kuroshima and Taijima
- Kushimoto Marine Park
- Okyoro Art Museum
- Shionomisaki Lighthouse
- Shionomisaki Southernmost Point Park
- Shionomisaki Youth Hostel
- Turkish Memorial and Museum
- Umikongo Coastal Scenic Area
- United States Friendship Museum

Kushimoto is famous for its many coastal rock formations, including Hashigui-Iwa and Umikongo. Cape Shionomisaki, located in the southern tip of the town, has a park and tower marking the southernmost point of Honshū. The island of Kii-Oshima, connected to the main town via a bridge, is home to two museums:

- The Turkish Memorial and Museum, located on the southeastern end of the island, commemorates the foundering and sinking of the Turkish ship Ertugrul on the rocky Oshima shore. As of 2005, there was discussion of salvaging the wreckage with a Turkish team to exhibit it in the local museum.
- The United States Friendship Museum commemorates the visit of the brig Lady Washington and the brig Grace, which in 1791 took place decades before Commodore Matthew Perry's famed landing in Japan and opening of diplomatic relations with the United States. The museum also hosts a collection of American artifacts and items of nostalgia from its sister city, Hemet, in the United States.

Kushimoto had been the northernmost point where coral was found in Japan, beyond the Darwin Point of 29N latitude. Nevertheless, the meandering Kuroshio warm current that normally protects the coral, led to influx of cold water in 2018 that killed off most of the coral. Both water too hot or too cold can bleach coral.

=== Water sports ===
The surrounding wetlands and coastal areas in Kushimoto are designated areas of conservation through the Ramsar Convention of 1971. They have since become popular spots for scuba diving, with numerous diving establishments along National Highway 42.

The Kozagawa River, regulated by the Shichikawa Dam, is one of three rivers in southern Wakayama Prefecture known for kayaking.

Though waves are relatively tame compared with worldwide standards, Kushimoto is a popular surfing spot for locals and people from the bigger cities in the Kansai area.

=== Annual events and festivals ===
In late January or early February is the Shiono-Misaki Fire Festival. During this event, the large grassy field that designates Honshū's southernmost tip is ritually burned. Spectators may walk through the fire as it progresses through the field.

In February is the Oshima Boat Race. Festivals grounds are set up at Oshima Port, and two boats ritually race to and from the port on the mainland Kushimoto.

In August, the Summer Fireworks Festival takes place at Kushimoto Port.

In October is the Sunset Marathon. The marathon's route winds through Oshima and Shiono-Misaki.

== Notable people from Kushimoto ==
- Sanma Akashiya, TV comedian and actor

== Sister cities ==
Kushimoto has three sister cities:

- Yakakent, Turkey
- Mersin, Turkey
- Hemet, California, United States

Kushimoto has one friendship city:

- Torres Shire Council, Australia

== See also ==
- 125 Years Memory: Drama film commemorating the 125th anniversary of the Ertuğrul incident
