= Ottoman frigate Ertuğrul =

Ottoman frigate (launched 1863, sunk 1890)

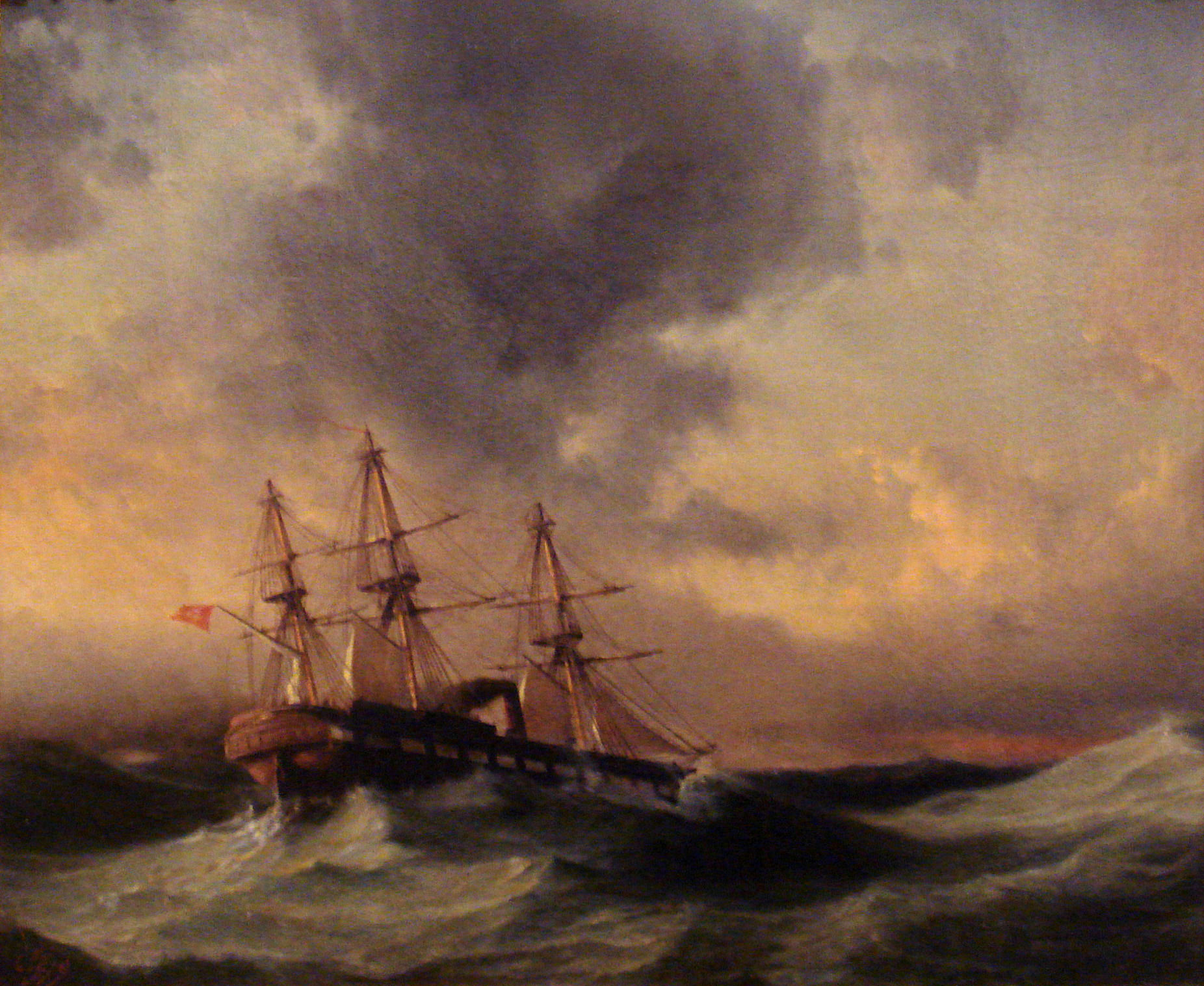
- Voyage of the frigate Ertuğrul to Japan, by Major general Osman Nuri Pasha (1839-1906).

History

Ottoman Empire
- Name: Ertuğrul
- Launched: 19 October 1863
- Fate: Sunk off Kushimoto, Japan; on 18 September 1890

General characteristics
- Class & type: Frigate
- Tons burthen: 2,344 tons
- Length: 79 m (260 ft)
- Beam: 15.5 m (51 ft)
- Draft: 8 m (26 ft)
- Depth of hold: 25.6 m (84 ft)
- Propulsion: two horizontal engines of 600 hp
- Armament: 8× 15 cm Krupp guns, 5× 150 lb (68 kg) Armstrong guns, 2× 4, 2× 3 font Krupps, 2× 5-barreled Hotchkiss guns, 2× 5-barreled, 4× Nordenfelt guns, 1× 12 lb (5.4 kg) and 1× 6 lb (2.7 kg) rocket launcher, 1× torpedo launcher, 2× torpedoes, 100× Martini-Henry rifles, 100× Winchester rifles, 40× pistols

Ertuğrul, launched in 1863, was a sailing frigate of the Ottoman Navy. While returning from a goodwill voyage to Japan in 1890, she encountered a typhoon off the Kushimoto coast of Wakayama Prefecture. It subsequently drifted into a reef and sank. The shipwreck resulted in the loss of more than 500 sailors and officers, including Rear Admiral Ali Osman Pasha. Only 69 sailors and officers survived and returned home later aboard two Japanese corvettes. The event is still commemorated as a foundation stone of Japanese-Turkish friendship.

== Ship ==
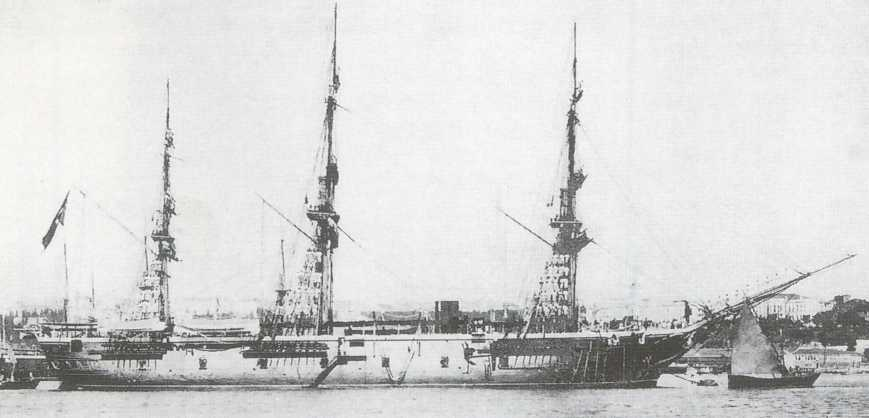
Ertuğrul

Ertuğrul, ordered in 1854 by Ottoman Sultan Abdulaziz (reigned 1861–1876), was built in the Taşkızak Shipyard (Tersâne-i Âmire) in Galata, an area of Istanbul (previously known as Constantinople) and was launched on 19 October 1863 in presence of the Sultan. She was named for Ertuğrul (13th century), the father of Osman I, founder of the Ottoman Empire. A three-mast wooden ship, she was 79 m (260 ft) long, 15.5 m (51 ft) wide and had a draft of 8 m (26 ft).

The frigate sailed to England in 1864, where she had steam engines and state of the art machinery installed, including electrical lighting.

On 18 February 1865, she left Portsmouth to return home with two other ships of the Ottoman Navy, Kosova and Hüdavendigâr, visiting some French and Spanish ports on the way. After arriving in Istanbul, she anchored awhile in the Bosphorus in front of the Dolmabahçe Palace and later took part in the campaign against the Cretan Revolt in 1866. Subsequently, she was locked up in Golden Horn during the reign of Abdul Hamid II (1876–1909).

== Japanese-Ottoman relations ==
In November 1878, the sloop Seiki (清輝) of the Japanese Imperial Navy arrived in Istanbul en route to a training mission in Europe, and the envoy was received by Sultan Abdul Hamid II and honored with various medals. In 1881, a mission led by diplomat Masaharu Yoshida (吉田 正春 Yoshida Masaharu) came to the Ottoman's Yıldız Palace, in an effort to conclude agreements relating to trade and wartime status. Upon the visit of Prince Komatsu Akihito to Istanbul in October 1887 and the presentation of Japan's highest order, the Order of the Chrysanthemum, to the Sultan, the government of the Ottoman Empire decided to send a ship on a goodwill voyage to Japan in return.

== Appointment ==
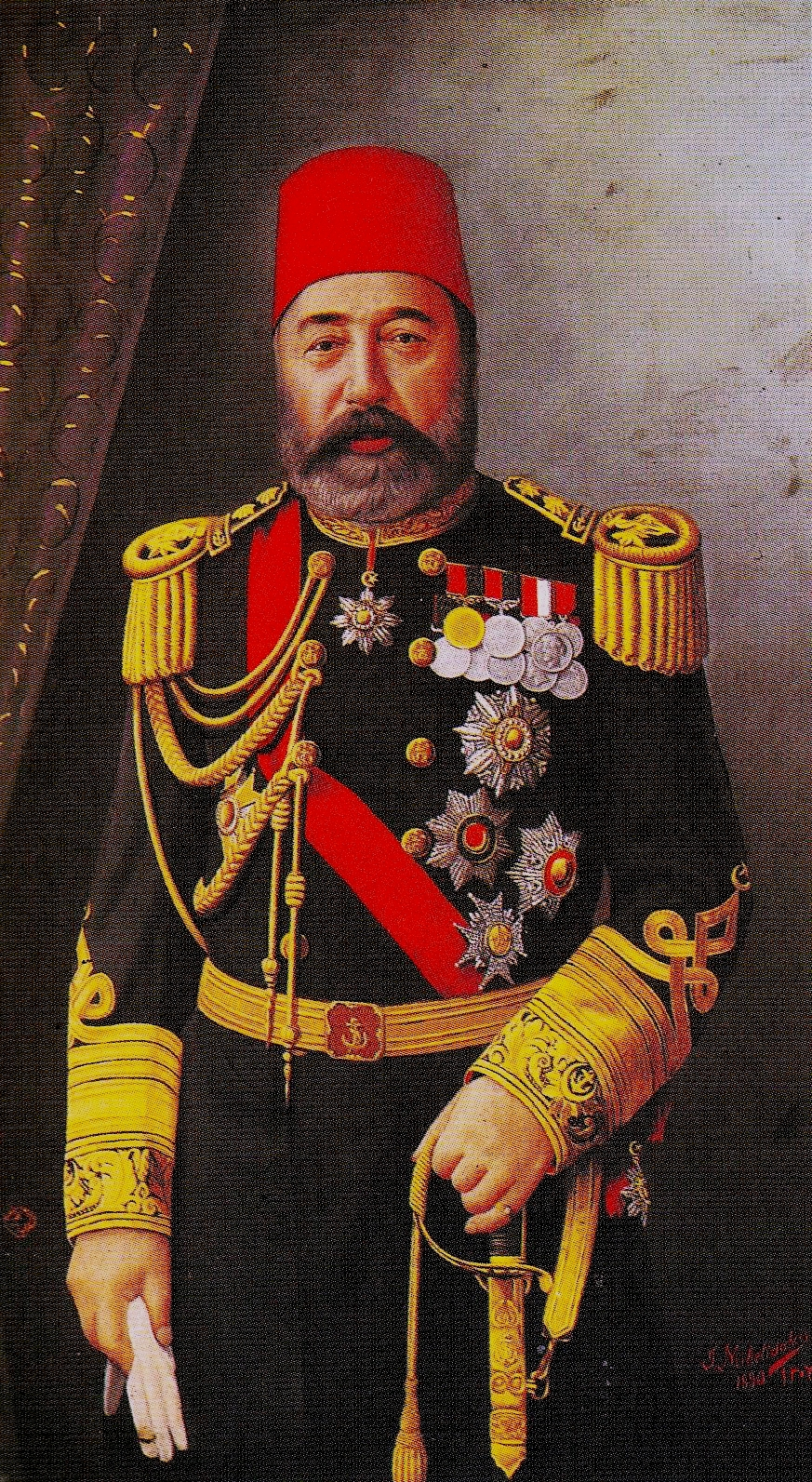
Head of the navy, Bozcaadalı Hasan Hüsnü Pasha

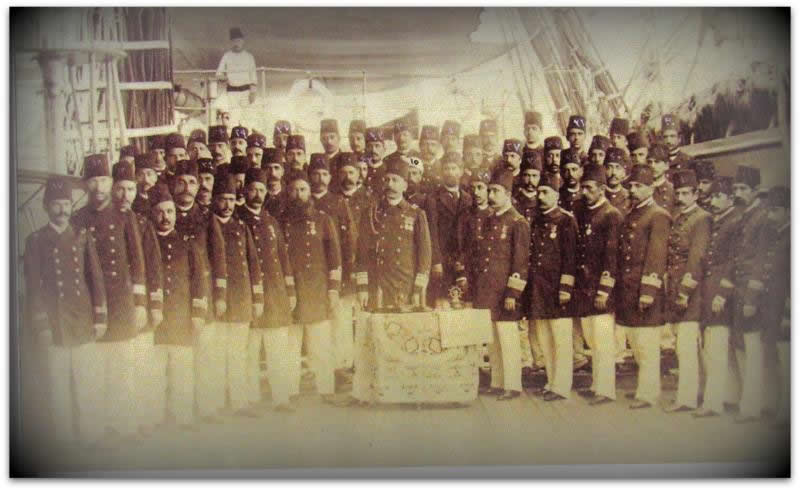
The crew of Frigate Ertuğrul, Middle: Rear Admiral Ali Osman Pasha

The Grand Vizier Kâmil Pasha sent a note on 14 February 1889 to the head of the navy, Bozcaadalı Hasan Hüsnü Pasha, asking the name and possible departure date of a battleship, which was suitable to sail to the seas of Indo-China and Japan in order to put the theoretical knowledge of the Naval Academy graduates into practice.

On 25 February 1889, Hasan Hüsnü Pasha informed the Grand Vizier that the frigate Ertuğrul was suitable for the assignment and could accomplish the preparations required within one week and set sail within one month. The real reason of the journey and its importance was revealed then by the Grand Vizier as a goodwill visit to Japan for the presentation of gifts and the highest decoration of the Ottoman Empire, "Medal of High Honor", from the Sultan to the Japanese Emperor. Another aim of the voyage was to show the flag on the Indian Ocean.

On 6 April 1889, the naval ministry appointed as commanding officer Captain Ali Osman Bey, the most appropriate officer due to his knowledge of several foreign languages and his skills in seamanship.

== Voyage to Japan ==
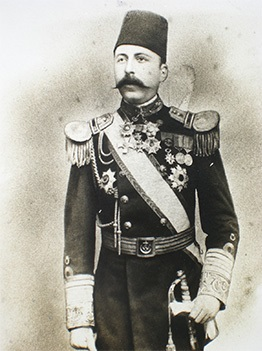
Rear Admiral Ali Osman Pasha

The ship, in service for 25 years, was overhauled shortly before the voyage, and most of the hull's wooden parts were renewed.

Ertuğrul, with 607 (disputed figure) sailors — including 57 officers — on board, was instructed to set sail from Istanbul on 14 July 1889, with Captain Ali Osman Bey commanding.

The initial route was designed to make various necessary stops on the way. The first stop was planned in Marmaris, and the next one in Port Said before the passage through the Suez Canal. Visits in Aden and Somalia would follow the stay in Jeddah. Considering the seasonal winds, the ship would stop by at Pondicherry and Calcutta in India. After staying in Port Akabod and Singapore, she would carry on to Malacca by way of the Strait of Malacca. Proceeding to the north, the ship would stop by in Saigon and then in some docks in China to arrive in Hong Kong. Amoy and Shanghai would be the last stops before reaching Japan. Finally, after a stay in Nagasaki, the ship would arrive her destination in Yokohama. The return was scheduled in October of the same year.

The ship experienced some problems during her long journey. On 26 July 1889, she entered the Suez Canal and ran ashore in Great Bitter Lake, destroyed the stern post and lost the rudder. After repairs, Ertuğrul set sail again on 23 September. While sailing in western Indian Ocean, the ship took on water from the bow. The crew was unable to conduct the necessary repairs until they reached Singapore. Ertuğrul was repaired in Singapore and departed on 22 March 1890. After a ten-day stop in Saigon, she arrived in Yokohama on 7 June 1890. The journey from Istanbul lasted around eleven months. Captain Ali Osman Bey was promoted to the rank of (Commodore/Rear Admiral) during the journey.

In Yokohama, Rear Admiral Ali Osman Pasha and the officers were received by Emperor Meiji of Japan on 13 June 1890. The gifts and the medal sent by Sultan Abdul Hamid II were presented to their intended recipients. Ali Osman Pasha was honored with the First Class Order of the Rising Sun, and Skipper Ali Bey with the Third Class Order of the Rising Sun. Other navy officers were also decorated with medals. Subsequently, Ottoman officers were received by the Empress. On 14 June 1890, young Prince Yoshihito Haru received the Ottoman rear admiral. On the following days, many receptions, dinners and ceremonies took place.

During her stay of three months in Japan, Ertuğrul frigate lost twelve crew members to epidemic.

== Shipwreck ==
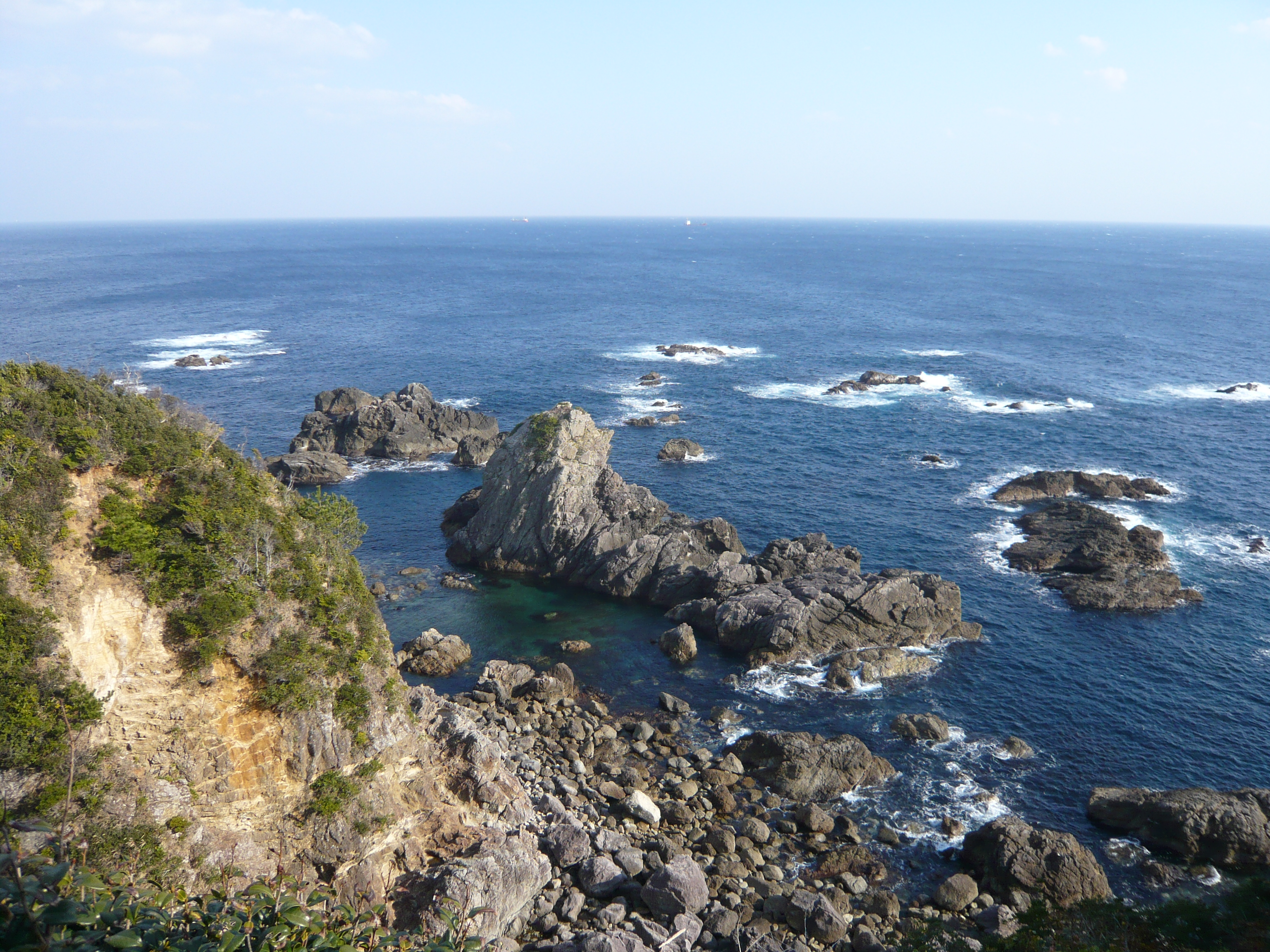
Collision site off Kii Ōshima.

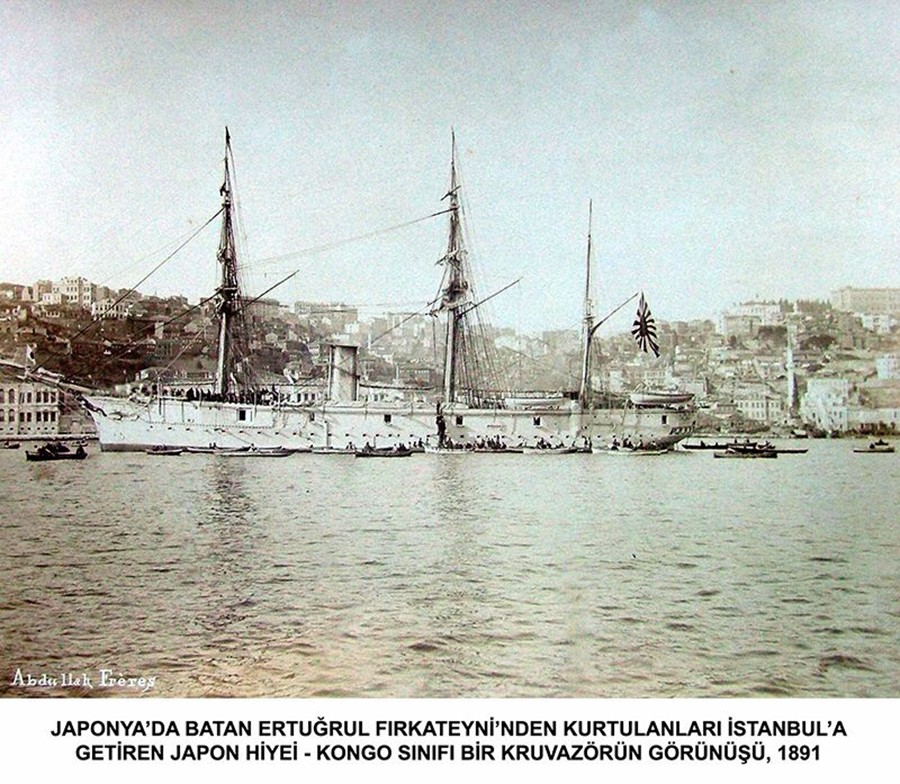
A view of the Japanese Hiei, a Kongō class corvette that brought the survivors of the frigate Ertuğrul that sank in Japan to Constantinople (now Istanbul), 1891.

At noon on 15 September 1890, Ertuğrul set sail from Yokohama for Istanbul. At the time of departure, the weather conditions were good, but the next morning a reverse wind began to blow, getting stronger towards the evening. By nightfall, the wind came from below the bow so that the sails had to be folded. At the same time, violent waves began beating against the ship, which, under severe trial, could hardly make headway. The 40 m (130 ft) high mizzen mast collapsed and caused severe damage by shaking from side to side and banging into the other (rigging) sails. While the storm continued gaining power, waves coming from the bow separated the deck boards from the front. Water broke through into the coal depots in the boiler room. Over the next four days, the crew tried to repair the damage by remedying the sails and tightening the shrouds. They also continuously tried to empty the water out of the coal containers (which were the ones most seriously in danger) using buckets, since the pumps were insufficient.

Despite all their efforts, the ship's disintegration was imminent and the only option was to seek sanctuary in a nearby port. They headed to Kobe, within 10 miles (16 km) of the ship, in the gulf beyond the Kashinozaki Cape with Oshima Lighthouse. Seawater breaking through finally extinguished one of the furnaces in the engine room. Almost immobile without main sails and sufficient propulsion, and having only the wind and the waves behind, Ertuğrul drifted towards the dangerous rocks at the eastern coast of Kii Ōshima. As the crew tried just to stop the ship before the rocks by emergency anchoring, the ship hit the reefs and fell apart at the first impact around midnight on 18 September 1890.

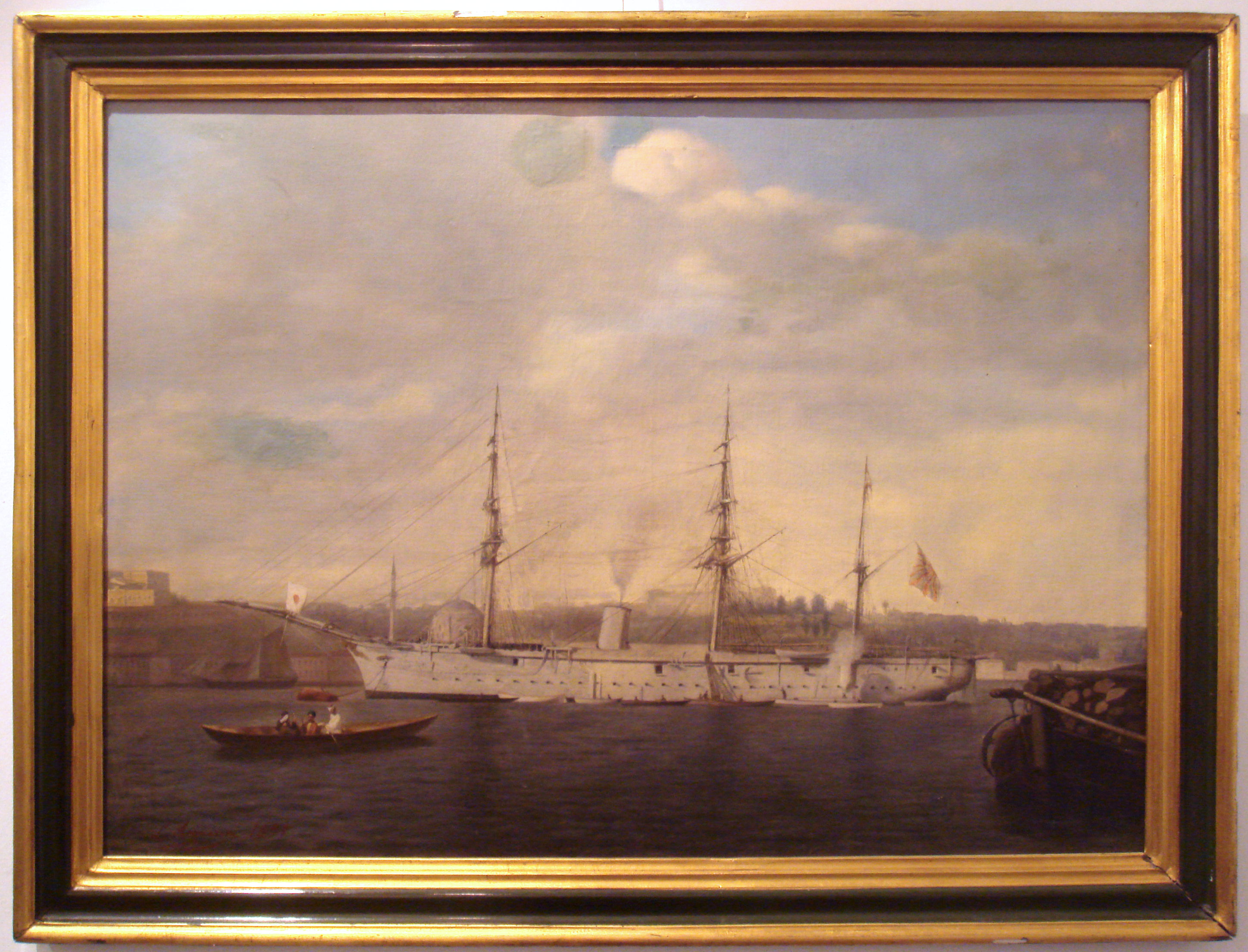
The Japanese Cruiser Kongō in Constantinople, 1891, by Luigi Acquarone (1800–1896).

At the site of the incident, more than 500 sailors, of whom fifty were officers including the commander Rear Admiral Ali Osman Pasha, lost their lives. Only six officers and sixty-three sailors survived. Six of the survivors were uninjured, nine severely wounded and the others sustained light injuries. After the rescue operation, two survivors were taken to Kobe by Japanese ships, two more by a Japanese warship and sixty-five by the German gunboat Wolf. All of the sixty-nine survivors were transported back to Istanbul aboard the Japanese corvettes Kongō and Hiei, leaving Shinagawa, Tokyo, in October 1890. The Sultan met with the officers of the Japanese ships on 5 January 1891 and expressed his appreciation for the relief operation by decorating them with medals.

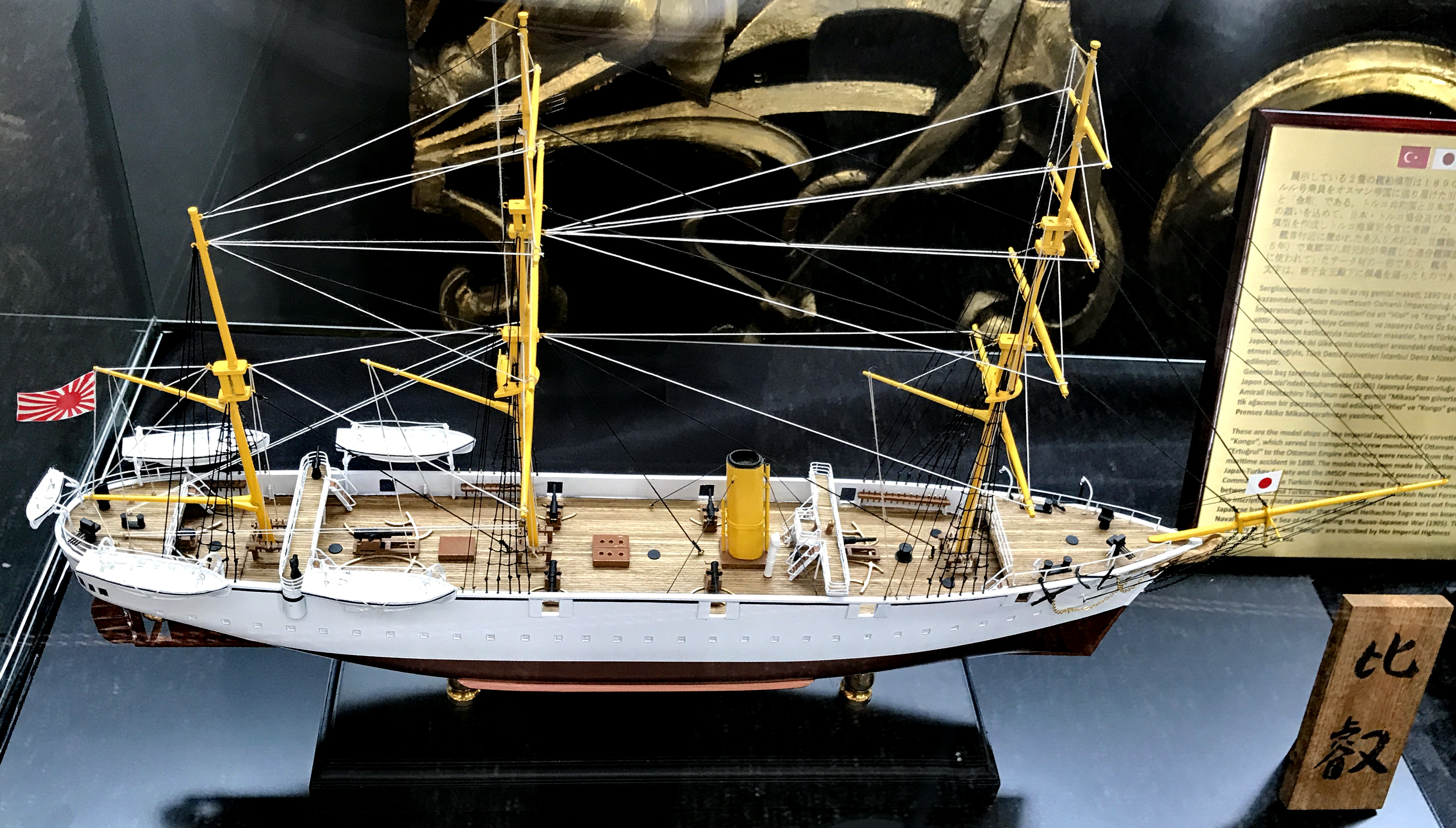
Hiei

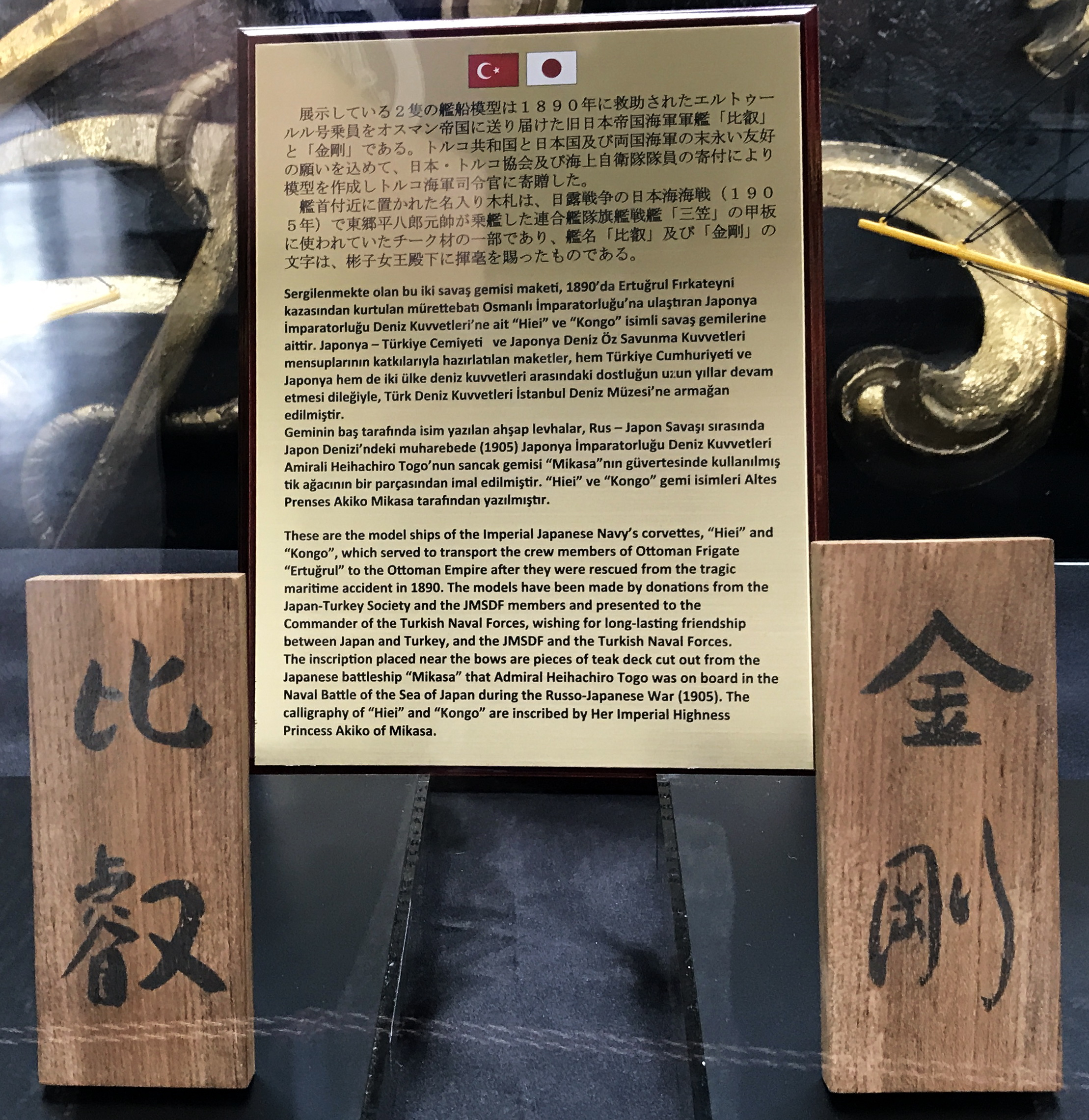
Template

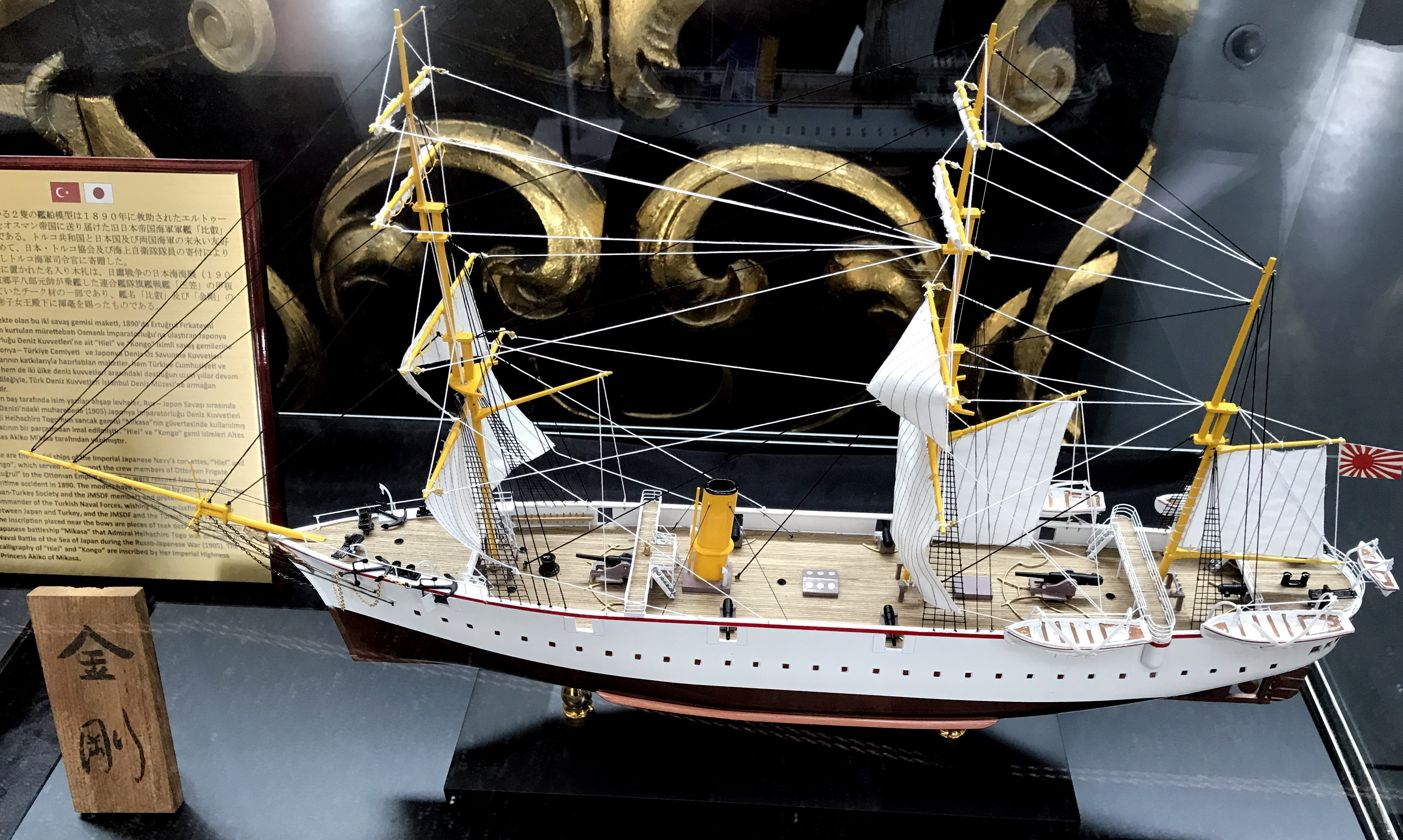
Kongō

Scale models of Kongō and Hiei displayed at Istanbul Naval Museum

== Commemoration ==
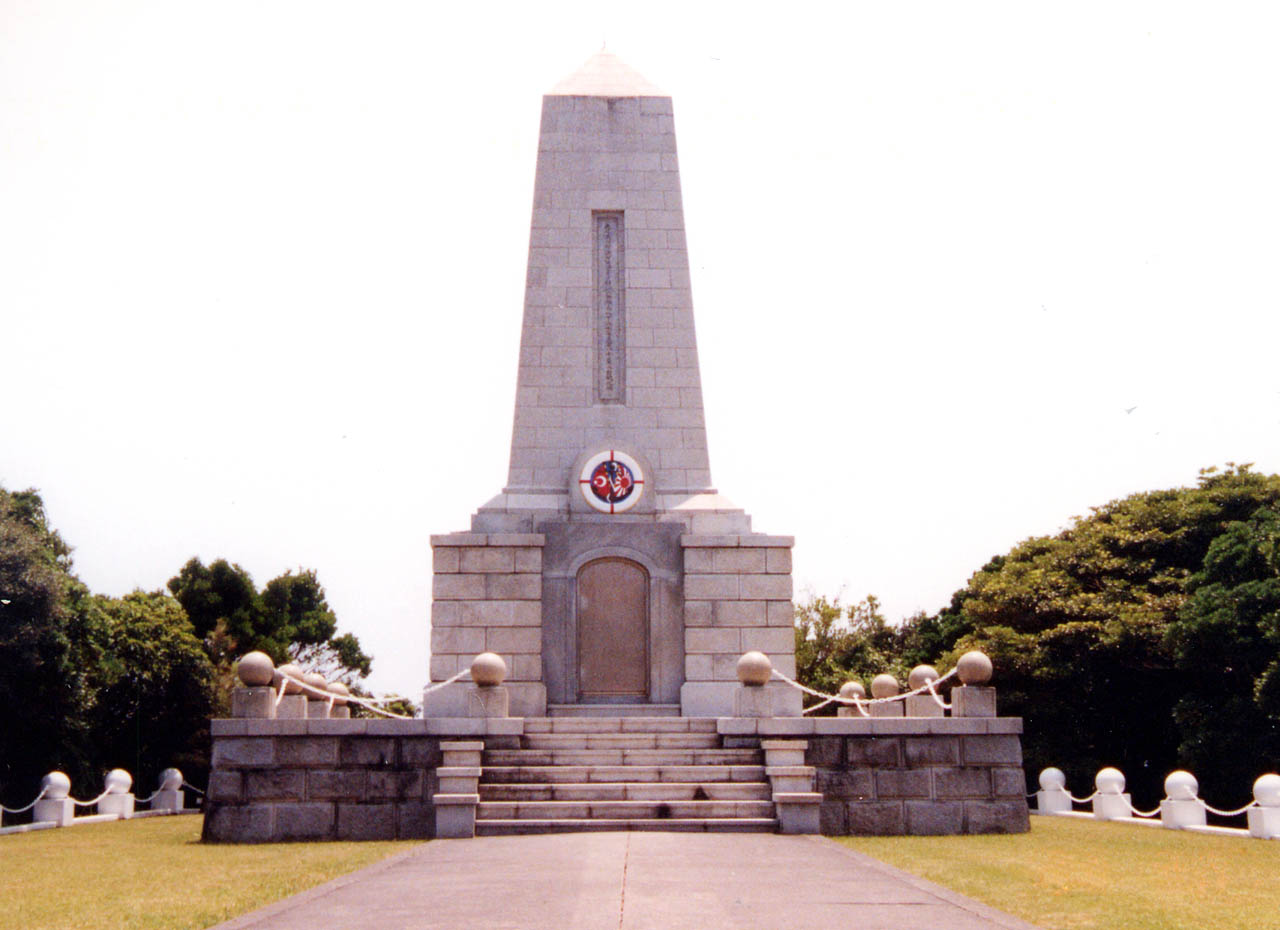
Frigate Ertuğrul Memorial in Kushimoto, Japan.

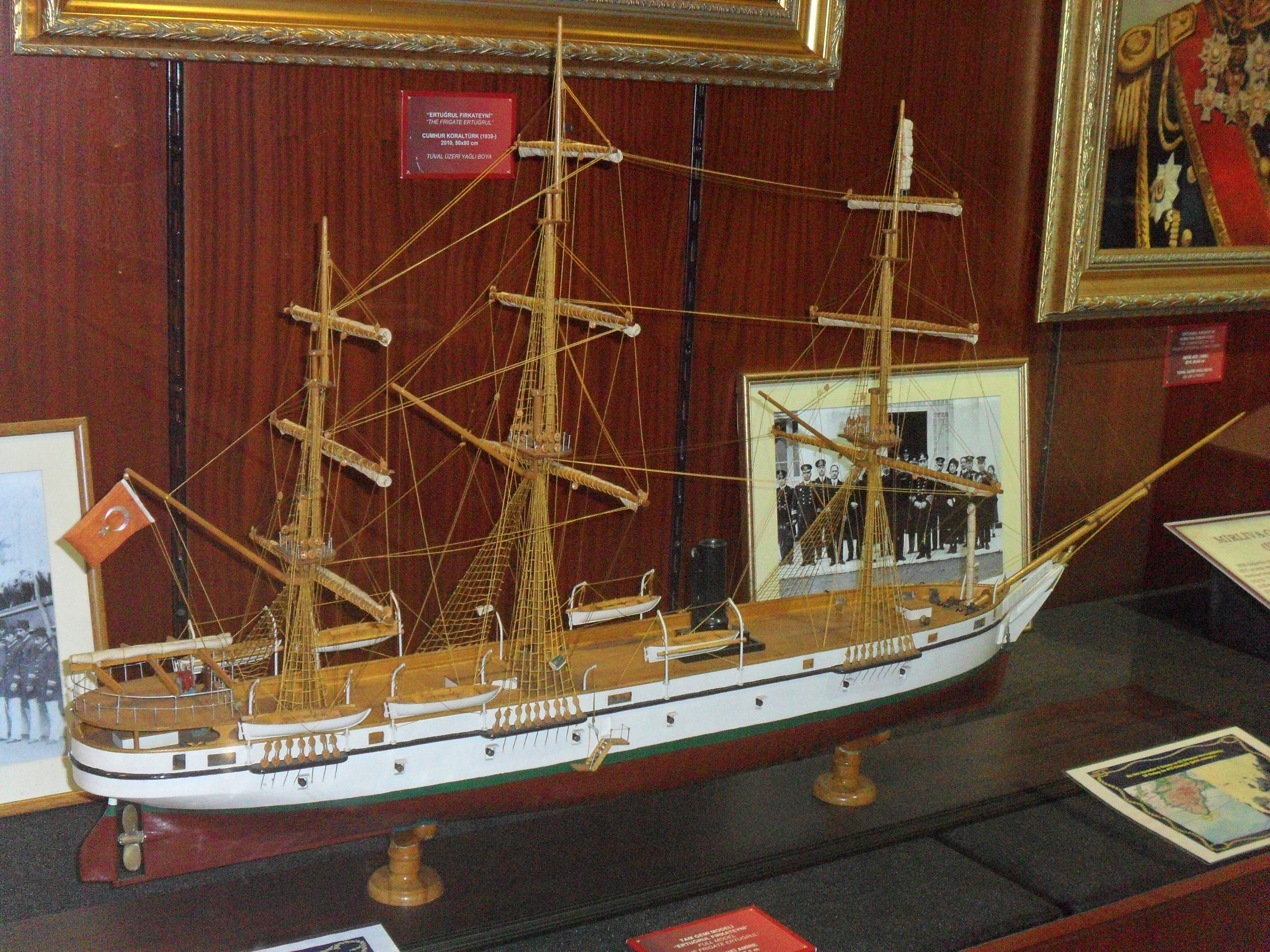
A scale model of Ertuğrul on display at the Mersin Naval Museum

This accident created a general sympathy in Japan for Turkish people and led to the establishment of a strong basis for which friendship between Turkey and Japan was to later flourish.

In February 1891, a cemetery was established for the 150 bodies recovered from the sea, and a memorial next to it was built near the lighthouse in the town of Kushimoto, Wakayama. On 3 June 1929, Emperor Hirohito visited the cemetery, which was extended the same year. Turkey renovated the monument in 1939.

In 1974, a "Turkish Museum" was established in Kushimoto, in which a scale model of the ship, photographs and statues of the sailors are on exhibition.

The event is commemorated every five years on the day of the accident in Kushimoto, with the participation of high-level officials from Turkey and Japan. In June 2008, Turkish president Abdullah Gül, visiting Japan officially, proceeded from Tokyo to Kushimoto to take part at a commemoration together with regional officials.

A Japanese-Turkish drama film about the event, 125 Years Memory, was released in 2015.

== Salvaging the wreckage ==
On 4 January 2007, an underwater archaeological project started the excavation of the wreck as a collaboration of the Institute of Nautical Archaeology (INA) in Bodrum, Yapı Kredi Retirement Partnership and the Turkish Foundation of Nautical Archaeology. It is intended to exhibit the remains of the ship in the museum next to the Ertuğrul Monument in Kashino, Kushimoto. American and Japanese nautical archaeologists and historians joined the excavation team.

On 28 January 2008, the team of archaeologists, under the leadership of Tufan Turanlı (director of INA-Bodrum at the time), reached the ammunition store section of the wreck in a dive during the second phase of the underwater excavation project. Three cannonballs, each 40 kg (88 lb), of the ship's Krupp naval guns, tens of bullets and pieces of naval mines were recovered and safely brought to the Port of Kushimoto, where explosive experts of local police, the Japan Ground Self-Defense Force and Navy examined them. The artifacts were later taken to Ertuğrul Research Institute for conservation. Turanlı recalled that two Winchester rifles recovered earlier are on exhibition in the museum.

== See also ==
- Kushimoto Turkish Memorial and Museum
- 125 Years Memory
- Torajiro Yamada
- Mersin Martyrs' Memorial
- Turkish military memorials and cemeteries outside Turkey
- List of maritime accidents and disasters by death toll
- Blue Heritage Project

== Bibliography ==
- Apatay, Çetinkaya. Ertugrul Firkateyni'nin Öyküsü (in Turkish). Milliyet Yayınları. p. 318. ISBN 975-313-013-9. Archived from the original on 2022-01-22.
