= List of wars involving Iraq =

This is a list of wars involving the Republic of Iraq and its predecessor states. For more of Iraq predecessor states, see List of conflicts in Iraq.

Conflict	Combatant 1	Combatant 2	Results	Iraqi losses		Head of State	Prime Minister
Conflict	Combatant 1	Combatant 2	Results	Military	Civilians	Head of State	Prime Minister
Mesopotamian Campaign (1914–1918; World War I)	Ottoman Empire; Al-Muntafiq Union; Kurdish tribes; Arab tribes; Germany Jam'iya al-Nahda al-Islamiya (1918)	United Kingdom; India; Australia; New Zealand; Kuwait (1914); Assyrian volunteers	Allied victory: Partitioning of the Ottoman Empire	~89,500	~35,500	Mehmed VI (Ottoman rule)	Ahmet Tevfik Pasha (Ottoman rule)
Mahmud Barzanji Revolts (1919–1924)	Mandatory Iraq (United Kingdom) RAF Iraq Command (Assyrian homeland) Assyrian levies	Kurdish state: Barzinja tenantry and tribesmen; Hamavand tribe; Sections of the Jaf, Jabbari, Sheykh Bizayni and Shuan tribes; Kingdom of Kurdistan: Kurdish National Army	British-Assyrian victory: Kingdom of Kurdistan abolished in 1924; Sheykh Mahmud retreats to underground; Iraqi Kurdistan merged into Mandatory Iraq (1926); Kingdom of Kurdistan reconquered by the British	?	?	Before 1920: Sir Percy Cox (British High Commissioner) After 1920: King Faisal I	Before 1920: Sir Percy Cox (British High Commissioner) After 1920: Abd Al-Rahman Al-Gillani
Iraqi War of Independence (1920)	Iraqi rebels: Al-ʽAhd; Haras Al-Istiqlal; Arab tribesmen; Kurdish tribesmen	(United Kingdom of Great Britain and Ireland) United Kingdom: Iraq Levies	British victory: Anglo-Iraqi treaty (Note: Including greater autonomy for Iraq, the installation of Faysal ibn Husayn as King of Iraq, and cancellation of the British Mandate for Mesopotamia.); Creation of Kingdom of Iraq under British Administration	6,000–10,000	2,050–4,000	None	
Ikhwan revolt (1927–1930)	Hejaz and Nejd: House of Saud; Allied Arab clans; United Kingdom: Royal Air Force; Kuwait; Iraq; Allied Arab clans	Ikhwan: Otaibah; Mutayr; Ajman	Allied victory	2,000 killed in total		Faisal I of Iraq	Faisal bin Sultan
Yazidi Revolt (1935)	Kingdom of Iraq	Yazidi tribes	Revolts suppressed: Sinjar mountains put under military control	?	?	Ghazi of Iraq	Ali Jawdat al-Ayyubi
Iraqi Shia Revolts (1935–1936)	Kingdom of Iraq	Iraqi Shia tribesmen Ikha Party	Revolts suppressed	~500		Ghazi of Iraq	Ali Jawdat al-Ayyubi
Iraqi Coup D'état (1941)	Iraq	Golden Square	Golden Square victory: Overthrow of government of 'Abd al-Ilah; Formation of National Defence Government; British intervention in Iraq	?		Faisal II of Iraq	Taha al-Hashimi
Anglo-Iraqi War (1941 WWII)	Iraq (Golden Square); Military support: Germany; Italy; Vichy France	United Kingdom: India; (Assyrian homeland) Assyrian levies; Mandatory Palestine; Transjordan; Iraq (Abd Al-Ilah loyalists) Air and naval support: Australia (Note: HMAS Yarra, representing Australia, participated at sea.); New Zealand (Note: HMNZS Leander, representing New Zealand, participated at sea.); Greece (Note: Greek airmen undergoing training at Habbaniya flew sorties against the Iraqis.)	Allied victory: Rebellion suppressed	~500	?	Sherif Sharaf	Rashid Ali al-Gaylani
Barzani Revolt (1943–1945)	Kingdom of Iraq	Barzani tribesmen Allied Kurdish tribes	Iraqi victory: Revolt suppressed	?		Faisal II of Iraq	Nuri al-Said
Al-Wathbah Uprising (1948)	(Iraq) Iraqi Police	Student Cooperation Committee (communists); Progressive Democrats Populists; Kurdish Democrats; Student wings of the National Democratic Party and the Independence Party	Victory: Restoration of order; More demonstrations in spring 1948	300–400		Faisal II of Iraq	Mohammad Hassan al-Sadr
First Arab–Israeli War (1948–1949)	Arab League: Egypt; All-Palestine Protectorate (Note: After 22 September 1948); Holy War Army; Transjordan; Iraq; Syria; Lebanon (Note: Lebanon had decided to not participate in the war and only took part in the battle of al-Malikiya on 5–6 June 1948.); Saudi Arabia; Yemen Irregulars: Arab Liberation Army; Al-Najjada; Holy War Army	Israel Before 26 May 1948: (Israel) Yishuv; Paramilitary groups: Haganah; Palmach; Hish; Him; Irgun; Lehi; Allied Bedouin tribes After 26 May 1948: Israel Defense Forces; Minorities Unit; Foreign volunteers: Mahal	Defeat: Arab League invasion of former Mandatory Palestine repelled; 1949 Armistice Agreements; Establishment of the State of Israel, Jordanian annexation of the West Bank, Egyptian occupation of the Gaza Strip; 1948 Palestinian expulsion and flight; Beginning of the Palestinian Fedayeen insurgency	?	None	Faisal II of Iraq	Muzahim al-Pachachi
14 July Revolution (1958)	Arab Federation: Kingdom of Iraq; Royal Guard; Supported by: Kingdom of Jordan	(Iraq) Free Officers: 19th Brigade; 20th Brigade	Free Officers Victory: Overthrow of the Iraqi monarchy; Death of King Faisal II and his family; Execution of Prince Abd al-Ilah; Execution of Prime Minister Nuri al-Said; End of the Hashemite dynasty in Iraq; End of the Arab Federation; Establishment of the Iraqi Republic	~100		Faisal II of Iraq	Nuri al-Said
Mosul Uprising (1959)	(Iraq) Iraqi Government: Communist Party; Arab, Kurdish and Assyrian peasants	Arab nationalists: Ba'ath Party; (Arab Revolt) Sympathetic Arab tribes; Supported by: United Arab Republic; United States: CIA (alleged)	Attempted coup fails: Iraq remains outside of the UAR; Degradation in Iraq-UAR relations; Iraqi Communists increase in power; Iraqi Ba'athists begin to increase in strength	2,426		Muhammad Najib ar-Ruba'i	Abd al-Karim Qasim
First Iraqi–Kurdish War (1961–1970)	Before 1968: Iraq; Syria (1963); Supported by: United States (from 1963) After 1968: Ba'athist Iraq	KDP; Yazidis; Assyrians; Supported by: Iran; Israel; United States (alleged)Wolfe-Hunnicutt 2021, pp. 102	Military stalemate: Several Iraqi offensives intended to suppress the Kurdish rebellion fail; Iraqi–Kurdish Autonomy Agreement; Arabization program continued; Second Iraqi–Kurdish War in 1974	~10,000	?	Muhammad Najib ar-Ruba'i	Abd al-Karim Qasim
Ramadan Revolution (1963)	Iraqi Government: Iraqi Armed Forces; Iraqi Communist Party	Iraqi Ba'ath Party: Iraqi Armed Forces (Ba'athist elements); National Guard militia; Supported by: United States	Iraqi Ba'athist victory: Overthrow of Abd al-Karim Qasim; Establishment of Ba'athist government	100		Muhammad Najib ar-Ruba'i	Abd al-Karim Qasim
Ar-Rashid Revolt (1963)	(Iraq) Iraqi Government: Ba'ath Party; Ba'ath National Guard Militia	Iraqi Communist Party (Iraq) Iraqi Army	Coup attempt defeated: Revolt suppressed	1+		Abdul Salam Arif	Ahmed Hassan al-Bakr
November coup d'état (1963)	(Iraq) Ba'athists	Nasserists	Nasserist victory: Overthrow of Ba'ath Party government * Establishment of pro-Nasserist government; Ahmad Hassan al-Bakr became Vice President of Iraq	250		Abdul Salam Arif	Ahmed Hassan al-Bakr
Six-Day War (1967)	Egypt; Syria; Jordan; Iraq; Minor involvement: Lebanon	Israel	Defeat: Israel occupies a total of 70,000 km^{2} (27,000 sq mi) of territory: The Golan Heights from Syria; The West Bank including East Jerusalem from Jordan; The Gaza Strip and the Sinai Peninsula from Egypt	10	None	Abdul Rahman Arif	Abdul Rahman Arif
17 July Revolution (1968)	(Iraq) Iraqi Government: Arab Socialist Union	Iraqi Ba'ath Party (Iraq) Iraqi Armed Forces Supported by: United States (alleged)	Ba’ath victory: Overthrow of Abdul Rahman Arif and Tahir Yahya; Establishment of Ba'athist Iraq		Ahmed Hassan al-Bakr	Ahmed Hassan al-Bakr	
Yom Kippur War (1973)	Egypt; Syria; Expeditionary forces Saudi Arabia Algeria Jordan Libya Iraq Kuwait Tunisia Morocco Cuba North Korea	Israel	Defeat: Invasion of Israeli-held territories repelled; Agreement on Disengagement and Egypt–Israel peace treaty	278	None	Ahmed Hassan al-Bakr	Ahmed Hassan al-Bakr
Second Iraqi–Kurdish War (1974–1975)	Iraq; Supported by: Soviet Union	KDP; Yazidis; Iran; Supported by: Israel; United States	Iraqi victory: KDP military and strategic failure; Peshmerga fighting ability destroyed; KDP–Iraq cease-fire; Failed PUK low-level insurgency; Iran withdrew its support for KDP; 1975 Algiers Agreement; Iraqi government reinstates full control over Kurdish-majority territories	7,000	?	Ahmed Hassan al-Bakr	Ahmed Hassan al-Bakr
Arvand Conflict (1974–1975)	Iraq	Iran KDP	Iranian victory: 1975 Algiers Agreement; Iraq cedes half of the Arvand River to Iran; Iran cedes territory around Zain al Qaws and Saif Saad to Iraq; Iraqi federal government reinstates full control over Kurdish-majority territories; Tensions between Iran and Iraq escalate into a full-scale war in 1980			Saddam Hussein	Saddam Hussein
Iran–Iraq War (1980–1988)	Iraq DRFLA; MEK; NCRI; PKDI; Salvation Force; Arab volunteers (Note: from: Egypt; Jordan; Morocco; North Yemen; Sudan; Tunisia)	Iran KDP; PUK; ISCI; Islamic Dawa Party; Hezbollah; Shia volunteers (Note: from: Afghanistan; Iraq; Lebanon; Pakistan; Kuwait; Bahrain; India)	Inconclusive (Note: Iraq claimed victory following a successful 1988 counter-offensive aimed at expelling Iranian forces from Iraq which compelled Iran to submit to a ceasefire the same year, and also due to the country becoming the dominant power in the Middle East as a result of the conflict, while Iran also claimed victory for expelling Iraqi forces from Iran following 1982 offensives, despite failing in its later-goal to overthrow the Iraqi government and also despite suffering higher military and economic losses than Iraq.): Status quo ante bellum (Note: After the war concluded, Iraq continued to maintain control over the entire Shatt al-Arab and other Iranian territories it had occupied along the border, covering an area of 9,600 km^{2}. It was not until 16 August 1990 that Iraq agreed to return these occupied territories back to Iran and to divide sovereignty over the Shatt al-Arab. This restored the border to the terms established by the 1975 Algiers Agreement.)	105,000; 375,000	~100,000	Saddam Hussein	Saddam Hussein
Invasion of Kuwait (1990)	Iraqi Republic	State of Kuwait	Iraqi victory: UNSC Resolution 660 condemns invasion on 2 August; UNSC Resolution 661 imposes international sanctions against Iraq and declares Kuwait's right to self-defence on 6 August; UNSC Resolution 662 designates Iraqi occupation/annexation of Kuwait as illegal on 9 August; UNSC Resolution 665 authorizes naval blockade against Iraq on 25 August; Iraq establishes the "Republic of Kuwait" on 2 August and annexes it on 28 August; Northern Kuwait becomes the Saddamiyat al-Mitla' District within Iraq's Basra Governorate; Southern Kuwait becomes Iraq's Kuwait Governorate	295+	None	Saddam Hussein	Saddam Hussein
Gulf War (1990–1991)	Iraq	United States; United Kingdom; France; Saudi Arabia; Egypt; Kuwait; (United Nations) Coalition: Afghan mujahideen; Argentina; Australia; Bahrain; Bangladesh; Belgium; Canada; Czechoslovakia; Denmark; Germany; Greece; Honduras; Hungary; Italy; Japan; Luxembourg; Morocco; Netherlands; New Zealand; Niger; Norway; Oman; Pakistan; Philippines; Poland; Portugal; Qatar; Romania; Senegal; Sierra Leone; Singapore; South Korea; Spain; Sweden; Syria; Turkey; United Arab Emirates	Coalition victory: State of Kuwait resumes self-governance over all Kuwaiti sovereign territory; Establishment of a demilitarized zone and construction of a separation barrier along the Iraq–Kuwait border	20,000–35,000	3,664	Saddam Hussein	Saddam Hussein
1991 Iraqi uprisings (1991)	Government: Ba'ath Party; (Iraq) Iraqi Army; Republican Guard; Special Republican Guard; Popular Army; General Security; Intelligence Service; Special Security; Support: MEK	Shia and leftist elements of opposition: SCIRI/Badr Brigades; Dawa; Communist Party; (Iraq) Pro-Syrian Ba'athists; (Iraq) Army deserters/defectors Diplomatic Support: United States Military Support Iran	Iraqi government military victory (Southern Front): Imposition of the Iraqi no-fly zones by United States, United Kingdom and France	~5,000	80,000–230,000	Saddam Hussein	Saddam Hussein
1991 Iraqi uprisings (1991)	Government: Ba'ath Party; (Iraq) Iraqi Army; Republican Guard; Special Republican Guard; Popular Army; General Security; Intelligence Service; Special Security; Support: MEK	Kurdish rebels: Peshmerga: KDP; PUK; IMK; CPK; (Iraq) Jash deserters/defectors; PDKI; Diplomatic Support: United States; Military Support; Iran	Government Military Victory (Northern Front): Establishment of Kurdistan Region, facilitated by the imposition of the Iraqi no-fly zones by United States, United Kingdom and France	~5,000	80,000–230,000	Saddam Hussein	Saddam Hussein
Iraqi Kurdish Civil War (1995–1996)	KDP; Supported by: Iraq (from 1995); Turkey (from 1997); Iran (before 1995)	PUK; PKK; SCIRI; KCP; Iraqi National Congress; Supported by: Iran (from 1995) (Ba'athist Syria) Syria; United States (1996)	Washington Agreement: PKK moved to Qandil mountains from Bekaa Valley	?		Saddam Hussein	Saddam Hussein
Bombing of Iraq (1998)	Iraq	United States: United States Armed Forces; United Kingdom: Royal Air Force	Coalition military success Politically inconclusive: Much of Iraqi military infrastructure destroyed; Iraq bars weapon inspectors from returning; Iraq begins shooting at British and American planes in the Iraqi no-fly zones	1,400(KIA or WIA)	?	Saddam Hussein	Saddam Hussein
Second Sadr Uprising (1999)	Iraq: Iraqi Armed Forces; Republican Guard; Fedayeen Saddam; Ba'ath Party	Rebels: SCIRI / Badr; Dawa	Iraqi government victory: Uprising suppressed	40+	200+	Saddam Hussein	Saddam Hussein
Iraq War (2003–2011)	Invasion (2003) (Ba'athist Iraq) Republic of Iraq: MEK	Invasion (2003); Coalition of the willing: United States; United Kingdom; Australia; Poland; Kurdistan Region: KDP; PUK; Iraqi National Congress: Free Iraqi Forces	Defeat (Phase 1): Overthrow of Ba'ath Party-led regime (and execution of Saddam Hussein in 2006)	7,600–10,800	151,000–1,033,000+	Saddam Hussein	Saddam Hussein
Iraq War (2003–2011)	After invasion (2003–11); Iraq; United States; United Kingdom; MNF–I (2003–09); Kurdistan Region; Awakening Council	After invasion (2003–11); Al-Qaeda in Iraq; Islamic Army in Iraq; Islamic State of Iraq; Mahdi Army (Ba'athist Iraq) Naqshbandi Army; Hamas of Iraq; Jaysh al-Mujahideen; 1920 Revolution Brigades; Jamaat Ansar al-Sunna	Government victory (Phase 2): Re-establishment of democratic elections; U.S.–Iraq Status of Forces Agreement; Escalation of sectarian insurgency (leading to the rise of ISIL and re-escalation of war beginning in 2013)	17,690	151,000–1,033,000+	Jalal Talabani	Nouri al-Maliki
War in Iraq (2013–17)	Central government of Iraq; Iraqi Armed Forces; Iraqi Ground Forces; Iraqi Air Force; CTS-ISOF; Popular Mobilization Forces; Assyrian Forces (Iraqi command); Federal Police; Kurdistan Region; Peshmerga; Zeravani; Kurdistan Region Security Council; CTG Kurdistan; Parastin u Zanyari; Assyrian Forces (Kurdish command); Allied groups: Sinjar Alliance; PKK; Rojava; Kurdish National Council; Iraqi Turkmen Front; Iraqi Communist Party; Various self-defense groups; Others: Iran; Hezbollah; Liwa Zainebiyoun; Syria CJTF–OIR; United States; United Kingdom; Canada; Australia; France; Italy; Netherlands; New Zealand; Finland; Denmark	Islamic State: Sunni Insurgent Factions (2012–2015); (Ba'athist Iraq) Naqshbandi Army; Army of Pride and Dignity; Hamas of Iraq; Islamic Front for the Iraqi Resistance; GMCIR (2014); Free Iraqi Army (2013–2014); Islamic Army in Iraq (2013–2014); 1920 Revolution Brigades (2013–2015); Anbar Tribal Council (2013–2015)	Iraqi and allied victory	25,000+	67,000+	Fuad Masum	Haider al-Abadi
2017 Iraqi–Kurdish conflict (2017)	Iraq; Supported by: Iran	(Kurdistan Region) Kurdistan Regional Government PKK; PDKI; PAK White Flags (alleged)	Iraqi victory: Iraqi government forces defeat the Peshmerga and capture 20% of the territory controlled by the Kurdistan Region including the city of Kirkuk, along with the surrounding oil fields and border crossings.	None	None	Fuad Masum	Haider al-Abadi
Iraqi Insurgency (2017–present)	Iraq; Iraqi Federal Police; Iraqi Armed Forces; Special Operations Forces (SOF); Popular Mobilization Forces (PMF); Tribal Mobilization; Islamic Resistance in Iraq; Supported by: Iran Rojava (cross-border cooperation since May 2018); Supported by: CJTF-OIR: United States; United Kingdom; France; Kurdistan Region; Peshmerga; Supported by: Netherlands	Islamic State; White Flags (2017–2018)	Ongoing as a hit-and-run campaign	2,254+	None	Fuad Masum	Haider al-Abadi
Iraqi intervention in the Syrian civil war (2017–2019)	Iraq; Syria; Russia	ISIL	Victory: ISIL loses remaining territory in Syria	None	None	Barham Salih	Adil Abdul-Mahdi

== Other armed conflicts involving Iraq ==
- Wars during Mandatory Iraq
- Smaller conflicts, revolutions, coups and periphery conflicts
  - Simele massacre 1933
  - Joint Operation Arvand 1969, Iranian show of force that Iraq did not resist
  - Kurdish rebellion of 1983 (part of Iran–Iraq War)
  - Iraqi no-fly zones conflict, 1991–2003
  - Kurdistan Islamist conflict, 2001–2004 (fought on Iraqi territory, but with no Iraqi involvement)

== Bibliography ==
- Arnold, Guy (2016). Wars in the Third World Since 1945. Bloomsbury Publishing. ISBN 978-1-4742-9101-9.
- Batatu, Hanna (2013). The Old Social Classes and the Revolutionary Movements of Iraq (3rd ed.). London: Saqi. ISBN 978-0-86356-771-1.
- Boyne, Walter J. (2002). Air Warfare: an International Encyclopedia: A-L. ABC-CLIO. ISBN 978-1-57607-345-2.
- Çoğalan, Aydın (2017). Yezidis in Syria: Identity Building and the Struggle for Recognition. Lanham: Lexington Books. ISBN 978-0-7391-7774-7.
- Colgan, Jeff D. (2013). Petro-Aggression: When Oil Causes War. Cambridge University Press. ISBN 978-1-107-31129-9.
- Colonial Office (1930). Report by His Britannic Majesty's Government to the Council of the League of Nations on the Administration of Iraq. p. 31.
- Davies, Eric (2005). Memories of State: Politics, History, and Collective Identity in Modern Iraq. Berkeley: University of California Press. ISBN 978-0-520-23546-5.
- Entessar, Nader (2010). Kurdish Politics in the Middle East. Lanham: Lexington Books. ISBN 978-0-7391-4039-0.
- Jackson, Robert (1985). The RAF in Action: From Flanders to the Falklands. Blandford Press. ISBN 978-0-7137-1419-7.
- Johnson, Rob (2010). The Iran–Iraq War. Palgrave Macmillan. ISBN 978-1-137-26778-8.
- Kadhim, Abbas (2012). Reclaiming Iraq: The 1920 Revolution and the Founding of the Modern State. University of Texas Press. ISBN 978-0-292-73924-6.
- Kahana, Ephraim; Suwaed, Muhammad (2009). The A to Z of Middle Eastern Intelligence. Scarecrow Press. ISBN 978-0-8108-7070-3.
- Kedourie, Elie (1968). "The Middle East 1900–1945". In Mowat, C. L. (ed.). The New Cambridge Modern History. Vol. XII (2nd ed.). ISBN 978-0-521-04551-3.
- Kingsbury, Damien (2021). Separatism and the State. Taylor & Francis. p. 133. ISBN 978-1-00-036870-3.
- Malovany, Pesach (2017). Wars of Modern Babylon: A History of the Iraqi Army from 1921 to 2003. University Press of Kentucky. ISBN 978-0-8131-6945-3.
- Morris, Benny (2008). 1948: The First Arab-Israeli War. New Haven: Yale University Press. ISBN 978-0-300-12696-9.
- Mughisuddin, Mohammed (1977). Conflict and cooperation in the Persian Gulf. New York: Praeger. p. 153. ISBN 978-0-03-021851-4.
- Murray, Williamson; Woods, Kevin M. (2014). The Iran–Iraq War: A Military and Strategic History. Cambridge University Press. ISBN 978-1-107-06229-0.
- O'Ballance, Edgar (1973). The Kurdish Revolt, 1961–1970. London: Faber and Faber. ISBN 978-0-571-09905-4.
- O'Ballance, Edgar (1978). No Victor, No Vanquished: The Yom Kippur War. Presidio Press. ISBN 978-0-89141-017-1.
- Oren, Michael B. (2002). Six Days of War: June 1967 and the Making of the Modern Middle East. Oxford University Press. ISBN 978-0-19-515174-9.
- Pollack, Kenneth M. (2002). Arabs at War. Lincoln, Nebraska: University of Nebraska Press. ISBN 978-0-8032-3733-9.
- Rabinovich, Abraham (2004). The Yom Kippur War: The Epic Encounter That Transformed the Middle East. New York: Schocken Books. ISBN 978-0-8052-4176-1.
- Schenker, David Kenneth (2003). Dancing with Saddam: The Strategic Tango of Jordanian–Iraqi Relations (PDF). The Washington Institute for Near East Policy / Lexington Books. ISBN 0-7391-0649-X. Archived from the original (PDF) on 23 January 2017.
- Schofield, Julian (2007). Militarization and War. New York: Palgrave Macmillan. ISBN 978-1-4039-7929-2.
- Shaery-Eisenlohr, Roschanack (2011). Shi'ite Lebanon: Transnational Religion and the Making of National Identities. Columbia University Press. ISBN 978-0-231-14427-8. Archived from the original on 27 April 2023.
- Shazly, Lieutenant General Saad el (2003). The Crossing of the Suez, Revised Edition (revised ed.). American Mideast Research. ISBN 978-0-9604562-2-2.
- Simons, Geoff; DeLoache, Judy S. (1993). Iraq: From Summer To Saddam. Springer. ISBN 978-1-349-23147-8.
- Slot, B. J. (2005). Mubarak Al-Sabah: Founder of Modern Kuwait 1896–1915. London: Arabian Publishing. ISBN 978-0-9544792-4-4.
- Sutherland, Jon; Canwell, Diane (2011). Vichy Air Force at War: The French Air Force that Fought the Allies in World War II. Barnsley: Pen & Sword Aviation. ISBN 978-1-84884-336-3.
- Terrill, W. Andrew (2004). The United States and Iraq's Shi'ite Clergy: Partners Or Adversaries?. Strategic Studies Institute, U.S. Army War College. ISBN 978-1-58487-153-8.
- Tobji, Mahjoub (2006). Les officiers de Sa Majesté: Les dérives des généraux marocains 1956–2006 (in French). Fayard. ISBN 978-2-213-63015-1.
- Tripp, Charles (2007). A History of Iraq. Cambridge University Press. ISBN 978-0-521-70247-8.
- Waters, S. D. (2008). HMNZS Leander. Wellington, New Zealand: Merriam Press. ISBN 978-1-4357-5892-6.
- Wavell, Archibald (1946). Despatch on Operations in Iraq, East Syria and Iran from 10th April, 1941 to 12th January, 1942. London: War Office. in "No. 37685". The London Gazette (Supplement). 13 August 1946. pp. 4093–4102.
- Wolf-Hunnicutt, Brandon (2011). The End of the Concessionary Regime: Oil and American Power in Iraq, 1958–1972 (Thesis). Stanford University. OCLC 712779421.
- Wolfe-Hunnicutt, Brandon (2021). The Paranoid Style in American Diplomacy: Oil and Arab Nationalism in Iraq. Stanford: Stanford University Press. ISBN 978-1-5036-1382-9.
