= List of wars involving Kurdistan Region =

This is a list of wars that Kurdish rebels and subsequently the autonomous Kurdistan Region has been involved in, since the establishment of Iraq in 1932.

Conflict	Combatant 1	Combatant 2	Results
Ahmed Barzani revolt (1931–1932)	Barzan tribe	Iraq; United Kingdom; Assyrian Levies	Iraqi victory: Revolt suppressed; Barzanis retreat to underground; Low-level insurgency continues through 1933; Another revolt by the Barzanis erupts in 1943
1943 Barzani revolt (1943–1945)	Barzani tribesmen Allied Kurdish tribes	Kingdom of Iraq	Iraqi victory: Revolt suppressed
First Iraqi–Kurdish War (1961–1970)	KDP; Supported by: Iran; Israel; United States (alleged)	Before 1968: Iraq; Syria (1963); Supported by: United States (from 1963); Egypt (1965) After 1968: Ba'athist Iraq	Military stalemate: Iraqi–Kurdish Autonomy Agreement; Arabization program continued; Second Iraqi–Kurdish War in 1974
Second Iraqi–Kurdish War (1974–1975)	KDP; Iran; Supported by: Israel	Iraq; Supported by: Soviet Union	Iraqi victory: KDP military and strategic failure; Peshmerga fighting ability destroyed; KDP–Iraq cease-fire; Failed PUK low-level insurgency; Iran withdrew its support for KDP; 1975 Algiers Agreement; Iraqi government reinstates full control over Kurdish-majority territories
1983–1986 Kurdish rebellions in Iraq (1983-1986)	KDP; Supported by: Iran PUK Kurdish mujahideen	Iraq	Short-term military stalemate: Beginning of Al-Anfal campaign (1986–89) against the Kurds and defeat of the Kurdish rebellion; Kurdish KDP, PUK, and Mujahideen temporarily hold major enclaves in North Iraq; Long term Kurdish tactical failure
Kurdistan Region–PKK conflict (1983–2025)	Kurdistan Region; (Kurdistan Region) Peshmerga; KDP; PUK (sometimes; after 1991); Supported by: Turkey; United States; Israel; Iraq; ENKS; KDP-S; Peshmerga Rojava	KCK; PKK (until 2025); HPG; YJA-STAR; YDG-H; YPS; YPS-Jin; PÇDK (until 2015); PUK (until 1991) Supported by: Iran; Hezbollah (claim Peshmerga); Ba'athist Syria (against Turkey); Ba'athist Iraq (against Turkey); Sinjar Alliance; YBŞ; YJÊ; PJAK; YRK; (Democratic Autonomous Administration of North and East Syria) DAANES; SDF; PYD	Inconclusive: Low level insurgency ended; PKK dissolves on 12 May 2025 as part of the 2025 PKK–Turkey peace process
1991 Iraqi uprisings: Battle of Sulaymaniyah; Battle of Kirkuk (1991); Battle of Tuz Khormato; Battle of Zakho	Shia and leftist elements of opposition: SCIRI/Badr Brigades; Dawa; Communist Party; (Iraq) Pro-Syrian Ba'athists; (Iraq) Army deserters/defectors; Kurdish rebels: Peshmerga: KDP; PUK; IMK; CPK; (Iraq) Jash deserters/defectors; PDKI; Diplomatic Support: United States; Military Support Iran	Ba'athist Iraq: Ba'ath Party; (Iraq) Iraqi Army; Republican Guard; Special Republican Guard; Popular Army; General Security; Intelligence Service; Special Security; Support: MEK	Iraqi government military victory: Establishment of Kurdistan Region, facilitated by the imposition of the Iraqi no-fly zones by United States, United Kingdom and France
Iraqi Kurdish Civil War (1994–1997)	KDP; Supported by: Iraq (from 1995); Turkey (from 1997); Iran (before 1995)	PUK; PKK; SCIRI; KCP; Iraqi National Congress; Supported by: Iran (from 1995) (Ba'athist Syria) Syria; United States (1996)	Washington Agreement: PKK moved to Qandil mountains from Bekaa Valley; Masoud Barzani (KDP-controlled part); Jalal Talabani (PUK-controlled part)
Kurdistan Islamist Conflict (2001–2003)	Kurdistan Region; PUK; United States (armed involvement after Viking Hammer)	Islamic Emirate of Kurdistan; Ansar al-Islam; Kurdistan Islamic Group; Kurdistan Islamic Movement; Supported by: Iran (alleged by PUK); KDP (alleged by PUK)	Kurdistan Region–United States victory: Kurdistan Regional Government regains control of the Islamic Emirate of Kurdistan
Iraq War (2003–2011)	Invasion (2003); Coalition of the willing: United States; United Kingdom; Australia; Poland; Kurdistan Region: KDP; PUK; Iraqi National Congress: Free Iraqi Forces; After invasion (2003–11); Iraq; United States; United Kingdom; MNF–I (2003–09); Kurdistan Region; Awakening Council	Invasion (2003) (Ba'athist Iraq) Republic of Iraq: MEK; After invasion (2003–11); Al-Qaeda in Iraq; Islamic Army in Iraq; Islamic State of Iraq; Mahdi Army (Ba'athist Iraq) Naqshbandi Army; Hamas of Iraq; Jaysh al-Mujahideen; 1920 Revolution Brigades; Jamaat Ansar al-Sunna	Victory: Depletion of Iraqi insurgency, improvements in public security; Re-establishment of democratic elections; U.S.-Iraq Status of Forces Agreement; See § Aftermath
War in Iraq (2013–2017)	Central government of Iraq; Iraqi Armed Forces; Iraqi Ground Forces; Iraqi Air Force; CTS-ISOF; Popular Mobilization Forces; Sunni Tribal Mobilization (since 2015); Assyrian Forces (Iraqi command); Federal Police; Kurdistan Region; Peshmerga; Zeravani; Kurdistan Region Security Council; CTG Kurdistan; Parastin u Zanyari; Assyrian Forces (Kurdish command); Allied groups: Sinjar Alliance; PKK; Rojava; Kurdish National Council; Iraqi Turkmen Front; Iraqi Communist Party; Various self-defense groups; Others: Iran; Hezbollah; Liwa Zainebiyoun; Syria CJTF–OIR; United States; United Kingdom; Canada; Australia; France; Italy; Netherlands; New Zealand; Finland; Denmark	Islamic State: Sunni insurgent factions (2013–2015); (Ba'athist Iraq) Naqshbandi Army; Army of Pride and Dignity; Hamas of Iraq; Islamic Front for the Iraqi Resistance; GMCIR (2014); Free Iraqi Army (2013–2014); Islamic Army in Iraq (2013–2014); 1920 Revolution Brigades (2013–2015); Anbar Tribal Council (2013–2015)	Iraqi and allied victory Masoud Barzani
2017 Iraqi–Kurdish conflict (2017)	(Kurdistan Region) Kurdistan Regional Government PKK; PDKI; PAK White Flags (alleged)	Iraq; Supported by: Iran	Iraqi victory: Iraqi government forces defeat the Peshmerga and capture 40% of the territory controlled by the Kurdistan Region including the province of Kirkuk, along with its oil fields and checkpoints, Khanaqin and Jalawla in Diyala province, as well as Makhmur, Bashiqa and Sinjar in Nineveh province.
