= Political Council for the Iraqi Resistance =

Political Council for the Iraqi Resistance المجلس السياسي للمقاومة العراقية
- Founded: 11 October 2007
- Military Factions: Islamic Army of Iraq; Ansar al-Sunnah; Islamic Front for the Iraqi Resistance; Hamas of Iraq; Jaish al-Mujahideen
- Ideology: Sunni Islamism; Iraqi nationalism Anti-Zionism; Salafi jihadism
- Seats in the Council of Representatives: 0 / 328
- Seats in the Governorate Councils: 0 / 601

Political Council for the Iraqi Resistance (PCIR), or the Political Council of Iraqi Resistance, is an Iraqi insurgent political coalition of six major Sunni militant groups operating inside Iraq. The formation of the umbrella organization was announced on 11 October 2007 by a group spokesman in a speech broadcast on the Arabic satellite channel Al Jazeera. The announcement was also published on several jihadist websites. The council's formation is unique in that it is one of the first times Iraq's Sunni insurgent groups have united in an attempt to form a political faction as opposed to a strictly militant one.

== Member groups ==
The Political Council for the Iraqi Resistance is made up of the three members of the previously announced Jihad and Reform Front along with two other known groups:

- Islamic Army in Iraq (IAI)
- Sharia Commission of Ansar al-Sunnah
- Islamic Front for the Iraqi Resistance (JAMI)
- Hamas of Iraq
- Jaish al-Mujahideen

The 1920 Revolution Brigades initially chose to join but reneged because they didn't want to fight other Sunni militant groups in the Anbar Province.

== Ideology ==
In its formation statement, the PCIR described itself as a "political program to liberate Iraq" and laid out a 14-point mission statement as a way of achieving its goals:

- 1. "The occupation of Iraq is injustice and aggression, not acceptable religiously and legally, resisting the occupation is legitimate by all laws."
- 2. "Armed resistance to, is the legitimate representative of Iraq, which carries a responsibility to lead the Iraqi people to achieve their hopes."
- 3. "The liberation of Iraq from foreign occupation and influence and achieve full independence, and force the occupiers compensate the Iraqi people for all the moral and material damage."
- 4. "The Mujahideen operations target the occupiers and their agents, the operations do not target innocent and the vulnerable civilians."
- 5. "We refuse any change in the population structure of the Iraqi people, and the sectarian divisions of the people, and work to defeat the sectarian-ethnic project, and preserving the unity of Iraq land and people."
- 6. "The return of the displaced to their home areas and to be compensated for their material and moral damage and protection for them."
- 7. "No legitimacy to any constitution, government or law signed under the occupation."
- 8. "The cancellation of all unfair decisions and judgments and release all prisoners and detainees."
- 9. "Non-recognition of any treaty or agreement signed during the occupation, which contrary to the rights and sovereignty of Iraq."
- 10. "The formation of a technocrats government, manages the affairs of the country during the transitional stage, this government has no right to sign any pact or contract a related to the fate of Iraq's sovereignty and wealth."
- 11. "Work on rebuilding the state of Iraq on a fair basis, that Iraq will be for all Iraqis, and to establish justice is the main goal, not accept the use of any party or authority to achieve ethnic or sectarian interests."
- 12. "Iraq is part of the Arab and Islamic nation, and work to establish the Arab Muslim identity of Iraq is the first priorities."
- 13. "The maintenance of Iraq's wealth, especially oil and water, which belongs to all Iraqis."
- 14. "Call Arabs, Muslims, peoples of the world and the international community to do their duty towards the Iraqi people to achieve the legitimate goals, and establish good relations with the world based on common interests, and dealing with the international bodies to serves the interests of Iraq and its people."
