= Islamic Army–Al-Qaeda conflict =

Part of the Iraqi civil war (2006–2008)

- Part of Iraqi Civil War
Date	Summer 2006 – 6 June 2007
Location	Iraq
Result	Ceasefire

Belligerents
Islamic Army of Iraq; Jamaat Ansar al-Sunna; 1920 Revolution Brigade; Hamas of Iraq; Islamic Front for the Iraqi Resistance; Jaish al-Mujahideen	Mujahideen Shura Council (until October, 2006); Al-Qaeda in Iraq; Jamaat Jaysh Ahl al-Sunnah wa-l-Jamaah; Jaish al-Ta'ifa al-Mansurah; Katbiyan Ansar al-Tawhid wal Sunnah; Saray al-Jihad Group; Al-Ghuraba Brigades; Al-Ahwal Brigades; Islamic State of Iraq (from October, 2006)

Commanders and leaders
Abu Al-Abed; Ishmael Jubouri; Abu Abdullah al-Shaf'i; Harith Dhahir Khamis al-Dari †	Abu Ayyub al-Masri; Abu Omar al-Baghdadi

Strength
Islamic Army in Iraq: 10,400 Ansar al-Sunnah: 500–1,000	12,000

Casualties and losses
- in total 300–1,500 deaths

The Islamic Army–Al-Qaeda conflict was part of the Iraqi civil war (2006–2008) and the Iraq War that followed the 2003 invasion of Iraq. The conflict was between Pan-Islamist, Salafi jihadist groups affiliated with Al-Qaeda, and Islamist groups made up of Iraqis which leaned more towards Iraqi nationalism and often disagreed with Al-Qaeda's ambitions.

In early 2007, one of Iraq's main armed groups had confirmed a split with al-Qaeda in Iraq (AQI), according to a spokesman for the dissenting organisation. The Islamic Army, however, reached a ceasefire with AQI on 6 June 2007, yet still "refused to sign on to" the Islamic State of Iraq.

== Background ==
The initial split between the Islamic Army and Al-Qaeda in Iraq dated back to 2005, with some small reports of splits and even armed clashes. In the summer of 2006 increasing rifts began to open between local Sunni tribes and insurgent groups (including the Islamic Army), and al-Qaeda. The main focus of these rifts was dissatisfaction with Al-Qaeda and its tactics, particularly the heavy and deliberate targeting of civilians by foreign Al-Qaeda fighters.

In September 2006, this growing anger led to the establishment of the Anbar Salvation Council by 30 tribes, who then sought US support in fighting Al-Qaeda in Anbar. Using the Al-Anbar Salvation Council as a model, CLCs were armed and trained by the U.S. military to patrol their communities and act as neighborhood watch groups. What began as the Al-Anbar Awakening [Salvation Council] later evolved into the formation of concerned local citizens' groups present in almost every major neighborhood in Baghdad and throughout the provinces.

In mid-October 2006, al-Qaeda announced the creation of Islamic State of Iraq (ISI), replacing the Mujahideen Shura Council (MSC) and its al-Qaeda in Iraq (AQI).

== Conflict ==
=== Emergence of conflict ===
Actual fighting between the various groups had begun by early 2007, with groups fighting Al-Qaeda for control of their local communities. The fighting saw Al-Qaeda targeting groups critical of it, with Al-Qaeda bombing a Sunni mosque in Fallujah in February 2007, and assassinating the leader of the 1920 Revolution Brigade.

February 2007 also saw Misha'an al-Juburi, who owns a television channel used as a propaganda channel by the IAI, attacking Al-Qaeda in Iraq, particularly over the group's attacks on civilians, rival insurgent groups, and the Iraqi security forces.

=== Al-Qaeda's conflict with the 1920 Revolution Brigades ===
The 1920 Revolution Brigades announced on 27 March 2007 that its leader, Harith Dhahir Khamis al-Dari, had been killed in an ambush by al-Qaeda in Abu Ghraib. Dari was the nephew of Harith al-Dari, the exiled head of the Muslim Scholars Association. The 1920 Revolution Brigades had allegedly been in talks over working with the Anbar Salvation Council. Dari had long been targeted by Al-Qaeda due to his refusal to pledge allegiance to the ISI Emir, Omar al-Baghdadi.

Following Dari's death the Brigades announced its split into two factions—the 1920 Revolution Brigades and Hamas of Iraq. The break was the result of differing viewpoints on working with the al-Anbar Salvation Council, negotiating with coalition forces and the relationship vis-à-vis Al-Qaeda's Islamic State of Iraq (ISI).

In January 2018, an article was published in an Arabic magazine which claimed that al-Qaeda is working with Hezbollah to target these brigades once again. There has also been talk of using them as a training ground for future jihadists.

=== Open conflict ===
Fighting magnified in the Spring of 2007. In early April the Islamic Army severed its ties with ISI after claiming that its members had been threatened by the group. Later in the month, the Islamic Army accused the ISI of killing at least 30 Islamic Army fighters, as well as members of Jamaat Ansar al-Sunna and the Mujahideen Army. In the face of escalating conflict, the Islamic Army called on Osama bin Laden to personally intervene to reign in al-Qaeda in Iraq. In May 2007 the Anbar Salvation Council claimed to have killed Abu Ayyub al-Masri, which was dispelled by an audio tape released by the group in response, which also denied claims of fighting between the various groups. In late May 2007 US forces released dozens of Iraqis who had been tortured by Al-Qaeda as part of its intimidation campaign.

By June open gun-battles between the various groups had reached Baghdad.

=== Breakdown in the ceasefire ===
Whilst the Islamic Army and Al-Qaeda had agreed on a ceasefire in June 2007, reports circulated of fighting between the Islamic Army and Al-Qaeda around Samarra in October and November 2007. Coalition forces later claimed the operations involved Iraqi and Coalition personnel, as opposed to the Islamic Army. Some news outlets at the time also reported, despite Islamic Army objections, that the Islamic Army had begun working with the Coalition as part of the wider awakening but such claims were refuted by the Islamic Army many times.
