= Islamic Resistance =

Islamic Resistance may refer to:

- Bahraini Islamic Resistance, another name for the Al-Mukhtar Brigades
- Hamas (full name Harakat al-Muqawama al-Islamiya, lit. 'Islamic Resistance Movement')
- Iraqi National Islamic Resistance, another name for 1920 Revolution Brigades
- Islamic Resistance in Iraq, umbrella group of Shia insurgents
- Islamic Resistance in Iraq (2004–2017), Sunni insurgent group, another name for the Islamic Front for the Iraqi Resistance
- Islamic Resistance in Jordan
- Islamic Resistance in Lebanon, another name for Hezbollah military wing
- Islamic Resistance Movement of Azerbaijan, another name for Husseiniyoun
- Islamic Resistance Movement of Iraq, another name for Kata'ib Hezbollah

== See also ==
- Axis of Resistance
- Resistance Front of Islamic Iran
- Islamic Army in Iraq
