= Islamic Resistance in Iraq (disambiguation) =

Islamic Resistance in Iraq is an umbrella term from 2020 onward for pro-Iran Shia Islamist insurgent groups in Iraq.

Islamic Resistance in Iraq may also refer to:

- Hamas of Iraq
- Islamic Resistance in Iraq (2004–2017)
