= Jihad and Reform Front =

Sunni insurgent coalition in Iraq (2007–2011)

- جبهة الجهاد والإصلاح
- Logo of the Jihad and Reform Front
- Dates active: 2 May 2007 - 18 December 2011
- Ideology: Sunni Islamism; Iraqi nationalism Anti-al-Qaeda
- Wars: the Iraq War

The Jihad and Reform Front (JRF), or Reformation and Jihad Front (RJF), was a Sunni insurgent coalition in Iraq that announced its formation on May 2, 2007. The announcement was posted on several jihadist websites.

The Front was opposed to and critical of Al-Qaida in Iraq, and comprises three groups: the Islamic Army in Iraq, the Mujahideen Army, and some senior leaders from the Sharia Commission of Ansar al-Sunnah, according to the Front's founding notice. Leaflets plastered on walls in the western city of Fallujah said another insurgent group, the 1920 Revolution Brigades, might have joined the front as well.

== Goals ==
According to Newsvine.com, it announced goals are as follows: "expelling the occupiers, establishing religion, government by Sharia, and a moderate approach to Islamic doctrine (i.e. against strict enforcement and Takfiri practices). It rejects the legitimacy of the constitution, 'sectarian elections', and the al-Maliki government. It calls on all factions of the Iraqi insurgency to join with it, and specifically invites the 1920 Revolution Brigade, and urges all to avoid battles at the expense of the main battle against the American occupation."

== Member Groups ==
Islamic Army in Iraq
Mujahideen Army
Sharia Commission of Ansar al-Sunnah
Army of Jihad
Army of the Tabieen
Muhammad al-Fatah Battalion
Upright Battalion
1920 Revolution Brigade
Dawa and Frontier Companies
Soldiers of the Most Merciful Companies
Jaish al-Rashideen
Army of the Muslims
Iraqi Islamic Jihad Movement
