= Bob Shepherd =

Bob Shepherd is the British author of The Circuit (ISBN 0330455737), a non-fiction account published in 2008 of the defence industry contracts spawned from the Iraq conflict.

"After nearly twenty years of SAS operations, Bob Shepherd retired from the military to work as an adviser on the international commercial security circuit -- simply referred to by its members as The Circuit. Certain his most dangerous days were behind him, Bob settled into a sedate life looking after VIPs. Then 9/11 happened."

"Written with the passion of an elite soldier, THE CIRCUIT is a pulse-racing and at times shocking first-hand testament to what is really happening on the ground, in the major trouble spots of the world."
