= Jaish al-Rashideen =

Jaish al-Rashideen Army of the Guides
- جيش الراشدين
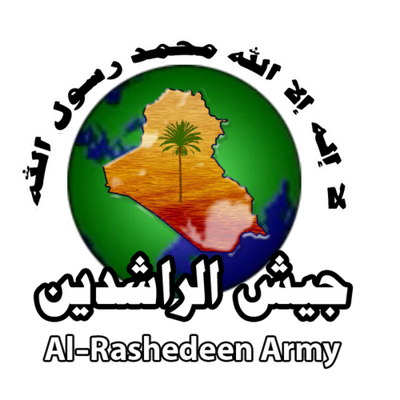
- Dates active: 2003 – 2011
- Active regions: Sunni Triangle
- Ideology: Sunni Islamism; Iraqi nationalism; Anti-Coalition
- Part of: Jihad and Reform Front
- Wars: Iraq War

The Jaish al-Rashideen (English: "Army of the Guides") group was a Sunni Iraqi insurgent group taking part in many guerrilla attacks against U.S.-led Coalition forces using IEDs, sniper fire, and firing rockets and mortar bombs. The group had been operating in Iraq since the middle of 2003. Jaish al-Rashideen conducted its attacks in the volatile Sunni Triangle, Baghdad Belts, Salah al-Din and in western Diyala. Its members are believed to be mostly native Iraqi Sunni Muslims, including persons previously serving in Saddam Hussein's national forces such as the Republican Guard, Fedayeen Saddam and the Mukhabarat.

== Overview ==
The group's goals were to end the presence of U.S. troops in the country, and the departure of all other Coalition forces in the country. The group was suspected to have joined the Mujahideen Shura Council, but so far no conclusive evidence have pointed to a connection.

On September 7, 2007, eight insurgency groups made a pact together and established a new umbrella group called Jihad and Reform Front. The groups are:

1. 1920 Revolution Brigade
2. Jaish al-Rashideen
3. Jaish al-Muslimeen
4. Islamic Movement of Iraq's Mujahideen
5. Jund al-Rahman
6. Saraya al-Dawa wa'l Ribaat
7. Empowerment Brigades
8. Battalions of Muhammad al-Fatih

Established at the first day of the occupation, and began to collect weapons from the former Iraqi Army military camps in the suburbs of Baghdad, the Army announced its existence at the same day when its fighters carried out an attack against a US occupation patrol after nine days of the occupation of Baghdad. Al-Rashideen Army battalions are located in different parts of Iraq, including the provinces of North and South.

Al-Rashideen Army claims that it does not stop with its military appearances, but go deep in understanding the occupation project, which is not aimed at Iraq alone. It thinks that the occupation program begins with the occupation of this country, and sequentially aims against Arabism and Islam everywhere. Al-Rashideen high commanders say that they are following these goals and motivations of occupation strategy and the role of the neo-conservatives and international Zionism.

Based on the previous vision, Al-Rashideen Army puts its strategic vision, and identify its options and positions in the field according to a program aimed to achieving its near and far objectives.

Al-Zubaidi (from the political office of Al-Rashedeen Army) said: "There is no doubt that Iran poses a major threat, but we believe that the danger is the first American occupation, The penetration and Iranian proliferation, happened because of the absence of American occupation and if we defeat the American occupation that would subside the Iranian threat, and if we defeat the US, we will be able to defeat all those who want to harm Iraq".

As per the Al-Rashedeen Army opinion on "Awake councils", they define them as: American made, designed and producing in Rand institutions and others. Simple groups of local paid people fulfilling the order of Americans.

The group expressed their condolences for Al-Qaeda Leader, Osama bin Laden after his death

== Al-Rashedeen Media ==
Al-Rashedeen army had special media attendance among other Iraqi resistance groups, they are identified by their unique message delivery and they explain the media block strategy that American adopt as follows:

Americans put themselves in a rather critical pit when they have decided blocking the media of the resistance in Iraq and imposing firm restrictions on Iraqi, Arabian and International press. Furthermore, they sneak to all websites belong to Iraqi resistance and shut them off. The objective of American political, as well as, military administration is to hide the voice of Iraqi resistance. Both had thought that these actions leave the space to their media and for that matter the public weather here in Iraq or on the international front will be receiving information from western or American media. Accordingly, the real situation will never be told and all the facts on the ground will be manipulated to serve the American administration.

They publish their statements, resistance operations and special releases via their two websites: www.al-rashedeen.info (in Arabic) and www.al-rashedeen.net (in English).

== Selected documentaries ==
They had released many documentaries and special releases, here listing some of them:

The Lie That Destroyed A Country

Its backdate a painful period of history of the country of letter, writing, history succession, culture Iraq which collaborated against him the Crusaders countries and their cronies from inside and outside, which they didn't come for the lie of "disarmament of weapons of mass destruction", nor for the lie of "removal of regime".

Bells of Danger

Recording a very difficult period of time, showing the difficult ordeal and divine purification for Mujaheddin (fighters). And we in Al-Rashedeen Army promise our Lord to stay in the road of Jihad, fighting our enemy, supporting our brothers in Jihad, and exposing the traitors and hypocrites for the followers of the illusory political operation, without any fear or terror.

Code of Silence

This release was oriented for western audiences with beliefs that significantly differed from the group, this made it unique compared to other Al-Rashedeen Army and Mujaheddin brother releases.

Night Friars

The night fight was having special taste, as the battleground is empty, only our fighters and our enemies as no any movement of normal people in the night, so our fighter have the freedom to move without paying attention to hitting normal people, so this was special characteristics of our fighters.
