= Shield Forces =

Shield Forces or Shield Brigade may refer to:

- Military Security Shield Forces
- Qalamoun Shield Forces
- Al-Aqsa Shield Forces, a brigade of Free Palestine Movement
- Sudan Shield Forces
- Abbas Shield Martyrdom Forces
- Libya Shield Force
- Homeland Shield Forces
- Al-Assad Shield Forces, a brigade of Military Intelligence Directorate (Syria)
- Coastal Shield Brigade
- Jaramana Shield Brigade

== See also ==
Islamic Resistance
