= Jaish al-Mujahideen =

Jaish al-Mujahideen, also spelled Jaysh al-Mujahideen (Arabic: جيش المجاهدين, meaning Army of Mujahideen), may refer to:

- Mujahideen Army (Iraq)
- Army of Mujahideen (Syria)
