= Hirak =

Hirak may refer to:

- King Hirak, a figure in Hirak Rajar Deshe
- Hirak (Algeria); another name for the 2019–2021 Algerian protests
- Hirak Rif Movement in Morocco
- Al-Hirak, Syria, town and sub-prefecture in Syria
- Popular Movement in Iraq
- Al-Hirak, Arabic name for the political movement Southern Movement in Yemen
