= Popular Movement in Iraq =

Popular Movement in Iraq الحراك الشعبي في العراق
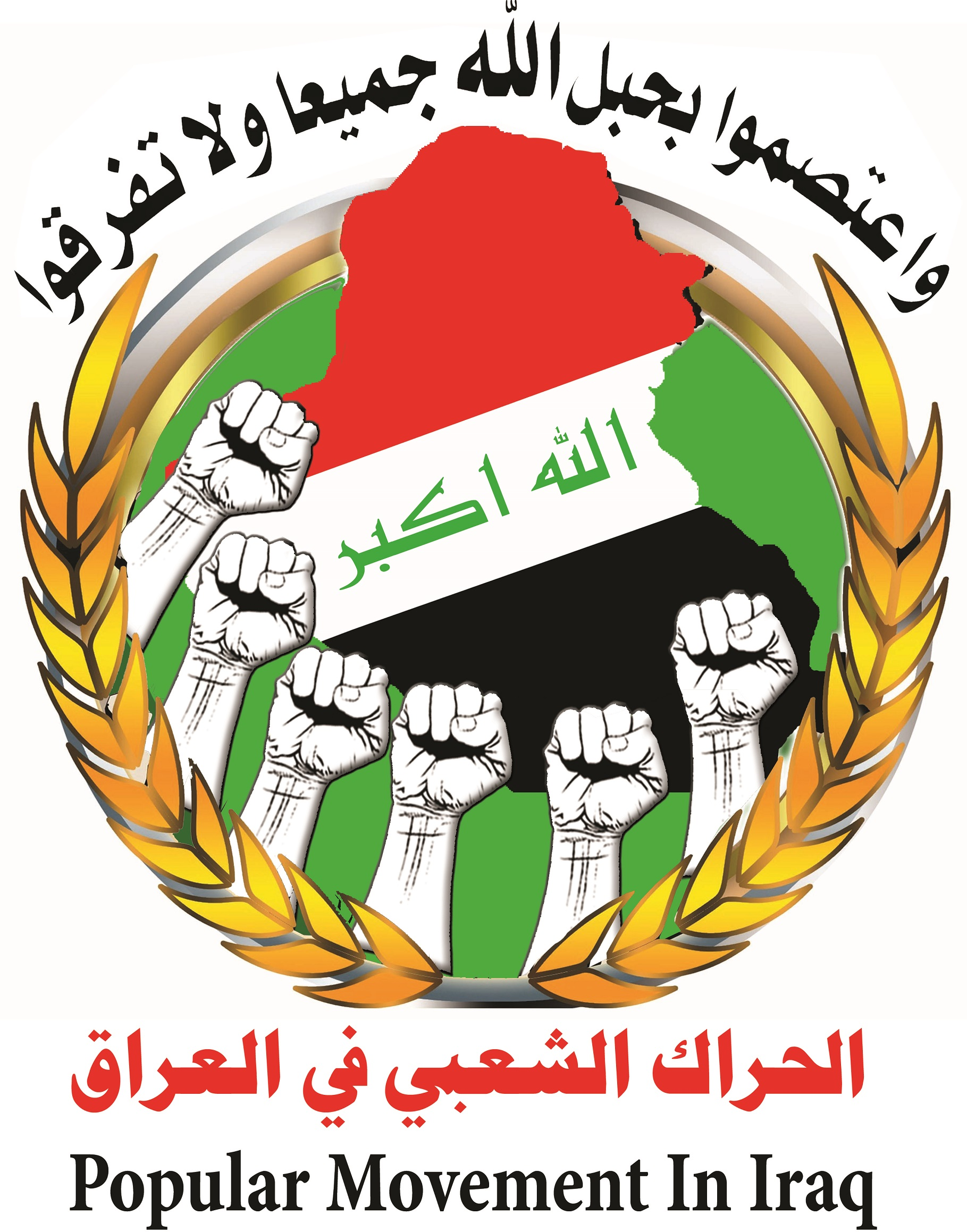
- Spokesperson: Sheikh Mohammed Taha al-Hamdoun
- Founded: 2011
- Military wing: Islamic Army in Iraq
- Ideology: Sunni interests Iraqi nationalism Federalism
- Seats in the Council of Representatives: 0 / 328
- Seats in the Governorate Councils: 0 / 601

The Popular Movement in Iraq (Arabic: الحراك الشعبي في العراق, romanized: al-Ḥirāk al-Shaʿbī fī al-ʿIrāq) is a Sunni political movement in Iraq. The spokesperson for the movement is Sheikh Mohammed Taha al-Hamdoun.

== Founding ==
The movement was founded in Samarra at the end of 2011 by the Islamic Army in Iraq, which demobilized following the US withdrawal from Iraq. The IAI had been largely weakened by individuals leaving the group and instead joining the various Sahwa militias. The groups turn away from armed opposition towards activism was criticised by other militant groups, such as Jaysh al-Mujihadeen.

== Activity ==
The movement was involved in the 2012–14 Iraqi protests, particularly in Fallujah, which was also the focus of groups such as al-Qaeda and the Ba'athist Free Iraq Intifada.

The movement is opposed to the government of Nouri al-Maliki, and fighters aligned with the movement have been active in the 2014 Northern Iraq offensive. The movement accuses the government of Nouri al-Maliki of oppressing Sunni's and aims to topple Maliki's government and replace it with a unity government. The movement has also called for a decentralized Iraq with autonomous Sunni regions. The group has also called for Sunni lawmakers to boycott a 1 July 2014 parliamentary meeting to elect a new President and Government of Iraq.

The movement is opposed to ISIS and claims that whilst ISIS has international ambitions, the Popular Movement desires only to defend the rights of Sunni's in Iraq. Hamdoun, the movement's spokesperson, has instead claimed that ISIS only constitutes 3,000 foreign fighters, or 10% of the total number of fighters opposing the Iraqi government, and is incapable of controlling Northern Iraq by itself. Hamdoun has also claimed that they will fight ISIS after the fall of the Maliki government.

=== 2014 - 2017 ===
The movement took part in the 3 year campaign against ISIS. Movement's units helped preventing ISIS from reaching Baghdad, then aided in the offensive attacks that recaptured areas in Iraq including major cities like Tikrit, Fallujah, as well as areas around Mosul. This efforts prevented Iraqi state from collapsing.

=== 2017 - present ===
After 2017, the movement became a political and security power in Iraq. The military wing was integrated into the country’s security forces whereas the political one became vital in the politics of Iraq. Based on analysis after 2021, the movement and its fractions continued to play a major role in local politics, increasing it parliamentary representation and gaining control over ministries, budgets and sections of the economy. During 2022 the movement was involved in armed confrontations in Baghdad, following the disputed elections.
