= Hidden Camera Jihad =

Hidden Camera Jihad also known as Jihad Hidden Camera is a propaganda film widely available on the internet. The film features clips of American & British soldiers being killed by IEDs and snipers and is overdubbed with slapstick style sound effects and an applause/laugh track.

It is often aired on Al-Zawraa TV, a TV channel that frequently airs footage of attacks on coalition forces.

In an interview with NPR Phil Alden Robinson (director of Sneakers and Field of Dreams) said he suspects the film is of American origin due to a number of pop culture references (including Tarzan and Fox News) and the software used to manufacture the film.
