= Al-Zawraa TV =

Al-Zawraa TV logo

Al-Zawraa TV (Arabic: قناة الزوراء ) was a 24-hour Iraqi satellite television channel that was known for airing graphic videos of insurgent attacks on US-led Coalition forces accompanied by melodramatic Saddam-era martial music, and running commentary by camouflage-clad anchors. According to Iraqi officials, Al-Zawraa is a mouthpiece for the Islamic Army in Iraq, a Ba'athist-dominated insurgent group. The station was owned by Misha'an al-Juburi. Al-Zawraa was also known for airing anti-Shia propaganda, portraying Iraqi Shiites as "Iranian stooges". On 9 January 2008, the U.S. Treasury Department sanctioned Al-Zawraa television station for “broadcasting graphic videos of insurgent attacks against U.S. forces and advocating violence against Shia.”

In January 2007, the station was noted broadcasting on the Eutelsat-owned Eurobird satellite and on the Arabsat/Badr satellite, both at the 26 degrees east orbital position. The Eurobird outlet was closed after only a few days' operation. The station's transmission was closed on the Nilesat 101 satellite in February 2007 for "interference with other channels". It became available again on the 7W position via Atlantic Bird 4.

== Programming ==
Typical programming for the channel included footage of American troops being picked off by insurgent snipers, blown up by roadside bombs and targeted by missiles. In many cases, these videos appear with patriotic, or anti-US style songs in the background, with the network asking viewers to comment on these videos by e-mail.

Other programmes have included commentaries against the U.S. invasion of Iraq, and, for a short time, news bulletins read by presenters wearing Ba'ath Party army fatigues.

The station was known to show Hidden Camera Jihad, a video compilation of insurgent operations against U.S. forces with slapstick-style soundtrack and video effects.

The programmes were in Arabic, with occasional English subtitles.

== Closure ==
The station appeared to close down in July 2007 after its transmissions via the Arabsat satellite were jammed. It is now banned in Iraq.
