= United Jihad Factions Council =

The United Jihad Factions Council is a confederation of Iraqi Sunni insurgent groups, including the Islamic Army and Hamas of Iraq, that now cooperate with the U.S. Army and the Iraqi Army.

The group fought alongside coalition forces during the Battle of Baqubah.

== Sources ==
Anderson, John Ward (20 June 2007). "Dozens of Insurgents Killed in Iraq Offensive"; Washington Post. Retrieved 19 August 2007.
