= Al-Rafidain TV =

Al-Rafidain TV قناة الرافدين
- Broadcast area: MENA

Programming
- Language: Arabic

Links
- Website: alrafidain.tv

Al-Rafidain TV (Arabic:قناة الرافدين) is an Iraq-based Arabic television channel broadcasting from Istanbul, Turkey where its headquarters is located. Launched on 10 April 2006 on Nilesat, the channel is owned by Sunni Arabs and has an anti-Western agenda and supporting Association of Muslim Scholars.
