= General Military Council for Iraqi Revolutionaries =

Iraqi Ba'athist militant group formed in 2014

- المجلس العسكري العام لثوار العراق
- Official logo (top) and flag (bottom) of General Military Council for Iraqi Revolutionaries
- Dates active: 15 January 2014 – 2 December 2014
- Active regions: Iraq
- Ideology: Iraqi nationalism Ba'athism; Saddamism
- Size: 75,000

The General Military Council for Iraqi Revolutionaries (Arabic: المجلس العسكري العام لثوار العراق al-Majlis al-‘Askari al-‘Āmm li-Thuwwār al-‘Irāq; GMCIR), was a Ba'athist militant group and Sunni insurgent coalition in Iraq headed by Saddam Hussein-era military and political leaders. It was described by Al Jazeera as "one of the main groups" in the Iraqi insurgency.

GMCIR began its insurgency against the Iraqi government in January 2014, during the War in Iraq (2013-17), as a unifying command for the former Sunni Arab Spring protesters that Nouri al-Maliki's government had cracked down upon since 2012. The figures associated with the GMCIR stated that it hads a central command and "the footprints of a professional army", that it followed the Geneva Convention protocol rules, as well as claiming to be non-sectarian and seeking a "democratic solution" to the Iraqi crisis. The GMCIR announced its opposition to Iranian influence in Iraq and the role the IRGC played with Iraqi security forces.

The Carnegie Endowment for International Peace characterized the GMCIR as an Arab Socialist Ba'ath Party – Iraq Region front group.

By the end of 2014 the group was eclipsed by ISIL and had become defunct.

== Presence in Iraq ==
The MCIR had a presence in Al Anbar Governorate (especially Ramadi and Fallujah), Saladin, Baghdad, Abu Ghraib, Mosul, and Diyala. After seizing and capturing Mosul, the MCIR entered it along with many opposition armed forces, including ISIL. They installed a former officer in the Iraqi Army, Major General Azhar al-Ubaidi, with the approval of the other forces that entered Mosul, as governor. A municipal worker described MCIR as administering the management of the city better than the Iraqi government, which was "providing electricity for only 2 or 3 hours a day," and was "corrupt."

After the Iraqi Parliament approved the government of the new PM Haider al-Abadi on 8 September 2014, the MCIR stated on 9 September "Our people are being deceived, misled, ignored and mocked, while the political process stayed on the same faces." They commented in the statement on the installation of Nouri al-Maliki as a vice-president of Fuad Masum, saying "Instead of prosecuting al-Maliki for his crimes and his explosive barrels that are being thrown on the heads of innocent people, the political leaders of Iraq honored him by making him vice-president of the republic of murder and destruction."

== Relationships with other groups ==
=== Association of Muslim Scholars ===
The GMIR had close links with the Association of Muslim Scholars, a group that considered the current Iraqi government as illegitimate due to being the result of the United States occupation.

=== ISIL ===
The MCIR's relationship with the Islamic State in Iraq and the Levant was one of cooperation, yet there were significant differences between the two. Despite taking part in the same June 2014 offensive, which wrested control of much of Northern Iraq from Baghdad, MCIR spokesman and former General Muzhir al Qaisi criticized ISIL and their strict implementation of Shari'a law, describing members of ISIL as "barbarians." He also claimed that the MCIR was stronger than ISIL.

An unnamed source for the MCIR stated: "We plan to avoid them [ISIS] until we are settled and operations are finished; then we will kick them out."

The presence of MCIR fighters on the ground was noted by observers, who argued that United States airstrikes would "inflame" the situation in Iraq by not taking into account the diversity of the opposition to the al-Maliki regime.

=== Kurdish Region ===
The MCIR reportedly had a truce agreement with the Kurdistan Region not to target Kurdish territory, in return for the Regional Government's non-interference in the Council creating an autonomous area outside of the control of the current Iraqi government.

List of sunni insurgent group in the coalition:

(Ba'athist Iraq) Naqshbandi Army (until 2015)

Anbar Tribal Council (2013–2015)

Islamic Army in Iraq (2013–2014)

Free Iraqi Army (2013–2014)

other sunni insurgents (2013-2015)

== Media ==
Iraqi TV coverage of early 2014 events within the country was split along sectarian, religious lines. Channels loyal to Prime Minister Nouri Maliki, including the government's own al-Iraqiya TV, rallied Iraqis to volunteer and fight to restore order and remove "terrorists". Meanwhile, Sunni channels presented the latest advances by the insurgents as part of an uprising against what they called "al-Maliki's army."

According to western media, Al-Rafidain TV was particularly supportive of the cause of the "revolutionaries" and "mujahideen" who it said were fighting to liberate the country.

== See also ==
- List of armed groups in the Iraqi Civil War
