= Christian militias in Iraq and Syria =

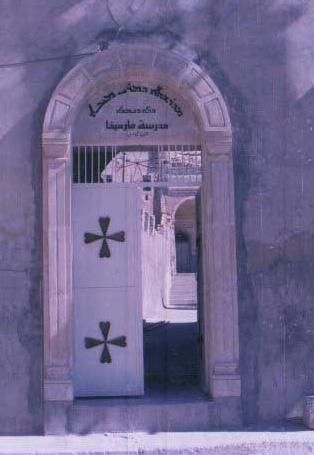
An Assyrian Christian church in Alqosh, Tel Keppe District, Iraq, 2006

Due to the Syrian Civil War and the War in Iraq (2013–2017), many Christian militias in Iraq and Syria have been formed. Although they are primarily composed of ethnic Assyrians, they also include Arab and Armenian irregulars from the same countries. Assyrians in Iraq have formed militias in the north to protect Assyrian communities, towns and villages in the Assyrian homeland and Nineveh Plains. Some foreign Christian fighters from the Western world have also joined these militias.

Following the spillover of the Syrian Civil War, and the rise of the Islamist militant groups, many Christian civilians fled, in particular in fear of Islamic State of Iraq and the Levant (ISIL), who have violently persecuted Christians in the areas that have come under their control. Some of those that have stayed formed militias, largely to protect their own populations from ISIL and other hardline Syrian rebel Islamist groups such as al-Qaeda's Nusra Front, Ahrar al-Sham, and Jund al-Aqsa. While initially forming to protect their own territory, some of the larger militias have gone on the offensive.

Before the war, as much as 10% of the population in Syria was Assyrian, Armenian, or Arab Christian, who made up one of the largest Christian minorities in the Middle East. In the early days of the civil war, some Christian communities were given arms by both the Syrian government and Kurdish groups, to defend themselves against sectarian Sunni Islamist Syrian rebels. The Syriac Military Council, a Syriac-Assyrian Christian militia allied with the Kurdish-majority People's Protection Units (YPG), is the largest Christian militia in the Syrian civil war. By comparison with some of the other armed groups in Syria, Christian militias are small, and dependent on the Syrian government or the Autonomous Administration of North and East Syria. Defense units set up under the auspices of the Ba'athist Syrian government were called Popular Committees, which were then integrated into the National Defense Forces. After the fall of the Assad regime, these units disbanded.

== Syria ==
=== Syrian Democratic Forces ===
The following militias are part of the Syrian Democratic Forces of the Autonomous Administration of North and East Syria.

==== Syriac Military Council ====
The Syriac Military Council (Syriac abbreviation: MFS) is largely composed of Assyrian and some Armenian Christians, with its headquarters in al-Malikiyah. Based in the Jazira Region, it is the main armed Christian militia in the Autonomous Administration of North and East Syria. The group is allied with the mainly-Kurdish People's Protection Units (YPG) and has more than 2,000 members. In 2013, the militia confronted, with its allies, the al-Nusra Front in Tell Hamis, during the Al-Hasakah Governorate campaign (2012–2013), and finally regained the town during the Eastern al-Hasakah offensive in late February 2015. Later that year, the MSF defended the Christian villages of the Khabur valley from Islamic State of Iraq and the Levant attacks. They were also involved in the 2015 Al-Hasakah city offensive, successfully capturing the town from the Islamic State, in conjunction with the YPG. The group is armed mainly with light and some medium weapons, and some armoured vehicles, and has appealed to the West for heavier weapons. The West presently only sends weapons to other rebel groups, but has so far not offered any aid, with the militia sourcing most of its low-level weapons locally. In October 2015, the Syriac Military Council was one of the founding components of the Syrian Democratic Forces.

===== Bethnahrain Women's Protection Forces =====
The Bethnahrain Women's Protection Forces is a small female-only subunit of the MFS, the formation of which was influenced by the Women's Protection Units.

==== Martyr Nubar Ozanyan Brigade ====
On April 24, 2019, the "Martyr Nubar Ozanyan Brigade" was formed as an Armenian brigade of the Syrian Democratic Forces on the anniversary of the Armenian genocide in the Marziya Church in Tell Goran.

==== Khabour Guards ====
The Khabour Guards (Syriac: ܡܘܬܒܐ ܕܢܛܘܪ̈ܐ ܕܚܒܘܪ, romanized: Mawtḇā d-Nāṭorē d-Ḥābor; Arabic: مجلس حرس الخابور الآشوري) is an Assyrian Syrian militia created after the collapse of Syrian government control in the Assyrian-majority Khabur valley northwest of al-Hasakah Governorate. The militia is composed of locals and maintains checkpoints in several Assyrian villages, most notably Tel Tamer. Though officially neutral and nonpartisan, the Khabour Guards are de facto affiliated with the Assyrian Democratic Party along with Nattoreh.

==== Nattoreh ====
The Assyrian People's Guard – Nattoreh (Syriac: ܢܛܘܪ̈ܐ ܕܬܠ ܬܡܪ ܐܫܘܪܝܐ, romanized: Naṭore d'Tel Tamer Ashoraye; Arabic: اللجنه الشعبيه للحرس الأشوري) is an Assyrian Syrian militia based in the Khabur valley town of Tell Tamer northwest of Al-Hasakah, an area with a large Assyrian population. The militia is composed of local Assyrians and is along with the Khabour Guards affiliated with the Assyrian Democratic Party.

==== Sutoro ====
Sutoro which is also known as the Syriac Security Office or the Sutoro Police, is an ethnic Assyrian, Syriac-Christian police force in Jazira Canton of the Federation of Northern Syria – Rojava in Syria, where it works in concert with the general Kurdish Asayish police force of the canton with the mission to police ethnic Assyrian areas and neighbourhoods. It is based around the city of Qamishli and has around 1,200 fighters, and arms checkpoints in Assyrian populated parts of cities, together with Assyrian towns and villages such as Tell Tamer.

=== Assad government ===
The following militias were aligned with the military of Syria, loyal to Ba'athist Syria under Bashar al-Assad.

==== Gozarto Protection Force ====
This is a largely Syriac-Assyrian militia based in Qamishli, in Syria's north-east. It is allied with the Syrian government, and fights in conjunction with the Syrian Army. It has been active in the defense of the majority Christian town of Sadad from Islamic State of Iraq and the Levant. The militia has 500 fighters.

==== Guardians of the Dawn ====
The Guardians of the Dawn are a coalition of Syrian Christian pro-government militias from southern Syria.

==== Sootoro ====
The Sootoro is another Assyrian militia based only in the city of Qamishli, in North Eastern Syria. It is aligned with the Syrian regime, and has clashed not only with ISIL, but with the YPG and Sutoro, which it accuses of trying to appropriate Assyrian lands.

== Iraq ==
=== Nineveh Plain Protection Units ===
The Nineveh Plain Protection Units (Classical Syriac: ܚܕܝ̈ܘܬ ܣܬܪܐ ܕܫܛܚܐ ܕܢܝܢܘܐ Ḥḏāywāṯ Settārā da-Šṭāḥā d-Nīnwē) or NPU is an Assyrian military organization that was formed late in 2014, largely but not exclusively by Assyrians in Iraq to defend themselves against Islamic State. The Nineveh Plains is a region where Assyrians in Iraq have traditionally been concentrated. The Assyrian Security force Nineveh Plain Protection Units currently run the security in many Towns and Villages in the Nineveh Plains

The Assyrian Policy Institute reports that the NPU has 2,000 men registered to be trained awaiting approval and funding from the Federal government of Iraq and that they currently have 600 active soldiers deployed and running the security in towns such as Bakhdida, Karamlesh and partly in Bartella where the security is contested by PMF Brigade 30 or known as the Shabak Militia with the support of the Badr Organization leaving the NPU outnumbered.

=== The Nineveh Plain Guard Forces (NPGF) ===
The Nineveh Plain Guard Forces also known as Christian Peshmerga is composed of former members of the Church Guards that were forced to disband and disarm in 2014 as Kurdish officials began confiscating weapons that belonged to local Assyrians prior to the ISIS invasion that left the Assyrians defenceless.

It's estimated that they currently have 1,500 Assyrian soldiers under Peshmerga command

=== Dwekh Nawsha ===
Dwekh Nawsha is an Assyrian Christian militia defending the Christian cities in the Nineveh province of Iraq. A number of foreign Western Christian fighters have joined the militia in order aid in the effort.

A report by the Assyrian Policy Institute released in June 2020 claimed that Dwekh Nawsha was eventually disbanded and that all of its social media accounts have been deleted.

=== Nineveh Plain Forces ===
The Nineveh Plain Forces (Syriac: ܚܝ̈ܠܘܬܐ ܕܕܫܬܐ ܕܢܝܢܘܐ, romanized: Ḥaylawotho d'Deshto d'Ninwe) or NPF is a military organization that was formed on 6 January 2015 by indigenous Assyrian Christians in Iraq, in cooperation with Peshmerga, to defend against Islamic State of Iraq and the Levant.

A 2020 Report by the Assyrian Policy Institute claimed that the NPF was disbanded in 2017 following the unsuccessful Kurdistan Region independence referendum.

=== Babylon Brigade ===
The Babylon Brigade is a nominally Christian militia that was formed as part of Iraq's Popular Mobilization Forces by Rayan al-Kildani, a Chaldean Catholic Assyrian with close ties to the Badr Organization. It has been criticized as "pseudo-Christian" for being led by a Christian but having a mostly Shia and Shabak composition, and for attempting to take over areas controlled by the NPU.

=== Kataib Rouh Allah Issa Ibn Miriam ===
Kataib Rouh Allah Issa Ibn Miriam (Arabic: كتائب روح الله عيسى بن مريم; lit. The Brigade of the Spirit of God Jesus Son of Mary) was an Assyrian Christian militia formed by Salwan Momika after an agreement with the Kata'ib al-Imam Ali subgroup of the Popular Mobilization Forces. The formation of the militia was an opportunistic move by Sheykh Sheykh Shibl al-Zaidi, head of the Imam-Ali brigades, to capitalize off of the dissatisfaction of Nineveh's Christians with Kurdish forces, who faced accusations of leaving minorities vulnerable to ISIS.

Author Carl Drott estimates that the militia had 30 Assyrian members in 2015, but it is not known to what extent the group was involved in combat. By the second half of 2015, the militia had gradually dissolved.

== See also ==
- Christianity in Iraq
- Christianity in Syria
- Proposals for Assyrian autonomy in Iraq

== Bibliography ==
- Drott, Carl (2021). Minority politics by other means: Assyrian militias in Iraq 2014–2017 (PhD thesis). University of Oxford.
- Rashid, Bedir Mulla (2018) [2017]. Military and Security Structures of the Autonomous Administration in Syria. Translated by Obaida Hitto. Istanbul: Omran for Strategic Studies. Archived from the original on 2018-07-01.
- Rudolf, Inna (7 April 2026). Iraq's Shi'a Warriors: From Battlefield to Parliament. Manchester University Press. ISBN 9781526193056.
