= Tribal Mobilization =

Anti-ISIL faction in Iraq

- الحشد العشائري
- Founder: Thamer Al-Tamimi
- Dates active: 2015-present
- Country: Iraq
- Size: 25,000 (2025)
- Part of: Popular Mobilization Forces (de jure)

Tribal Mobilization (Arabic: الحشد العشائري) is a group of former sunni tribesmen and insurgents in Iraq that was formed to combat the Islamic State (IS). In 2017, Thamer Al-Tamimi, the Deputy Chief of the Sunni Tribal Mobilization, publicly expressed a growing sense of disillusionment among Sunni leaders in Iraq. In an interview with Al-Hadath TV, Al-Tamimi stated that relying on support from Arab states would not be beneficial to Iraqi Sunnis. He accused some of these states of using Iraqi Sunnis as part of their regional competition with Iran. Al-Tamimi also mentioned that the Tribal Mobilization had sought assistance from Gulf countries in their fight against IS, but according to him, these requests went unanswered.

== Structure ==
- Anbar Region: Numerous, smaller units, typically consisting of 100-200 men, with larger forces like the 51st Brigade (linked to local tribal leaders and operating in Salah ad-Din) functioning on the ground.
- 1-54th Brigade: Based in Amiriyat Al-Fallujah and Al-Karma, under the Anbar Operations Command.
- 2-55th Brigade: Stationed in Husaybah, west of Anbar, under the Anbar Operations Command.
- 3-57th Brigade: Stationed in Haditha District, commanded by Major General Faisal Hussein Al-Jughaifi.
- Nineveh Guard: Formerly known as Nineveh National Mobilization, associated with Atheel al-Nujaifi.
- Tribal Mobilization (General): Known as Hashd al-Ashair, often receiving salaries via the Iraqi government, with many units receiving training and light weapons through U.S.-supported initiatives.
