= Iraqi Special Republican Guard =

1992–2003 elite branch of Iraq's Republican Guard

- الحرس الجمهوري الخاص
- Republican Guard Forces Command insignia
- Founded: 1992/1995
- Disbanded: April 2003 (de facto); 23 May 2003 (de jure)
- Country: Ba'athist Iraq
- Allegiance: Saddam Hussein
- Branch: ISOF
- Type: Praetorian Guard
- Size: 12,000 (2003)
- Part of: Iraqi Special Security Organization
- Garrison/HQ: Al-Harthiya Garrison, Baghdad 33°18′35″N 44°21′33″E
- Color of beret: Maroon
- Engagements: Iraq War: 2003 invasion of Iraq

The Iraqi Special Republican Guard (SRG) (Arabic: الحرس الجمهوري الخاص, romanized: al-Ḥaras al-ʿIrāq al-Jamhūrīy al-Khas), also known as the Special Forces Brigade of the Presidential Palace, Republican Guard Special Protection Forces, or the Golden Division, was an elite praetorian guard unit founded in either early 1992 or March 1995 in Ba'athist-era Iraq. The Special Republican Guard was controlled by the Special Security Organization and tasked with protecting President Saddam Hussein, presidential sites, Baghdad, and responding to any rebellion, coup, or other threats to his power.

== History ==
The Special Republican Guard (SRG) was established in 1981 as the Quwwat al-Tawari' (The Emergency Forces). In 1985-86, it was expanded and renamed the SRG. In order to prevent a coup d'état, Saddam Hussein forbade the Special Republican Guard (SRG) from coordinating with other forces, even the regular Republican Guard or any other units were ever allowed near the SRG.

The Special Republican Guard received better pay and benefits than members of the normal Republican Guard and the regular Iraqi Army. By 2002, there were reportedly 12,000 members of the SRG, drawn primarily from clans loyal to Saddam Hussein and his regime. As many as five brigades containing 14 battalions of 1,300–1,500 men each, and also included air defense, armored, and artillery were reported to be in existence at that time. In May 2003, the SRG was officially dissolved per Order 2 of the Coalition Provisional Authority under Administrator L. Paul Bremer, in the wake of the invasion of Iraq by a U.S.-led international coalition.

Former members of the Special Republican Guard were later suspected of carrying out insurgent attacks on Coalition forces in Iraq after the invasion, while others went on to join Sons of Iraq home guard militias, funded, trained, equipped and operated by American forces.

== Structure ==
The SRG had 13 or 14 battalions and ranged in troop strength from 15,000 to 26,000. This may have fallen to only 12,000 by 2002.

- 1st Brigade
- 2nd Brigade
- 3rd Brigade
- 4th Brigade
- Air Defense Command
- Tank Command
