= Free Iraqi Army =

Iraqi Sunni rebel group

- الجيش العراقي الحر
- The 1963-1991 flag of Iraq, used by the FIA
- Dates active: 19 July 2012–1 August 2014
- Allegiance: Ba'athist Iraq
- Active regions: Iraq: Al Anbar Governorate; Nineveh Governorate
- Size: 2,500+
- Wars: the Syrian Civil War and the Iraqi insurgency
- Website: https://www.facebook.com/freeiraqiarmypage

The Free Iraqi Army (FIA; Arabic: الجيش العراقي الحر, romanized: Al-Jayš Al-‘Irāqī Al-Ḥurr) was an Iraqi rebel group formed in the western Sunni-majority provinces of Iraq from Iraqi supporters of the Free Syrian Army rebels fighting in the Syrian Civil War. The group aimed to overthrow the Shia-dominated government of Iraq, believing that they would gain support in this from Syria should the rebels be successful in overthrowing Bashar al-Assad. An Iraqi counterterror spokesman denied this, saying that the name is merely being used by al-Qaeda in Iraq to "attract the support of the Iraqi Sunnis by making use of the strife going on in Syria."

Aside Anbar Province, the FIA reportedly had a presence in Fallujah, along the Syrian border near the town of Al-Qaim, and in Mosul in the north of Iraq. A recruiting commander for the group told a reporter from The Daily Star newspaper in Lebanon that the group was opposed to both Al-Qaeda in Iraq and their opponents in the Sahwa militia. The same commander claimed that the group received financial support from cross-border tribal extensions and Sunni sympathizers in the Persian gulf states of Qatar, Saudi Arabia, and the UAE.

On 4 February 2013, Wathiq al-Batat of the Shiite militant group Hezbollah in Iraq, announced the formation of the Mukhtar Army to fight against al-Qaeda and the Free Iraqi Army. In August 2014, the group became defunct, after a large offensive by ISIL in northern Iraq, with activity on their websites ceasing.

== Links to al-Qaeda and the Iraqi Ba'athists ==
Despite the group's denial of links to al-Qaeda, the group had been accused of being affiliated with the group. These accusations of links with both al-Qaeda and the Ba'athists led to a Najaf Shiite figure associated with the State of Law Coalition issuing a fatwa against supplying the group with weapons.

== See also ==
- List of armed groups in the Iraqi Civil War
