= Mujahideen Army (Iraq) =

Sunni militant group (2004–2011)

Army of the Holy Warrior Jaysh al-Mujahideen
- جيش المجاهدين
- Leader: Abu Jandal al-Shamri
- Dates active: 2004 – 2015
- Dissolved: 2015
- Ideology: Jihadism; Sunni Islamism; Iraqi nationalism Anti-Zionism
- Part of: Jihad and Reform Front; Political Council for the Iraqi Resistance
- Wars: the Iraq War

The Mujahideen Army (Arabic:جيش المجاهدين; lit. Army of the Holy Warrior) was a Sunni militant group in Iraq. The group first emerged in late 2004. The Mujahideen Army is one of the founding members of the Jihad and Reform Front as well as a member of the Political Council for the Iraqi Resistance (PCIR). The Mujahideen Army is comprised almost exclusively of native Iraqi Sunni Muslims from tribal areas, including ex-members of Saddam Hussein's military and security agencies such as Fedayeen Saddam, Special Republican Guard, Republican Guard and the Special Security Organization.

== Ideology ==
Religious in the nature, the Mujahideen Army takes on a more nationalist tone in its rhetoric. The militant group is believed to have an ideology similar to that of fellow Iraqi insurgent group, the Islamic Army in Iraq (IAI).

In May 2006 the Mujahideen Army released a statement condemning Iraq's ethnic and sectarian infighting and urged Iraqis to work "with a sense of national and religious responsibility for the sake of future generations."

In late January 2006, the Mujahideen Army issued a communiqué calling for attacks against Denmark and Norway, in response to the publication of cartoons depicting the Islamic prophet Muhammad in several Danish newspapers.

They also threatened attacks following controversial comments made by Pope Benedict XVI in September 2006. They announced their intention to "destroy their cross in the heart of Rome… and to hit the Vatican."

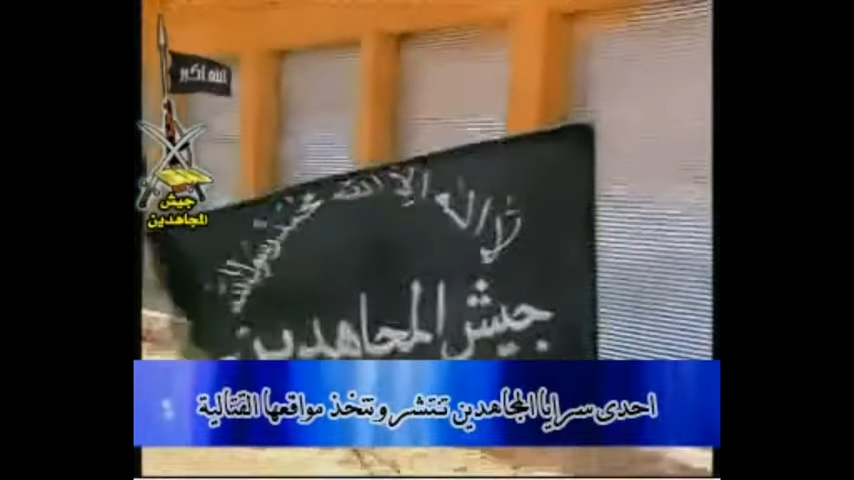
The flag of the Army of the Holy Warrior, or Mujahideen Army. Located on "The Battle of the Drawn Sword" published by the Mujahideen army on 11:35.

The Mujahideen Army have also taken the unique step of appealing directly to the American public via several English-language videos purportedly produced and distributed by the group.

== Attacks ==
The Mujahideen Army has taken credit for numerous attacks against American forces in Iraq. The majority of these claims are issued in communiqués or videos posted on mujahideen websites.

Some notable attacks in which the Mujahideen Army has claimed responsibility:

- The January 2007 downing of a Black Hawk helicopter north of Baghdad.
- Shooting down an American Apache helicopter in January 2006.

== Leadership ==
Little is publicly known about the Mujahideen Army's leadership and command structure.

In October 2005, the U.S. military announced that it had captured Ahmad Ni'mah Khudayyir Abbas (a.k.a. Abu Shihab), a group "lieutenant and propaganda chief" in the Abu Ghraib district west of Baghdad.

In a January 2006 statement urging the Mujahideen Army to join the then-fledgling Mujahideen Shura Council, al-Qaida in Iraq identified the emir of the Mujahideen Army as "The Leaping Lion."

American intelligence analyst Malcolm Nance claims that Mujahideen Army of Iraq was a liaison between former Baath militias like the Fedayeen Saddam and the Islamists. However, most Mujahideen Army commanders appear to be former regime soldiers who were anti-Baathist politically and became Islamist mujahideens after they left army service following the 2003 U.S. invasion. Mujahideen Army spokespeople like Abdul-Rahman Qaisi and Abdullah Umari have been critical of the Baath party and want to turn Iraq into an Islamic emirate free of control from foreign occupation.
