= Hamas of Iraq =

Former Sunni Armed Group in Iraq

- حماس العراق
- Emblem of Hamas of Iraq
- Spokesperson: Ahmed Saeed Al-Hamed
- Founded: 2007
- Dates active: 18 March 2007 – 7 November 2014
- Dissolved: 2015
- Split from: 1920 Revolution Brigades
- Active regions: Baghdad Governorate; Diyala Governorate; Al Anbar Governorate; Saladin Governorate
- Ideology: Iraqi nationalism Sunni Islamism
- Part of: Political Council for the Iraqi Resistance
- Wars: Iraq War; Iraqi insurgency (2003–2011); Islamic Army–Al-Qaeda conflict

Hamas of Iraq (Arabic: حماس العراق, romanized: Ḥamās al-'Irāq) was a Sunni militia group based in Iraq, which split from the 1920 Revolution Brigades on 18 March 2007. On 11 October 2007, the militia group joined a political council that embraced armed insurgency against American forces.

== Name ==
Contrary to popular belief, the group, despite its name, is not related to the Palestinian militant group called Hamas. In an interview between Hamas of Iraq and As-Sabeel, the group explained that the name was chosen due to inspiration of the "Jihad in Palestine", but they also explained that there is no formal coordination or any organizational relationships between the two.

== Political program ==
Hamas in Iraq released a political program in April 2007 with some of the following provisions:

- "The movement believes in armed jihad as a means for expelling the occupier, and calls on public opinion and agencies and international institutions to respect this right... of all peoples to resist occupation, and to distinguish between that and armed crimes which target innocent civilians."
- "We believe in a necessary link between military efforts and political action as two mutually supportive instruments for achieving the goals of resistance for liberation and salvation and preventing the fundamentalist movements from harvesting the fruits of the resistance."
- "We confirm the necessity of continuing the killing until the exit of the last soldier from the occupying armies, and to not negotiate with the enemy except with an agreement of the factions of the jihad and the Iraqi resistance; and under the appropriate circumstances and conditions."

In July 2007, The Guardian reported that the group participated with other insurgent groups in an alliance called the Political Council for the Iraqi Resistance, which includes a range of Islamist and nationalist-leaning groups which was formed to negotiate with the Americans in anticipation of an early US withdrawal. Main planks of the joint political program included "a commitment to free Iraq from foreign troops, rejection of cooperation with parties involved in political institutions set up under the occupation and a declaration that decisions and agreements made by the US occupation and Iraqi government are null and void."

== Operations in Diyala in August 2007 ==
The 1920 Revolution Brigades insists that Hamas in Iraq was involved in assisting US troops in their recent Diyala operations against Al-Qaeda in Iraq in August 2007. The insistence occurred when The Washington Post reported in a telephone interview with Lt. Col. Joseph Davidson, executive officer of the 2nd Infantry Division, U.S. forces were now "partnering with Sunni insurgents from the 1920 Revolution Brigades, which includes former members of ousted president Saddam Hussein's disbanded army." The 1920 Revolution Brigades replied that: "We say to ... the occupation and to your followers and agents that you made a very big lie" in linking us with the Diyala anti-Al-Qaeda campaign. The group maintains that the US military spokesman should have referred to "Iraqi Hamas", which consisted of Brigades before the operations.

As for Hamas of Iraq, they denied allegations of cooperating with America to fight Al-Qaeda, as said in an interview. They also claimed that "the occupying forces were unable to enter areas and villages in Diyala until Al-Qaeda paved the way for them by killing Sunni civilians and destroying their homes, mosques, and hospitals." Allegedly, they did fight Al-Qaeda in Diyala, but not with America.

For Hamas of Iraq, Al-Qaeda is not a resistance movement, since it has its own agenda that "extends beyond Iraq, which became clear when Abu Musab Al-Zarqawi pledged allegiance to Osama bin Laden."

In a statement from the commander of Hamas of Iraq in the Diyala Governorate, he said that the resistance factions have tried to talk with Al-Qaeda in order to stop the criminal acts of Al-Qaeda so that harm against civilians may be stopped. However, the efforts failed and ended in "treachery and lack of commitment from Al-Qaeda." Apparently, the leader of Ansar al-Islam should have been the mediator for dialogue with Al-Qaeda from the very beginning, but Al-Qaeda refused.

== Military wing (Al-Fath Al-Islam Brigades) ==
=== Brigades ===
The group announced that these brigades of the military will be responsible for the following regions:

Baghdad Governorate:

1. Special Baghdad Brigade
2. Al-Fath Al-Mubin Brigade
3. Abdallah Azam Brigade
4. Nahawand Brigade
5. Al-Muthanna bin Haritha Al-Shabina Brigade

Diyala Governorate:

1. Sa'd bin Mu'adh Brigade
2. Sa'd bin Al-Rabi' Brigade
3. Sa'd bin Abada Brigade
4. Zubair Al-Awam Brigade
5. Na'man bin Al-Muqrin Brigade
6. Khadifa bin Al-Yaman
7. Othman bin Afan Brigade
8. Al'ala bin Al-Hadharmi Brigade
9. Al-Ahrar Brigade
10. Al-Mustafa Brigade
11. Omar bin Abd Al-Aziz Brigade
12. Izz Al-Din Al-Qassam Brigade
13. Abdallah bin Mas'ud Brigade
14. Ali bin Abi Talib Brigade
15. Khaled bin Al-Walid Brigade
16. Al-Karar Brigade

Al-Anbar Governorate:

1. Al-Fallujah Brigade
2. Al-Hamadin Brigade
3. Ahmad bin Hanbal Brigade
4. Ahmad Yassin Brigade
5. Mahmoud Sheit Khattab Brigade
6. the Al-Firdaws Brigade
7. Al-Aqsa Brigade
8. Abu Basir Brigade
9. Salah Al-Din Al-Ayyubi Brigade
10. Omar bin Al-Khattab Brigade
11. Abdallah bin Al-Mubarak Brigade
12. Abd Al-Aziz Al-Rantisi
13. Abd Al-Rahman Brigade
14. Al-Khadhra Brigade

Saladin Governorate:

1. Abu Bakr Al-Sadiq Brigade
2. Al-Farouq Brigade
3. Special Brigade
4. Hamza bin Abd Al-Mutallib Brigade
5. Abd Al-Rahman Al-Dakhil Brigade
6. Al-Hassan bin Ali Brigade

Northern Sector:

1. Muhammad Al-Fatih Brigade
2. Nur Al-Din Zanki Brigade
3. Sayf Allah Brigade

== See also ==
- List of armed groups in the Iraqi Civil War
- United Jihad Factions Council
- 1920 Revolution Brigades
