= Islamic Front for the Iraqi Resistance =

Former Sunni Muslim insurgent group in Iraq

Islamic Front for the Iraqi Resistance al-Jabha el-Islamiya lil-Moqawama al-Iraqiya
- الجبهة الإسلامية للمقاومة العراقية - جامع
- Logo of JAMI
- Dates active: May 2004 – 18 December 2011
- Ideology: Sunni Islamism; Iraqi nationalism
- Political position: Right-wing
- Part of: Muslim Brotherhood in Iraq
- Wars: Iraq War

The Islamic Front for the Iraqi Resistance (Arabic: الجبهة الإسلامية للمقاومة العراقية - جامع, romanized: al-Jabha el-Islamiya lil-Moqawama al-Iraqiya, JAMI), also known as the Islamic Resistance in Iraq (Arabic: المقاومة الإسلامية في العراق, romanized: al-Moqawamat al-Islamiat fi al-Iraq), was a Sunni Islamist insurgent group in Iraq that fought the U.S.-led Coalition as a part of the Iraqi Insurgency. The group announced itself around May 2004. The nationalist group has affirmed several times that it only focuses on fighting U.S. forces, not Iraqis. It is believed that JAMI has affiliations with the former Iraqi Republican Guard and that some of the JAMI members might be ex-members of the Republican Guard. JAMI's field of operations stretched from Baghdad to Anbar Governorate, Saladin Governorate and Diyala Governorate.

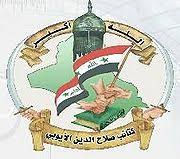
The Islamic Front for the Iraqi Resistance's armed wing "Salah Al-Din al-Ayyubi Brigades"

The group was believed to be of Muslim Brotherhood background, similar to the 1920 Revolution Brigades.

The group has been reported and promoted several times by Al Jazeera English, claiming that the militants have "Master's degree in media", and that it only attacks US forces, not Iraqis.
