= Islamic Army in Iraq =

Iraqi underground Islamist militant organization

Islamic Army in Iraq الجيش الإسلامي في العراق
- Leaders: Ishmael Jubouri; Muhammad Abid Luhaibi; Ahmed al-Dabash
- Dates active: 2003–2015
- Active regions: Sunni Triangle; Baghdad Belts
- Ideology: Sunni Islamism; Iraqi nationalism Anti-imperialism; Anti-Zionism
- Size: 10,400 (2007)

The Islamic Army in Iraq (Arabic: الجيش الإسلامي في العراق, romanized: al-Jayšu l-ʾIslāmiyyu fī l-ʿIrāq, abbr. IAI) is an underground Islamist militant organization formed in Iraq following the 2003 invasion of Iraq by U.S.-led Coalition forces, and the subsequent collapse of the Ba'athist regime headed by Saddam Hussein. IAI was regarded as one of the largest, most sophisticated and most influential Sunni insurgent groups in Iraq that led an asymmetrical military insurgency against Coalition forces. The group, made up largely of former Baathists, became known for its grisly videos of kidnappings and attacks on U.S. forces.

Although it carries an Islamic title, the group combines Sunni Islamism with Iraqi nationalism, and has been labelled as "resistance" by Iraq's Sunni Vice president Tariq al-Hashimi (who was sentenced to death in 2012) despite al-Hashimi's close relations with the U.S. government.

Following the withdrawal of American forces from Iraq in late 2011, the IAI largely demobilized and turned towards political activism, setting up the Sunni Popular Movement. The group’s turn away from armed opposition towards activism was criticised by other militant groups, including groups that the IAI had previously allied with such as the Mujahideen Army.

In the beginning of 2014, however, the group returned to armed militancy and was active anti-government violence in Anbar and Northern Iraq during the first phases of the War in Iraq (2013-17). The group was primarily active in the Diyala and Saladin Governorates. Most of its fighters have renounced fighting against the Iraqi state, although some have joined Islamic State. Islamic Army in Iraq has not claimed any attacks since late 2014.

== Roots and ideology ==
The precise details about the emergence of the IAI are unclear, although it is generally assumed that the group was established in the late summer of 2003 to fight and expel Coalition forces from Iraq. Former officers of Saddam Hussein's army from Sunni strongholds such as Ramadi, Fallujah, Tikrit and tribal areas who were skilled ex-soldiers from the disbanded Republican Guard, Fedayeen Saddam, and the Iraqi Intelligence Service formed and joined the Islamic Army in Iraq (IAI).

When the IAI first formed, it used kidnapping as a means of pursuing its goals. The group also threatened to target the January 2005 elections, although it didn't carry out any such attack. Unlike most terrorist organizations today, the IAI does not have Salafist tendencies, its primary focus and goal being the expulsion of foreign troops from Iraq. A November 2004 Washington Post interview with the group's leader, Ishmael Jubouri, stated that the IAI was predominantly composed of Iraqis (Sunnis, Shias, Kurds, and Arabs) trying to force foreign troops out of Iraq. The Terrorism Monitor put out by The Jamestown Foundation confirms some of what Jubouri was claiming. In a March 2005 article, the monitor said the group was composed primarily of Sunnis with a small Shiite congregation and, in general, was "[an] inclusive Islamic organization with Iraqi nationalist tendencies."

In a November 2006 Al Jazeera interview, spokesman Ibrahim al-Shamary expanded on who the IAI considers foreign troops, "There are two occupations in Iraq. Iran on one side through the militias which they control and through direct involvement with the national guard and the intelligence services, that causes the killing and destruction of the Sunnis. ... And then there is the American occupation which destroys the Iraqi people."

The group has released several joint statements with other groups such as Islamic Resistance Movement and the Islamic Front for the Iraqi Resistance, which are known to be of an ikhwan background. In one of these joint statements, six groups (including the IAI) called for Iraqis to participate in the referendum on the October 2005 constitution by voting against it. (This was in conspicuous contrast to al-Qaeda in Iraq, which said that simply participating in voting is a compromise of the fundamentals of Islam, even if one were to vote against it.)

When rumours spread in Iraq of the alleged demolition of the al-Aqsa Mosque, in April 2005, the IAI announced the formation of the "al-Aqsa Support Division." This group was to support Palestine in the armed struggle against Israel. The current status of the al-Aqsa Support Division is unknown, leading people to believe that the statement was merely rhetoric.

The group has shown support for the Free Syrian Army (FSA) and its fight against the Syrian government and allied Shiite paramilitary groups like Hezbollah. In June 2013, the IAI released a statement advising the FSA in methods in fighting.

== Foreign hostages ==
The group was responsible for the abduction of the following people who were released unharmed:

- Fereidoun Jahani; Iranian Consul.
- Georges Malbrunot (41) and Christian Chesnot (37); French journalists.
- Marwan Ibrahim al-Kassar and Mohammed Jawdat Hussein; Lebanese electrical workers.
- Angelo dela Cruz; Filipino truck driver.
- Rosidah Anom and Rafikan Binti Amin; female Indonesian nationals.

The IAI is also believed responsible for the execution of the following foreigners:

- Enzo Baldoni; Italian journalist killed on or about August 26, 2004.
- Raja Azad (49), engineer, and Sajad Naeem (29), his driver; Pakistani nationals working in Iraq for a Kuwaiti-based firm killed on or about July 28, 2004.
- Dalibor Lazarevski, Dragan Marković, and Zoran Naskovski; nationals of Republic of Macedonia, working for United Arab Emirates-based Soufan Engineering on contracts and subcontracts for the U.S. military and its private contractors. The three were seized in August 2004 and the Macedonian government confirmed their execution by October 21, 2004; receipt of videos depicting two beheadings were announced, but not broadcast, on al-Jazeera TV on October 17, 2004.
- Ronald Schulz; American contract electrician, killed around December 8, 2005.

== Other activities ==
On 22 November 2003, the Islamic Army in Iraq organized and videotaped a shoulder-fired surface-to-air missile attack on a DHL Airbus A300 leaving from Baghdad International Airport.

On 27 October 2004, the Islamic Army in Iraq claimed responsibility for the assassination of Qussay Mehdi, a senior Iraqi diplomat, in Baghdad.

On 15 April 2004, the Islamic Army in Iraq assassinated Khalil Naimi, first secretary of the Iranian Embassy in Baghdad. Naimi was accused of being a senior Iranian intelligence officer in charge of collecting information on the Iraqi "resistance".

The Islamic Army in Iraq claimed responsibility for the 1 September 2004, assassination attempt against Iraqi politician Ahmed Chalabi, leader of the Iraqi National Congress, in which two of his bodyguards were killed, two were wounded and two went missing (the IAI admitted capturing one of Chalabi's bodyguards and executing the other), and Chalabi escaped unharmed.

On 24 March 2005, the IAI claimed responsibility for a vehicle-borne improvised explosive device (VBIED) that detonated at a city entrance checkpoint in Ramadi. The attack killed 11 Iraqi police commandos and wounded 2 U.S. Marines and 2 Iraqi civilians.

On 22 April 2005, the IAI released a video of their members executing Lyubomir Kostov, a Bulgarian civilian contractor, who survived after the downing of his helicopter. He was helped to his feet and then shot with 27 rounds of ammunition. The group also claims to have shot down a commercial airliner in Iraq, although officials maintain the accident was caused by fog. The crash killed 34 people.

In 2006, videos were released of their snipers killing Coalition forces. The alleged name of the IAI sniper is "Juba". These sniper videos were distributed for free to Iraqi citizens on CDs as part of a propaganda, recruiting campaign and as a means of waging psychological warfare on Coalition forces. Islamic Army videos of attacks on U.S.-led Coalition forces were aired on Al-Zawraa TV channel, which is now banned in Iraq.

On 20 January 2007, the Islamic Army in Iraq claimed responsibility for shooting down U.S. military helicopter northeast of Baghdad, killing all 13 service members aboard.

As of 2011, the group's content was distributed online by the Jihad Media Battalion (subtitled in English) and the Media Division of the Islamic Army in Iraq (subtitled in Arabic). These groups were considered distinct from al-Qaeda and the linked groups As-Sahab, Ansar ul-Mujahideen, and al-Fida Islamic Network and also distinct from the Global Islamic Media Front, Islamic Media Center, and the media center of the Islamic Jihad Army.

In the beginning of 2014, however, the group was active in the anti-government violence in Anbar and Northern Iraq and after the outbreak of the War in Iraq (2013-17). Most of its fighters have renounced fighting against the Iraqi state, although some have joined ISIS. Islamic Army in Iraq has not claimed any attacks since late 2014.

== War with al-Qaeda in Iraq ==
In early 2007, the Islamic Army engaged in an armed conflict against Al-Qaeda in Iraq. In June, this ended in a ceasefire between the two rival groups. The IAI was quoted saying "The most important thing is that it's our common duty to fight the Americans;" nevertheless, the groups never adopted al-Qaeda's philosophy and refused to sign on to the al-Qaeda-led Islamic State of Iraq.

According to Iraqi sources, fighters from the Islamic Army battled Al-Qaeda gunmen around Samarra at least twice in October and November 2007, a possible indication that the cease-fire brokered earlier this year had collapsed (however, coalition officials later issued a statement claiming that Iraqi policemen and coalition troops, not Islamic Army fighters, had carried out the latter operation). Furthermore, although the Islamic Army denied that it had joined forces with the U.S. military, several news outlets reported that many Islamic Army commanders in and around Baghdad were now working together with the U.S.-led coalition to counter Al-Qaeda in Iraq.

== See also ==
- List of armed groups in the Iraqi Civil War
- Ansar al-Islam
- Jamaat Ansar al-Sunna
- United Jihad Factions Council
- Iraqi insurgency (2003–2011)
- Al-Zawraa TV
