= 1920 Revolution Brigades =

Sunni armed group in Iraq

- كتائب ثورة العشرين
- 1920 Revolution Brigade emblem
- Leader: Harith Zahir Khamis al-Dhari †(2003–2005)
- Dates active: June 2003–2015
- Headquarters: Al Anbar Province
- Active regions: Al Anbar Province
- Ideology: Iraqi nationalism Sunni Islamism
- Size: 3000+ (2010); Aswad Kamil Al-Falahi †(2005–2007); Abdalah al-Ani
- Wars: Iraq War; Iraqi insurgency (2003-2011); Anbar campaign (2003–2011); First Battle of Fallujah; Battle of Najaf (2004); Second Battle of Fallujah; Iraqi civil war (2006–2008); Islamic Army–Al-Qaeda conflict; War in Iraq (2013-2017)

The 1920 Revolution Brigades (Arabic: كتائب ثورة العشرين, romanized: Kitā'ib Thawrat al-ʿIshrīn') was a Sunni militant and insurgent group in Iraq, formed by former members of the disbanded Saddam-era Iraqi military, following the 2003 American invasion of Iraq. The group had used improvised explosive devices, and armed attacks against U.S.-led Coalition forces and comprises the military wing of the Islamic Resistance Movement. The group was named in reference to the Iraqi revolt of 1920.

== Allegiances ==
A U.S. military spokesman states that the "concerned local nationals" group is now aligned with U.S. forces, while the Brigades denied this in a posting on its web site: "We say to... the occupation and to your followers and agents that you made a very big lie" in linking the group with the Diyala anti-al Qaeda campaign. The group maintains that the "Iraqi Hamas" organization, which consisted of members who left the Brigades before the Diyala operation, were the ones involved in the operation. Iraqi Prime Minister Nouri al-Maliki has feared such U.S.-armed 'concerned local citizens' are an armed Sunni opposition in the making, and has argued that such groups should be under the command of the Iraqi Army or police.

== Activities ==
The 1920 Revolution Brigades describes its aim as to establish a liberated and independent Iraqi state on an Islamic basis. It has been active in the Sunni area west of Baghdad, in the regions of Abu Ghraib, Khan Dari and Fallujah and in the governorates of Nineveh, Diyala and al-Anbar. The name of the group (lit. 'Brigades of the Revolution of the Twenty') refers to the Iraqi revolt of 1920 against the British, drawing an implicit parallel between the nationalist movement against Britain with the Iraqi guerrillas fighting against coalition forces in the 21st century. They are the military wing of the Islamic Resistance Movement. The logo of the group is a map of Iraq, with a Quran on top of it, and the verse "Help from Allah, and an imminent victory". In the middle there is a mirrored symbol of an AK-47, with an Iraqi flag attached to it. Between the gun and the flag, a small print says "Islamic Resistance movement", and below, a larger print reads "Brigades of the 20th Revolution."

== History ==
Former emblems of the 1920 Revolution Brigade, showing the growing Islamic influences over time.

The Brigade first emerged in a 16 July statement in which it claimed that U.S. forces were sustaining higher casualties than were being reported. Since then, it resurfaced periodically, including in graffiti in such insurgent strongholds as Fallujah. This group appears to concentrate on guerilla activity, rather than terrorism, and is sensitive to the opinions of the established Sunni Muslim clergy in Iraq (in contrast to groups such as Jama't al-Tawhid wal-Jihad). High-profile operations include the kidnapping of American citizen Dean Sadek in November 2004 and the bombing of the al-Arabiya television network headquarters in Baghdad in October 2005. It has also shot down several American helicopters in the Fallujah region.

Little is known about the group's leadership. On 2 January 2005, the Ministry of Defence (Iraq) reported that Iraqi security forces arrested Hatim al-Zawba'i, whom they identified as a commander of the 1920 Revolution Brigades. In a statement issued on 13 February 2006, the group vowed to "carry on jihad until the liberation and victory or [until they are] martyred.
In 2014, after the rise of ISIL in Iraq, the brigades of the 1920 revolution They clarified that they are not allies of the Islamic State, but that if the Iranian intervention in Iraq killed Sunni Muslim civilians, they would respond with attacks.

== Organization split ==
In March 2007 some of its members broke off from the 1920 Revolution Brigades to form Hamas of Iraq. In a statement issued on 18 March 2007, the 1920 Revolution Brigades stated that it had dissolved into two new brigades, Islamic Conquest and Islamic Jihad. Islamic Conquest became Hamas of Iraq and is the name chosen for its military wing. Islamic Jihad took over the name Twentieth Revolution Brigades, promising to uphold its jihadi inheritance.

== Relationships with others ==
The 1920 Revolution Brigades has used bombings, kidnappings, and armed attacks against U.S. forces but does not target non-Muslims or Shiites, staying out of the sectarian war. As a result, it has developed a growing rift with Al-Qaeda in Iraq, which has used suicide bombings to often target Shiite civilians which they regard as infidels. The 1920 Revolution Brigade turned down an offer to pledge allegiance to an insurgent coalition group, the Mujahideen Shura Council (MSC), established by the Jihad Base Organization in Mesopotamia.

On 27 March 2007, the leader of the 1920 Revolution Brigade, Harith Dhahir Khamis al-Dari (nephew of the most prominent Sunni Iraqi cleric, Haith al-Dari) was killed in an ambush by the Islamic State of Iraq. Intermittent gun battles have taken place between fighters of the 1920 Revolution Brigades and the Islamic State of Iraq, and rumors have circulated of negotiations between members of the group and the Iraqi government and U.S. forces.

Although the group has used bombings, kidnappings, and armed attacks against U.S. forces, on 20 June 2007, The Washington Post reported that, per telephone interview with Lt. Col. Joseph Davidson, executive officer of the 2nd Infantry Division, U.S. forces were now "partnering with Sunni insurgents from the 1920 Revolution Brigades, which includes former members of ousted president Saddam Hussein's disbanded army." The group has since replied that: "We say to ... the occupation and to your followers and agents that you made a very big lie" in linking us with the Diyala anti-al-Qaeda campaign. The group maintains that the organization to which the US military spokesman referred had become the "Iraqi Hamas" organization, which consisted of members who left before the Diyala operation and were no longer associated with the 1920 Brigades.

In October 2007, The Guardian reported that the 1920 Revolution Brigades would not join an alliance of six other Iraqi insurgent groups. The six groups listed a 14-point political program, including a call for continued action against US forces and a declaration that all laws passed by the Iraqi government were null and void. A spokesman for the brigades said it did not join because it did not want to fight with those Sunni tribal groups working with the US against al-Qaeda. The spokesman also denied an Economist report that the 1920 Revolution Brigades was working with Americans, and insisted the group was still attacking Americans.

== See also ==
- List of armed groups in the Iraqi Civil War
- Iraqi insurgency (2003–2011)
