= Battle of Najaf (2003) =

Battle of the Iraq War

Coordinates: 32.0000°N 44.3333°E

- Part of 2003 invasion of Iraq
- Destroyed Iraqi Asad Babil tank on Highway 9 outside Najaf
Date	24 March – 4 April 2003 (1 week and 4 days)
Location	Najaf, Iraq
Result	Coalition victory

Belligerents
United States; United Kingdom	Iraq

Commanders and leaders
(United States) William S. Wallace (United States) David Petraeus (United Kingdom) Brian Burridge	(Iraq) Mizban Khadr al-Hadi

Units involved
United States Armed Forces; United States Army; 1st Armored Division; 3rd Infantry Division; 101st Airborne Division; United States Air Force; British Armed Forces; Royal Air Force	(Iraq) Iraqi Armed Forces; (Iraq) Iraqi Army; Fedayeen Saddam; Republican Guard; Baath Party militia; (Iraq) Al-Quds militia

Casualties and losses
4 killed 2 captured 2 M1 Abrams tanks destroyed 1 M2 Bradley destroyed 1 AH-64 Apache shot down 29 AH-64 Apaches damaged	590–780 killed 100 vehicles destroyed

The Battle of Najaf was a major battle in the 2003 U.S. invasion of Iraq. The first stage of the battle was fought when the U.S. 3rd Infantry Division fought to surround the town. The second stage was fought when soldiers from the U.S. 101st Airborne Division fought to clear and secure the city.

== Background ==
The city of Najaf sits astride important highways leading north to Karbala and Baghdad. Rather than simply bypassing the town as had been done with Nasiriyah and Samawah, the 3rd ID decided to isolate the town to prevent it from being used to stage attacks on American supply lines. The plan was to seize the major bridges in Al Kifl, a town north of Najaf, and Abu Sukhayr, a town south of Najaf. The northern bridge at Al Kifl was codenamed Objective Jenkins and the southern bridge in Abu Sukhayr was codenamed Objective Floyd.

Before the attack started, heavy sand storms in the area grounded all the Army's helicopters, denying air support to the American forces.

ODA 0544 of Bravo Company, 2nd Battalion 5th SFG was infiltrated onto the Wadi al Khirr Airfield by MC-130 and drove 80 km to Najaf, on arrival it began setting up vehicle checkpoints to gather local intelligence. Previously ODA 572 had driven into the city after being given the wrong grid reference, but quickly withdrew under Iraqi mortar fire.

== Apache attack on 24 March ==
On 24 March 32 AH-64D Longbow Apache attack helicopters of the 11th Aviation Regiment were tasked with carrying out a long range penetration mission against armored forces belonging to the Iraqi Republican Guard's Medina Division which was positioned outside Najaf. Rather than provide close air support near the front lines, the helicopters were going to be used in a manner similar to strike aircraft.

It is believed that Iraqi observers had the 11th AvR's forward assembly areas under observation. Regardless, when the helicopter forces of 1-227 AVN and 6-6 CAV approached Najaf that night, the city's power grid was shut down for several seconds as a signal that the helicopters were approaching. Heavy anti-aircraft and small arms fire targeted the helicopters. Every single helicopter on the mission was hit and one even survived a direct hit from a rocket-propelled grenade. The flight turned back towards base, with some of the helicopters on fire and others running on one engine or shot full of holes. One Apache was brought down and crash-landed in a marsh. Combat search-and-rescue aircraft were unable to reach the crash site due to the heavy antiaircraft fire. The two crew, CWO Ronald Young Jr. and CWO David Williams, attempted to evade Iraqi forces by swimming down a canal. After swimming a quarter mile, they left the canal and tried to make a break across open ground towards a treeline. However, they were spotted in the bright moonlight by armed civilians and surrendered after being fired upon. They were handed over to Iraqi forces and would eventually be rescued in mid-April near Tikrit. The Iraqi government would show the helicopter on TV and claim that the helicopter had been shot down by a farmer with a BRNO bolt-action rifle, however due to the high volume of anti-aircraft fire and the armor of the Apache it is unlike that a single rifle could bring down an Apache. The downed helicopter was later destroyed by firing two MGM-140 ATACMS surface-to-surface missiles at it from long range to prevent its equipment being used by the Iraqis.

The failed attack would cause much controversy, with some arguing that the mission showed the Apache was ineffective at long range strikes due to lack of stealth and high vulnerability to ground fire due to lack of adequate armor, and that it should be limited to close air support missions. Others argued that the failure of the 24 March mission was due to poor planning and breaches of operational security rather than any defect in the Apache itself. On 26 March, the AH-64A Apache attack helicopters of 2-6 CAV attempted another long range strike, however this strike was co-ordinated with a pre-mission artillery barrage as well as co-operation with F/A-18 Hornet strike aircraft. Also, Apaches never stopped to hover and instead fired on the move. These tactics led to the destruction of 7 anti-aircraft guns, 5 radars, 3 artillery pieces and 25 other vehicles versus no Apaches lost.

== Objective Jenkins ==
The job of capturing Objective Jenkins in Al Kifl was given to the 1st Brigade Combat Team headed by Col. Will Grimsley. However, at the time of the order 1st BCT was strung out between Nasiriyah and Najaf. The only available unit to attack Objective Jenkins was the brigade's air defense battery, equipped with M6 Bradley Linebacker armored vehicles, along with a reconnaissance unit and forward air controllers. At 1:00 am on 25 March, the air defense unit attacked towards the bridge and ran into heavy fighting against entrenched Iraqi Fedayeen Saddam paramilitary forces. Fighting throughout the night, the men made slow progress, calling in artillery strikes on the entrenched Iraqis. Before dawn, the air defense troops called for reinforcements and Col. Grimsley called LTC Rock Marcone to send in Bravo Company 3rd battalion 7th Infantry Regiment. Upon linking up at 8:30 am, the air defense troops were sent to guard the flanks while B co. 3/7 Inf continued the attack towards the bridge, fighting against Iraqi foot soldiers and using infantry to clear buildings along the road.

At 11:00 am, B Co. 3/7 Inf attacked the bridge. After 3 tanks had driven on to the bridge, Iraqi sappers detonated explosives that had been wired onto the bridge. The bridge failed to collapse, but it was damaged, trapping three M1 Abrams tanks on the far side of the bridge. After inspecting the bridge and deciding it could hold a tank, LTC Rock Marcone the Battalion Commander of Task Force 3/69 AR ground guided his personal tank across the bridge. The bridge held and in an act of individual heroism, he walked across the center of the bridge in plain view of the enemy and under direct small arms and mortar fire. He linked up with the cut off tanks and then sent the rest of the American armored force across the bridge, engaging Iraqi troops on the other side in vicious close quarters fighting. The troops came under fire from Iraqi mortars and were under near-suicidal attack from Iraqi forces who would charge their positions in pickup trucks, cars, dump trucks. 3 Bradley Fighting vehicles were hit by RPGs. These attacks continued all day on 26 March, but they failed to dislodge the American forces from the bridge. Bravo Company 3/7 INF stayed at Object Jenkins until relieved by 3/7 cav on the afternoon of 27 March. Bravo Company 3/7 Infantry was engaged in ground combat with Iraqi forces from a total of 36 hours and faced up to 1200 Iraqi paramilitary forces. The capture of Objective Jenkins isolated Najaf from the north.

== Objective Floyd ==
At 6:00 am on 25 March, the 3rd Squadron, 7th Cavalry Regiment attacked Objective Floyd. Fighting took place in a sandstorm which reduced visibility to 25 meters, causing the Americans to rely on thermal imaging to target Iraqi troops. At 10:43 am the bridge was reached and was found to not be wired for detonation. After crossing the bridge, the 7th Cavalry sent Troops A and B north to secure a dam and bridge and set up blocking positions to further isolate Najaf. This group came under attack by hundreds of Iraqi paramilitaries who snuck up at close quarters during the sandstorm.

At the same time, Troop C securing the bridge around Objective Floyd came under heavy attack by Iraqi forces charging their positions in civilian vehicles, even going so far as to ram an M3 Bradley with a city bus and crashing a loaded fuel tanker through the American lines. Although helicopters were still grounded due to the sand storm, aircraft could fly above the sand and deliver GPS-guided munitions. Several airstrikes by Rockwell B-1B Lancer bombers destroyed two Iraqi T-72 tanks.

While Troop B was moving northwards it was ambushed by Iraqi forces at close range. During this engagement, two M1 Abrams tanks and one M3 Bradley AFV were knocked out and their ammunition ignited. However the blast panels worked as they were designed and no crewmen were killed. Initial reports indicated that the tanks had been hit by Russian-made 9M133 Kornet antitank missiles, however, no evidence that the Iraqis possessed Kornets was ever found, and it is now thought that the tanks were disabled by hits from a RPG-18.

Troop B abandoned the tanks and reached their blocking positions as nightfall put an end to the Iraqi attacks.

== Surrounding Najaf ==
After nightfall on 26 March, 1st Battalion, 64th Armored Regiment attacked south from Objective Jenkins in an attempt to link up with the 7th Cavalry Regiment at Objective Floyd and thereby complete the encirclement of Najaf. That night they successfully linked up with the 7th Cavalry. On 27 March, 7th Cavalry withdrew after 120 hours of continuous combat.

Inside Najaf, the situation was becoming increasingly desperate. Civilians who had made their way to American lines reported that the Saddam Fedayeen militia were forcing members of the Al-Quds Militia to fight by threatening to kill their entire families. They also reported that the local Ba'ath Party leader had been executing civilians before being killed in an airstrike. An Iraqi Army colonel reported that of the 1,200 men under his command, only 200 were left.

On 29 March, four American soldiers from the Alpha Company 2nd Battalion 7th Infantry Regiment, 3rd Infantry Division were killed when a suicide bomber attacked their checkpoint northwest of Najaf.

== Taking Najaf ==
Due to continued attacks on supply lines by Iraqi forces operating out of bypassed cities, American forces slowed their advance for several days in order to secure their supply areas for the final push on Baghdad. During this time, the 82nd Airborne Division was attacking Samawah. On 28 March, the 101st Airborne Division, supported by 2nd Battalion, 70th Armored from the 1st Armored Division relieved the 3rd ID units around Najaf.

On 29 March, the 101st attacked Iraqi forces positioned in an agricultural college in the southern part of the city. They also captured Najaf's airfield. On March 30, ODA 544 linked up with the 101st Airborne and entered the city. On 31 March, the 101st launched a reconnaissance-in-force into Najaf, in the area of the Imam Ali Mosque. The men came under attack by infantry, RPGs and howitzers being fired at point-blank range. In a four-hour fight, heavy air support was used against the Iraqi forces, however the mosque was spared damage.

On 1 April, the 101st commanders deliberately did not attack a single road leading out of Najaf towards Hillah. When Iraqi forces tried to flee along this road, they were ambushed by OH-58 Kiowa helicopter gunships and were targeted by snipers.

Also on 1 April, elements of the 70th Armored Regiment launched a "Thunder Run", an armored thrust through Najaf's city center. M1 Abrams tanks were used and the attack met heavy resistance but was successful.

On 2 April, the 101st launched several coordinated attacks into Najaf, seizing Saddam Fedayeen strong points and capturing much equipment. By 4 April, the entire city was in American hands.
