= Fedayeen Saddam =

Ba'athist Iraqi paramilitary organization

- فدائيي صدام
- Fedayeen Saddam shoulder sleeve insignia
- Founded: 1995
- Disbanded: April 2003 (de facto); 23 May 2003 (de jure)
- Country: Ba'athist Iraq
- Allegiance: Saddam Hussein
- Branch: Paramilitary militia
- Type: Light infantry, guerrilla, presidential guard, militia
- Role: Internal security, last line of defense
- Size: 30,000–40,000 members
- Garrison/HQ: Tikrit; Kadhimiya; Samarra; Fallujah; Nasiriyah
- Patron: Saddam Hussein
- Mottos: "Allah, al-watan, al-qa'ed" (God, homeland, leader).
- March: "Anthem of the Fedayeen Saddam"
- Equipment: AK-47/AKM assault rifles, RPGs
- Engagements: Iraq War; 2003 invasion of Iraq; Battle of Al-Faw; Battle of Basra; Battle of Nasiriyah; Battle of Najaf; Battle of Samawah; Battle of Karbala; Battle of Baghdad; Iraqi insurgency (2003–2011)

Commanders
- Commanders: Uday Hussein (1995–1996); Qusay Hussein (1996–2003)

Insignia
- Flag

Fedayeen Saddam (Arabic: فدائيي صدام, romanized: Fidāʾiyyī Ṣaddām) was an Iraqi fedayeen paramilitary militia organization loyal to the Ba'athist regime of Saddam Hussein. The group's name means "those who sacrifice themselves for Saddam". At its peak, they had 30,000 to 40,000 members. The Fedayeen operated outside the law and were not bound by any political structures.

== Irregular forces ==
The Fedayeen Saddam was not part of Iraq's regular armed forces but rather operated as a paramilitary unit of irregular forces. As a result of this, the Fedayeen reported directly to the Presidential Palace, rather than through the military chain of command. Whilst paramilitary, the Fedayeen were not an elite military force, often receiving just basic training and operating without heavy weapons. In this they were somewhat similar to the Basij of Iran or Shabiha militia of Ba'athist Syria.

Much like other paramilitaries, the Fedayeen was volunteer based and the units were never given an official salary. As a result, most of the members resorted to extortion and theft of property from the general population, even though the members had access to sanction-evading trade and high quality services (i.e. new cars, hospitals reserved for officials, expensive electronics) and a general standard of living considerably higher than that of the average Iraqi of the time. However, they were ordered not to threaten or harm any government officials. As the group had no overt religious affiliations, it had a mix of Sunni and Shia members although it's said to have been majority Sunni.

The Fedayeen were among the most loyal organizations to the regime of Saddam Hussein and were a politically reliable force against domestic opponents. The militia is directly responsible for some of the regime's most brutal acts. The Fedayeen caught the attention of the international community in 2000 when it was reported that 30 prostitutes were beheaded in Baghdad, Basra, and other major cities. Their heads were left on the front doorsteps of the prostitutes' homes as a "deterrent". Another report revealed that the militia executed eight prisoners on charges of defacing several murals depicting Saddam Hussein. Another example of Fedayeen's brutality was in the spring of 2000, when it was reported that the militia cut out the tongues of four men accused of slandering Saddam Hussein with a pair of shears in Nasiriyah. Then all four were beheaded with a sword.

The Fedayeen played a role in the 2003 invasion of Iraq, proving themselves as the most audacious and fanatic fighters on the Iraqi side. They resisted the American-led invasion by conducting some of the most deadly attacks on U.S. forces, including suicide attacks.

== History ==
=== Early years ===
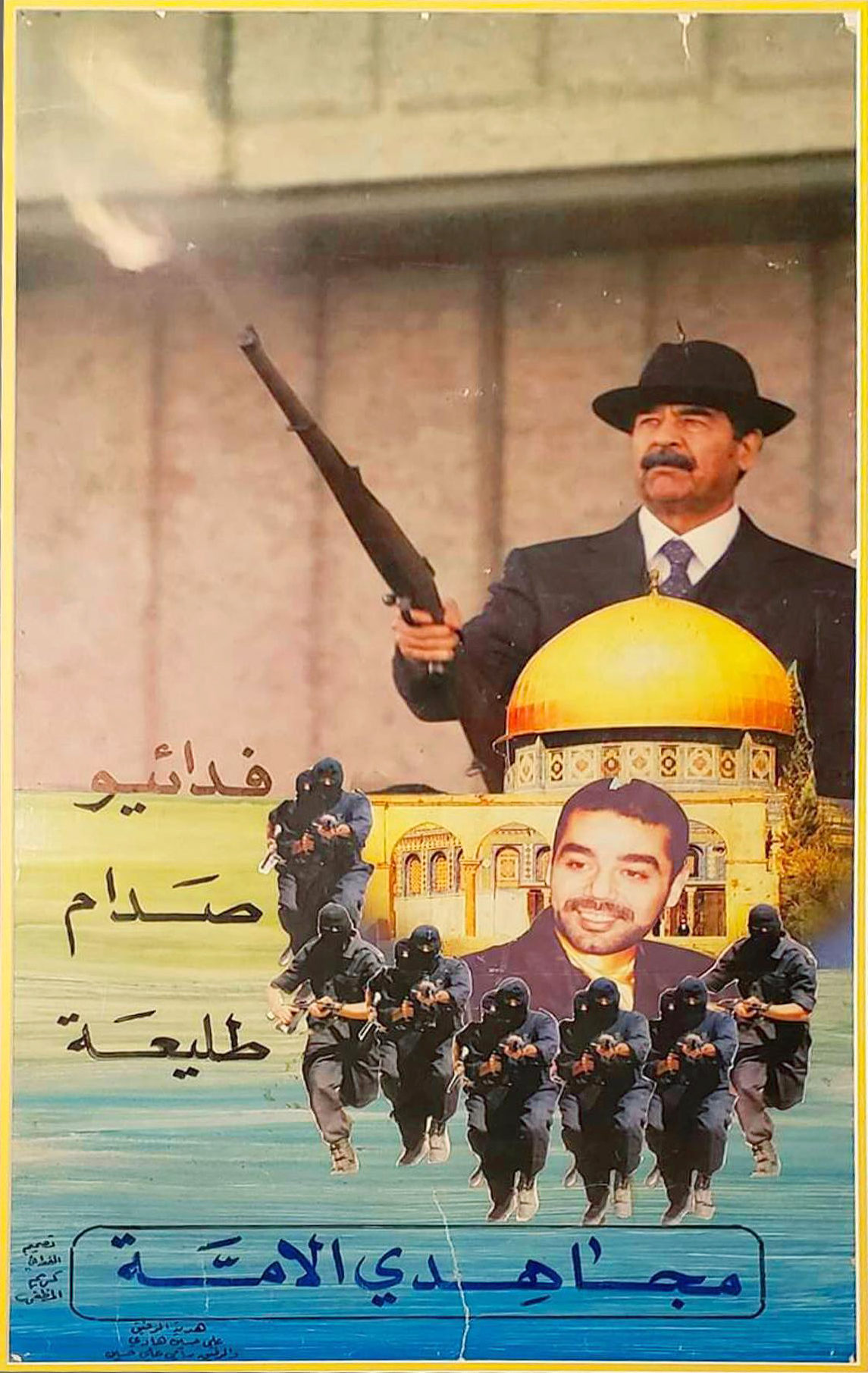
Fedayeen Saddam recruitment propaganda poster

In 1995, Uday Hussein formed the Fedayeen Saddam with 10,000 to 15,000 recruits to maintain internal security in Iraq. The Fedayeen fighters tended to come from Saddam's hometown of Tikrit or were recruited from the Al-Bu Nasir tribe, to which Saddam belonged. Uday used the Fedayeen for personal reasons such as smuggling and the suppression of opponents.

In 1996, command of the militia was handed to Qusay Hussein when it was uncovered that Uday was diverting weapons to the militia from the Iraqi Republican Guard.

In 1998 the Ashbal Saddam (Saddam's Lion Cubs) was created to recruit and train young children for membership in the Fedayeen. The Ashbal recruited boys aged 10 to 15 for military training, from firearms training to more advanced instruction, such as anti-tank tactics and the use of helicopters in raiding operations. They also attended lectures on cultural, political and religious subjects.

Before Saddam was removed from power, the force was placed back under Uday's control.

=== 2003 U.S. invasion ===
The Fedayeen Saddam did not rise to international attention, however, until the 2003 invasion of Iraq by U.S.-led Coalition forces. Whereas the Iraqi army and the Republican Guard quickly collapsed, Fedayeen forces put up stiff resistance to the coalition invasion. U.S. strategy was to bypass other cities and head straight to Baghdad. In response, Fedayeen fighters entrenched themselves in the cities and launched guerrilla-style attacks on rear supply convoys. These convoys were attempting but usually falling short of keeping up with the rapid advance to Baghdad. They were attempting to sustain the rapid advance by bringing up food, water, ammunition, medical supplies and mail from back home. These were very lightly armed cargo trucks driving as fast as they could on dirt roads mainly in southern Iraq, after loading supplies in Kuwait. Once they started to get close to central Iraq more and more paved roads were available. They were almost always at least a few days behind. This made the resupply convoys vulnerable to attack. In these trucks were usually low to mid ranking enlisted soldiers with mostly no combat experience. For instance these cargo trucks mainly were only defended by the two rifles the driver and truck commander had. So even with a relatively small force the Fedayeen could attack several of the last trucks in a convoy, or trucks that had lost contact with the convoy. It was easy for the Fedayeen to capture or destroy these isolated poorly defended vehicles. The Fedayeen also used intimidation in an attempt to maintain morale in the Iraqi army and to keep civilians from rebelling. The multinational coalition was forced to turn its attention to the slow task of rooting out irregular forces from the southern cities, delaying the advance by two weeks. During the invasion, Fedayeen fighters mostly wielded AK-47 assault rifles, rocket-propelled grenades, machine guns, and truck-mounted artillery and mortars. They made extensive use of subterfuge in an attempt to blunt the overwhelming technological advantage used by the invading forces.

By the end of the first week of April, Coalition forces had mostly succeeded in rooting out Fedayeen forces from the southern cities. The Shiite population was very un-supportive of the fighters, although many were intimidated. This factor, coupled with overwhelming firepower, quickly gave U.S. forces in the area a decisive edge. This reduced the pressure on the stretched supply lines, enabling the advance to continue. On 9 April, Baghdad fell to U.S. forces with only sporadic resistance by Fedayeen irregulars, foreign volunteers, and remnants of the Special Republican Guard, effectively ending the regime of Saddam Hussein. Tikrit, the last city to fall, was taken on 15 April.

The Fedayeen Saddam was officially dissolved on 23 May 2003, per Order 2 of the Coalition Provisional Authority under Administrator Paul Bremer.

=== Iraqi insurgency ===
The fall of Baghdad effectively ended the existence of the Fedayeen Saddam as an organized paramilitary. Some of its members died during the war while others fled to neighboring Syria. A large number survived, however, and were willing to carry on the fight even after the fall of Saddam Hussein from power. The de-Ba'athification campaign sent many former Fedayeen members into the arms of Sunni guerrilla organizations, including jihadist groups such as Jama'at al-Tawhid wal-Jihad that began to form to resist the U.S.-led occupation, while the Shi'ite members of the Fedayeen went on to join the Mahdi Army. By June 2003, an insurgency was clearly underway in central and northern Iraq, especially in the area known as the Sunni Triangle. Some units of the Fedayeen also continued to operate independently of other insurgent organizations in the Sunni areas of Iraq. On 30 November 2003, a U.S. convoy traveling through the town of Samarra in the Sunni Triangle was ambushed by over 100 Iraqi guerrillas, reportedly wearing trademark Fedayeen Saddam uniforms. Exactly how much influence they had in the resistance, especially following Saddam Hussein's capture on 13 December 2003, was a source of controversy. Four former members of Fedayeen Saddam were arrested in the volatile Salah al-Din province on 14 May 2004, for the abduction, transfer, and gruesome beheading of American Nicholas Berg.

In 2015, Der Spiegel reported that virtually all of the leaders of the Islamic State (ISIS) are officers who had previously served in Saddam Hussein's army and intelligence services, including Fedayeen Saddam paramilitary militia.

=== Additional roles ===
The Fedayeen has been cited as carrying out some of the most brutal acts of the pro-Saddam militias. Fedayeen Saddam committed torture and executions involving beatings, breaking bones, gouging out eyes, throwing people off of high buildings, chopping off fingers, ears and genitals, cutting out tongues, piercing hands with electric drills, ritualized mutilations and amputations. Additionally, they were thought to have acted as enforcers for the Iraqi army in order to prevent desertion. There were also reports of men being executed by being blown up with explosives packed around their bodies. In the last two years of Hussein's rule, a campaign of beheadings, mainly targeting women suspected of prostitution and carried out by his elite Fedayeen unit, killed more than 200 people, human rights groups reported at the time. According to a U.S. State Department report, "Many of the victims were not engaged in prostitution, but were targeted for political reasons,".

== Appearance ==
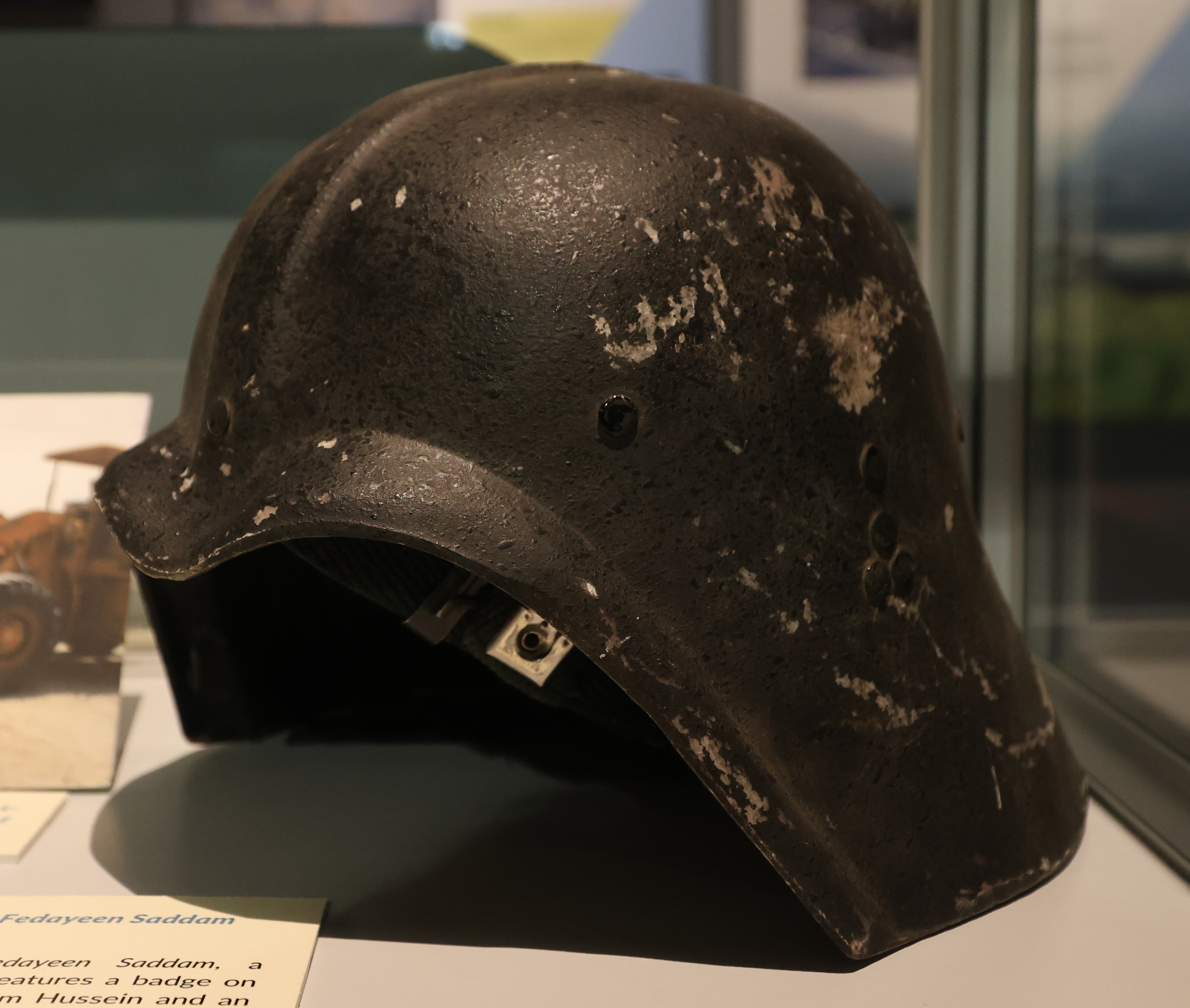
A Fedayeen Saddam helmet, displayed at the Army Flying Museum, United Kingdom.

The Fedayeen Saddam wore two uniforms, an all black one worn on operations and an all white one worn on parade. They also operated in plain clothes in order to confuse Coalition forces.

A black Darth Vader style helmet was also worn by some of the black-uniformed Fedayeen, as Uday Hussein (commander of the Fedayeen and eldest son of Saddam) was reportedly an avid fan of Star Wars. The helmet shell was made of fibreglass, with a nylon webbing cradle. Fixed to the right side was a moulded rubber Fedayeen badge, which consisted of a silhouette of Saddam and the motto; Allah al-watan al-qa'ed (God, homeland, leader).

== Equipment ==
The Fedayeen militiamen were equipped as light infantry emphasize in speed and mobility, meant they were armed with small arms and light weaponry like AK-47/AKM variant Kalashnikov assault rifles, RPD light machine guns, and RPG anti-tank grenade launchers. They used technicals against Coalition force with limited success but were outmatched by Coalition force's armor and aviation units.

== See also ==
- "Blessed July"
- Popular Army (Iraq)
- Salman Pak facility
