= Blessed July =

Planned suicide attacks by Fedayeen Saddam

Blessed July (Arabic: تموز مبارك, Tamooz Mubarak) was the codename for a plan to launch a series of bombings and assassinations on targets in and outside of Iraq. These operations were ordered by Saddam Hussein's Fedayeen Saddam in May 1999, supposedly Uday Hussein himself, to use martyrs as suicide bombers.

Blessed July operations were split into two branches, bombings and assassinations. Fifty members of Fedayeen Saddam were selected to carry out Blessed July operations. The martyrs were divided into three teams of ten that operated in London, Iran, and "self-ruled areas" in Iraq.

Defense analyst Kevin Woods described Blessed July as "a regime-directed wave of "martyrdom" operations against targets in the West." Woods claims that plans for Blessed July "were well under way at the time of the coalition invasion"; he also notes that the Fedayeen was racked by corruption. "In the years preceding the coalition invasion," he continues, "Iraq's leaders had become enamored of the belief that the spirit of the Fedayeen's 'Arab warriors' would allow them to overcome the Americans' advantages. In the end, however, the Fedayeen fighters proved totally unprepared for the kind of war they were asked to fight, and they died by the thousands." BBC Correspondent Paul Reynolds writes of the "Blessed July" plans, "What these targets might have been is not stated and the plans, like so many drawn up by the Iraqis, came to nothing, it seems."
