= 41st Infantry Regiment (United States) =

- 41st Infantry Regiment insignia
- Active: 1917-1921; 1926; 1927-present
- Country: United States
- Branch: United States Army
- Type: Infantry
- Nickname: "Dynasty"
- Mottos: Straight and Stalwart
- Engagements: Indian Wars; World War II: Operation Torch (with Arrowhead); Sicily (with Arrowhead); Normandy; Northern France; Rhineland; Ardennes-Alsace; Central Europe; Operation Desert Storm; Operation Iraqi Freedom Operation Enduring Freedom; Operation Freedom Sentinel Operation Joint Guardian; Korea Rotational Forces Joint Task Force-Southern Border

Commanders
- Commanding officer: LTC Richard Gasperini
- Command Sergeant Major: CSM Omar Maldonado

Insignia
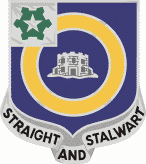
- Distinctive unit insignia

The U.S. 41st Infantry Regiment is a regiment of the United States Army. Its 1st Battalion is currently assigned to the 2nd Stryker Brigade Combat Team, 4th Infantry Division. Its 3rd Battalion was assigned to the 1st Armored Brigade Combat Team, 1st Armored Division, which was replaced in 2018 by 4th Battalion, 70th Armor Regiment, 1st Brigade Combat Team, 1st Armored Division.

== History ==
=== 41st United States Infantry Regiment ===
The 41st United States Infantry Regiment was one of six segregated regiments (2 cavalry and 4 infantry) created in 1866 following the American Civil War to provide for African American participation in the defense of the United States. It was consolidated in 1869 with the 38th Infantry Regiment to form the 24th Infantry Regiment. It is not related to the current 41st Infantry Regiment.

Significant dates:

- Constituted 1866-07-28 in the Regular Army as the 41st United States Infantry Regiment
- Organized 1866-12-25 at Baton Rouge, Louisiana
- Consolidated 1869-03-15 with the 38th United States Infantry Regiment; consolidated units redesignated as 24th Infantry Regiment.

=== 20th century ===
==== World War I ====
The 41st Infantry Regiment was formed on 20 June 1917 at Fort Snelling, Minnesota, around a cadre from soldiers of the 3rd Battalion, 36th Infantry Regiment. On 9 July 1918, the regiment was assigned to the 10th Division at Camp Funston, Kansas, which was commanded by Leonard Wood. Here, the 41st prepared for deployment to Europe to fight in World War I. In October 1918, the regiment sent an advance party to France to prepare for the deployment, however, the war ended in November before the regiment could deploy.

==== Interwar period ====
On 18 November 1920, the regiment was transferred to Camp Meade, Maryland. On 22 September 1921, the regiment was inactivated, allotted to the Third Corps Area, and its personnel were transferred to the 34th Infantry Regiment. The 28th Infantry Regiment was designated the "Active Associate" unit from which the 41st Infantry would obtain cadre to be activated in the event of war; on 17 July 1922, the 34th Infantry became the 41st Infantry's Active Associate unit.

On 24 March 1923, the 41st Infantry was assigned to the 8th Division. It was activated on 26 March 1926 as a "Regular Army Inactive" (RAI) unit with Organized Reserve personnel at Fort Eustis, Virginia, but was inactivated on 29 November 1926. It was withdrawn from the Third Corps Area on 28 February 1927 and allotted to the Second Corps Area, and the 34th Infantry was relieved as Active Associate. It was affiliated with the Syracuse University Reserve Officers Training Corps program and organized on 30 June 1927 as an RAI unit with personnel assigned to the ROTC Detachment and Reserve officers commissioned from the program. The regiment conducted summer training most years at Fort Niagara, New York, and some years at Camp Dix, New Jersey.

The coat of arms for the 41st Infantry was originally approved on 28 June 1921, while the distinctive unit insignia, consisting of the shield and regimental motto, was approved on 10 August 1933. The coat of arms of the regiment shows a blue shield, the color for infantry. The castle represents the regiment's birthplace at Fort Snelling, Minnesota. In the upper left corner, an image of a green star fort is taken from the distinctive unit insignia of the 36th Infantry, which provided the regiment's cadre during World War I; the yellow circle, or annulet, represents part of an unofficial insignia of the 10th Division, to which the unit was assigned during the war.

The 41st Infantry was relieved on 1 July 1940 from the 8th Division, and was ordered to active duty, less Reserve personnel, on 15 July 1940 as the 41st Infantry (Armored), at Fort Benning, Georgia. The 41st Infantry Regiment constituted the organic infantry of the newly formed 2nd Armored Division. The association between the 41st Infantry and the 2nd Armored Division lasted throughout World War II and continued through Operation Desert Storm.

==== World War II ====
The regiment was part of the Western Task Force of Operation Torch, which landed at Casablanca in French Morocco on 8 November 1942. Later it was an active participant in the invasion of Sicily (July 10, 1943 - August 17, 1943). With the 2nd Armored Division the 41st would play an integral role in the arduous Normandy Campaign, the Battle of the Bulge and the Western Allied invasion of Germany. The regiment was awarded four Presidential Unit Citations during the Second World War, including one for leading the breakout from Normandy and a later citation for actions in the invasion of Germany itself.

==== Cold War ====
In 1964, a crest was added to the coat of arms. The three waves represent the regiment's three assault landings during World War II. A red lion taken from the coat of arms of Belgium breaks a spear representing Nazi Germany, and a castle with four ramparts represents "Fortress Europe" and the regiment's four Distinguished Unit Citations from the war.

Reorganized and redesignated 1 July 1963 as the 1st Battalion, 41st Infantry. On 22 March 1983, the battalion was issued its first M2 Bradley Fighting Vehicles. After a long summer of training, the battalion conducted an ARTEP in December 1983. In November 1984, the battalion received movement orders to rotate to the 2nd Armored Division (Forward) in early summer 1986 as the Army's first COHORT rotational battalion. Upon arriving at Garlstedt, Germany, the 1st Battalion, 41st Infantry proved its combat readiness by leading the way in numerous field exercises. There were four mechanized infantry battalions of the 41st Infantry in the division at this time.

==== Operation Desert Storm ====
In late 1990 the 3rd Brigade of the 2nd Armored Division (FWD), then based at Lucius D. Clay Kaserne, 24 km north of Bremen, in the Federal Republic of Germany, was warned to prepare itself for combat operations during the Gulf War. Significant U.S. Army forces were being sent to Saudi Arabia following the Iraqi invasion of Kuwait. Amongst the brigade's units was the 1st Battalion, 41st Infantry, commanded by Lieutenant Colonel James L. Hillman. After arrival in Saudi Arabia, 1st Battalion, 41st Infantry, was task organized (effectively merged in parts) with 3rd Battalion, 66th Armor Regiment. The 4th Battalion of the 3rd Field Artillery Regiment would provide fire support. This 'task organization', routine before combat, was designed to ensure that infantry and armor were present in balanced organizations so that they could provide mutual support. The task force's higher headquarters, 3rd Brigade, 2nd Armored Division, was itself attached to the 1st Infantry Division (Mechanized) to make up for a missing brigade of that division. The brigade became known as Task Force Iron. It would become the spearhead of VII Corps. The brigade was the first to breach the sand berms dividing Saudi and Iraqi territory, and the battalion itself was the first over the berm. On 17 February 1991, Task Force 1-41 became the first coalition unit to conduct ground combat operations in Iraq, engaging in both direct and indirect fire fights. It would participate in the Battle of 73 Easting and the Battle of Norfolk. In the process the task force would earn a Valorous Unit Award for its performance during combat operations.

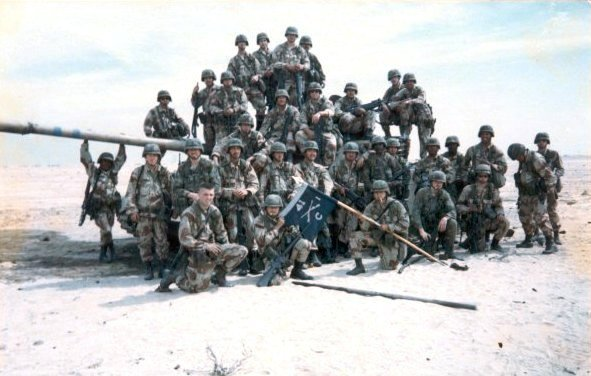
Soldiers of 2nd Platoon, Company C, 1st Battalion, 41st Infantry Regiment pose with a captured Iraqi tank during the 1st Gulf War, February 1991.

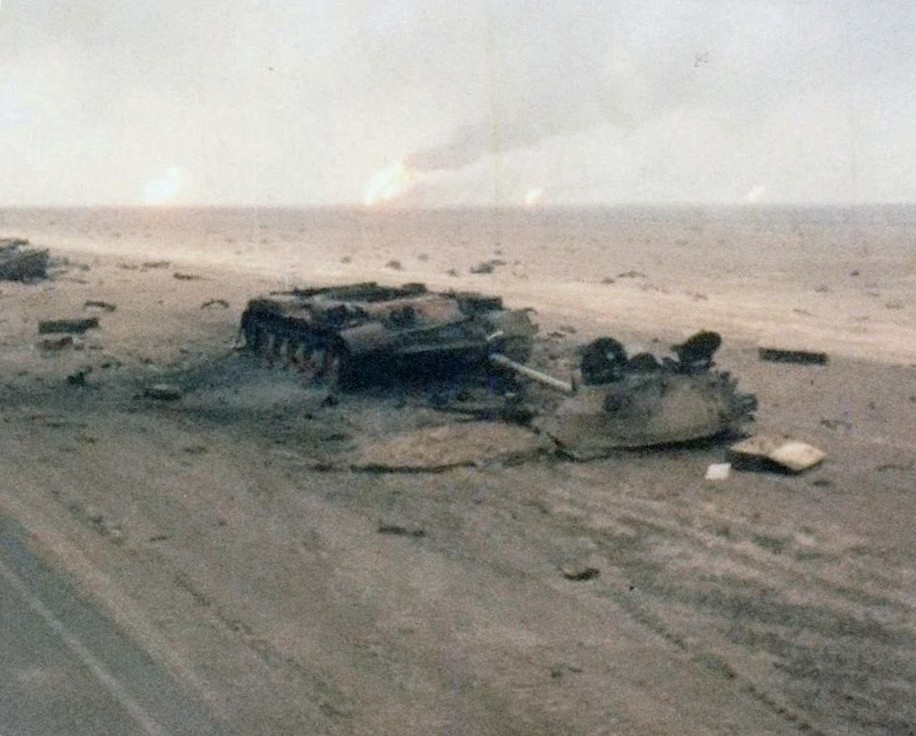
Iraqi tanks destroyed by Task Force 1-41 Infantry during the 1st Gulf War, February 1991.

A year later, the battalion was inactivated on 15 June 1992 in Germany.

3rd Battalion also participated in the Gulf War, deploying as part of Tiger Brigade with the 2nd Armored Division to Dhahran, Saudi Arabia. The Main Body Deployed on 9 October 1990. Upon arrival in Saudi Arabia, 3-41 honed its war-fighting skills and deterred Iraqi aggression from 9 October 1990 to 19 January 1991. During this time 3-41 led Tiger Brigade in the first brigade size movement in recent history, transitioned to the M2A2 Bradley Fighting Vehicle, and task organized into a balanced task force. Tiger Brigade linked up with the 2nd Marine Division as the air war began on 15 January 1991. 3-41 Infantry led the Tiger Brigade Attack into Kuwait on 24 Feb 1991. The unit was called the "Straight and Stalwart Battalion Task Force" during the war. During the invasion, 3-41 destroyed a large number of enemy vehicles, captured over 1,000 prisoners and accomplished all missions during the 100 hours of combat. On 27 Feb 1991 3-41 Infantry participated in the Battle of Kuwait International Airport alongside units of the U.S. Marine Corps. Also, on 27 Feb 1991 the 3-41 scouts linked up with EPAC (Eastern Province Area Command) forces and guided them to Kuwait City through friendly lines to liberate the city. This marked the end of the ground war. 3-41 secured the local area and completed post combat actions once the cease-fire was declared. On 29 March 1991, 3-41 Infantry redeployed to Dhahran, Saudi Arabia. The battalion returned to Fort Hood, Texas, on 17 April 1991. The soldiers of the Straight and Stalwart Battalion earned more awards for valor than any unit in Kuwait. A year later, the battalion was inactivated on 15 June 1992 in Germany.

The battalion was reactivated on 16 December 1992 at Fort Polk, Louisiana, after the 5th Infantry Division there had been redesignated as the 2nd Armored Division. It was then inactivated 15 December 1995 at Fort Hood, Texas, and relieved from assignment to the 2nd Armored Division; Assigned 16 February 1996 to the 1st Armored Division, It was activated at Fort Riley, Kansas as the 41st Infantry on 29 March 1996.

Task Force 1-41 Infantry Valorous Unit Award Citation

For extraordinary heroism in action against an armed enemy. Task Force 1-41 was the first coalition force to breach the Saudi Arabian border on 15 February 1991 and conduct ground combat operations in Iraq engaging in direct and indirect fire fights with the enemy on 17 February 1991. The Task Force was part of the VII Corps main attack beginning 24 February 1991 as it conducted a forward passage through 1st Infantry Division elements and began a mission to clear a zone which again resulted in enemy contact. On 26 February, following a 60 kilometer road march, the Task Force immediately engaged in ground combat with armored and dismounted enemy of brigade size. For six hours it was involved in continuous combat with a tenacious and determined enemy occupying extremely well prepared and heavily fortified bunkers. Task Force infantry elements dismounted and engaged the enemy in numerous short range fire fights while methodically clearing the extensive bunker complex. By morning the Task Force had systematically reduced the entrenched enemy positions in zone. Continuing as part of the VII Corps attack the Task Force travelled 85 kilometers in less than 24 hours while engaging at short range multiple, dug in enemy tanks in ambush positions. The Task Force reached its final objective 28 February 1991 with a push which continued the destruction of enemy armored vehicles. During the entire ground campaign, involving their attack through Iraq into Kuwait, Task Force 1-41 travelled over 200 Kilometers in 72 hours and destroyed 65 armored vehicles and 10 artillery pieces, while capturing over 300 enemy prisoners.

=== Post-Cold War ===
==== First Battalion ====
The battalion was reactivated on 16 December 1992 at Fort Polk, Louisiana, after the 5th Infantry Division there had been redesignated as the 2d Armored Division. It was inactivated 15 December 1995 at Fort Hood, Texas, and relieved from assignment to the 2d Armored Division; Assigned 16 February 1996 to the 1st Armored Division and activated at Fort Riley, Kansas; It was activated at Fort Riley, Kansas as the 1st Battalion, 41st Infantry on 29 March 1996, along with Battery C, 1-4th Air Defense Artillery, for garrison operations only.

In January 1997, the 1st Battalion, 41st Infantry Regiment "Dragoons" became the first CONUS-based battalion-sized unit and above to be alerted for deployment to Europe as part of the ongoing peacekeeping effort in the former Yugoslavia, which saw Europe-based U.S. forces arrive in December, 1995. By March, 1997, the Task Force 1-41 Infantry deployed to Bosnia-Herzegovina. The task force was commanded by Lieutenant Colonel Robert Rush and consisted of Alpha Company, "Team Tank" (M1A1 tank company- A company "Ironhorse", 1st Battalion, 13th Armored Regiment), C Company, D Company "Demon Dawgs" and Headquarters and Headquarters Company (HHC) "Headhunters", 1st Battalion, 41st Infantry Regiment. Bravo Company, which was organic to 1st Battalion, 41st Infantry Regiment, and C/1-4 ADA did not deploy with TF 1-41 IN and remained at Fort Riley, assigned to the 1st Battalion, 13th Armored Regiment (Task Force 1-13 AR until December 1997) for the duration of the deployment.

After drawing an equipment set (M1 Abrams and M2 Bradley series combat vehicles) in Europe and arriving in Bosnia-Herzegovina in early April 1997, TF 1-41 Infantry was assigned to Camps Dobol and Demi, both east and southeast of Tuzla, near the zone of separation (ZOS) as enforced by the 1995 Dayton Peace Accords. For about six months, the men and women of TF 1-41 Infantry (Straight and Stalwart) conducted peace enforcement operations in support of Operation Joint Guard as the first iteration of "SFOR" or the "Stabilization Force" after the designation changed from "IFOR" or the "Implementation Force" in early 1997. TF 1-41 IN conducted a variety of missions and patrols in accordance with the General Framework Agreement for Peace in Bosnia and Herzegovina and corresponding rules of engagement (ROE) while operating within its area of responsibility. TF 1-41 IN's operations essentially culminated with the first municipal elections held all over Bosnia on 13–14 September 1997, occurring without significant incident. TF 1-41 handed responsibility of their sector to the 2nd Squadron, 2nd Armored Cavalry Regiment (Light) "Cougars" from Fort Polk, Louisiana and redeployed home to Fort Riley, Kansas in October, 1997, at the successful completion of their mission. TF 1-41 received the Army's Superior Unit Award for its work in the former Yugoslavia. "Team Tank" which consisted of 2 M1A1 tank platoons and 1 M2 Bradley platoon (1 organic tank platoon was detached and assigned to A/1-41 IN at Camp Demi) returned to the 1st Battalion, 13th Armored Regiment in December, 1997 while B/1-41 IN and C/1-4 ADA was reassigned to their organic 1st Battalion, 41st Infantry Regiment at the same time.

In 2002 the 1st Battalion, 41st Infantry Regiment deployed to Kuwait for a rotation in Operation Desert Spring with 3ID where it did six months in the hot Kuwaiti desert. The battalion then deployed back home for three months not knowing they would be deployed into action by 3rd ID to deploy with them for the Iraqi invasion in 2003. The battalion followed behind 3rd ID until coming up on Tallil Air Base where they were caught by the big sandstorm of 2003. Later the next day they had received word that the 82nd Airborne Division was landing at the Air Base and needed Mech support. Once the two linked up they moved on to the town of As Samawah where major combat took place. This is now known as the Battle of Samawah. 1-41 had also assigned one of its companies (C Company) to 101st to fight in Karbala. During these two major battles it lost two of its best soldiers, SGT Butler and SPC Brown. After ground combat was declared over, the battalion was split up, with its (A Company) being attached to 2nd Battalion 70 tank Regiment. Each Battalion gave up one company to the other Battalion. The fact that 1-41 had earlier done its Kuwait rotation its (B and C Companies) were sent home right after the ground war was declared over. Alpha Company would remain in Iraq, attached to 2-70, and would redeploying home later in March 2004. Alpha Company would remain attached to 2-70 for the next 3 years, deploying with 2–70 in January 2005 to Yusufiyah and Taji, Iraq and redeployed home January 2006.

In August 2004, battalion personnel, having newly arrived from Fort Riley, Kansas and attached to the 2nd Brigade Combat Team, 10th Mountain Division, conducted a right-seat ride with the troopers of the 2nd Battalion, 8th Cavalry Regiment, 1st Brigade Combat Team, 1st Cavalry Division. A right-seat ride gave incoming units a chance to see what the current units were doing. The right-seat ride lasted two days, beginning 2 August, and was carried out around Camp Cuervo in northeastern Baghdad, where 2-8th Cavalry was located. During the right-seat ride, 1-41st Infantry personnel took the extra seats in the 2-8th Cavalry troopers' vehicles and tagged along for the ride, standing back to study how certain things were done at some points and getting their feet wet to help at others.

The battalion was redesignated 1 October 2005 as the 1st Battalion, 41st Infantry Regiment; relieved 16 April 2007 from assignment to the 1st Armored Division and assigned to the 3d Brigade Combat Team, 1st Armored Division; and then inactivated 15 March 2008 at Fort Riley, Kansas. In March 2008, the 1st Battalion, 41st Infantry Regiment was inactivated along with the rest of the 3rd Brigade, 1st Armored Division. The 3rd Brigade, 1st Armored Division was reflagged as the 2nd Brigade Combat Team, 1st Infantry Division. 1-41st Infantry's mission was to deploy, with or without equipment, build combat power, conduct military operations in support of the 3d Brigade Combat Team (not to be confused with the modular brigade combat team), or other headquarters, and redeploys.

The 3d Brigade, 1st Armored Division was subsequently reorganized as the 3rd Brigade Combat Team and reactivated at Fort Bliss, Texas. The 1st Battalion, 41st Infantry Regiment was subsequently reactivated as part of the reorganized brigade in July 2009 (official Army lineage sources state 16 August 2009).

In 2014, 1st Battalion, 41st Infantry was serving with the International Security Assistance Force's Train Assist Advise Command North in northern Afghanistan. It relieved another U.S. battalion in January 2014.

Reorganized and Redesignated 1 April 2015 at Fort Carson, Colorado.

In March 2016, Bravo and Delta companies from 1st Battalion, 41st Infantry Regiment, 2nd Infantry Brigade Combat Team, 4th Infantry Division deployed to Kandahar Province, Afghanistan. Attached to the 2-77 Field Artillery battalion, 2nd Brigade Combat Team, 4th Infantry Division conducted defensive ground operations to cease enemy operations as members of Task Force South.

In April 2018, 1st Battalion, 41st Infantry Regiment, 2nd Infantry Brigade Combat Team, 4th Infantry Division conducted ground defensive patrols in Helmand Province, Afghanistan as members of Task Force South West to protect the area of operations from enemy operations.

==== Third Battalion ====
In 2002 1st Battalion deployed to Kuwait for a rotation in Operation Desert Spring with the 3rd Infantry Division where it spent six months in the hot Kuwaiti desert. The 41st then deployed back home for 3 months not knowing they would be call back into action by the 3rd ID to deploy with them for the 2003 invasion of Iraq. The 1-41st regiment followed behind the 3rd ID until coming up on Tallil AFB where they were caught by the big sandstorm of 2003. The 1-41st had also assigned their C Company to 101st Airborne Division to fight in Karbala. Because the 41st Regiment had recently been deployed to Kuwait, then were immediately recalled for service in Iraq, they were sent home right after the ground war phase was declared over.

The battalion was officially redesignated on 1 October 2005 as the 3rd Battalion, 41st Infantry Regiment; it was relieved on 16 April 2007 and assigned to the 1st Brigade Combat Team, 1st Armored Division. The 3rd Battalion, 41st Infantry Regiment was subsequently reactivated as part of the reorganized 1st Brigade Combat Team, 1st Armored Division in July 2009 at Fort Bliss, TX.

In December, 2012, 3-41 IN BN deployed to the Arghandab River Valley, Kandahar Province in Southern Afghanistan in support of Operation Enduring Freedom with the mission to secure the Zharay District, the original birthplace of the Taliban, and enable the Afghan National Army to control the district upon their departure. In June 2013, 3-41 was additionally tasked with providing assured mobility, enabling LOCs (Lines of Communication) through the Maiwand District to the Helmand Province. The battalion redeployed to Fort Bliss TX in September 2013 after 9 successful months of fighting.

Within a year of redeployment from Afghanistan, 3-41 was once again called upon, deploying to Fort Knox, KY in support of Cadet Training from March to August 2014.

== Campaign credits ==
World War II: Algeria-French Morocco (with arrowhead); Sicily (with arrowhead); Normandy; Northern France; Rhineland; Ardennes-Alsace; Central Europe

Southwest Asia: Desert Shield; Liberation and Defense of Kuwait; Cease-Fire

Southwest Asia: Campaigns to be determined

Afghanistan: Operation Enduring Freedom

Dijaboudi Africa: Operation Enduring Freedom

== Decorations ==
- Presidential Unit Citation(Army) for NORMANDY
- Presidential Unit Citation (Army) for CHERBOURG
- Presidential Unit Citation (Army) for PUFFENDORF-ROER
- Presidential Unit Citation (Army) for ARDENNES
- Belgian Fourragere 1940
  - Cited in the Order of the Day of the Belgian Army for action in Belgium
  - Cited in the Order of the Day of the Belgian Army for action in the Ardennes
- Valorous Unit Award for IRAQ-KUWAIT 1991, Afghanistan 2012
- Army Superior Unit Award for 1997
- Presidential Unit Citation (Army) for April 2003 for action in As Samawah
- Meritorious Unit Commendation (Army) for IRAQ 2004–2005, AFGHANISTAN 2012–2013, AFGHANISTAN 2016, AFGHANISTAN 2018

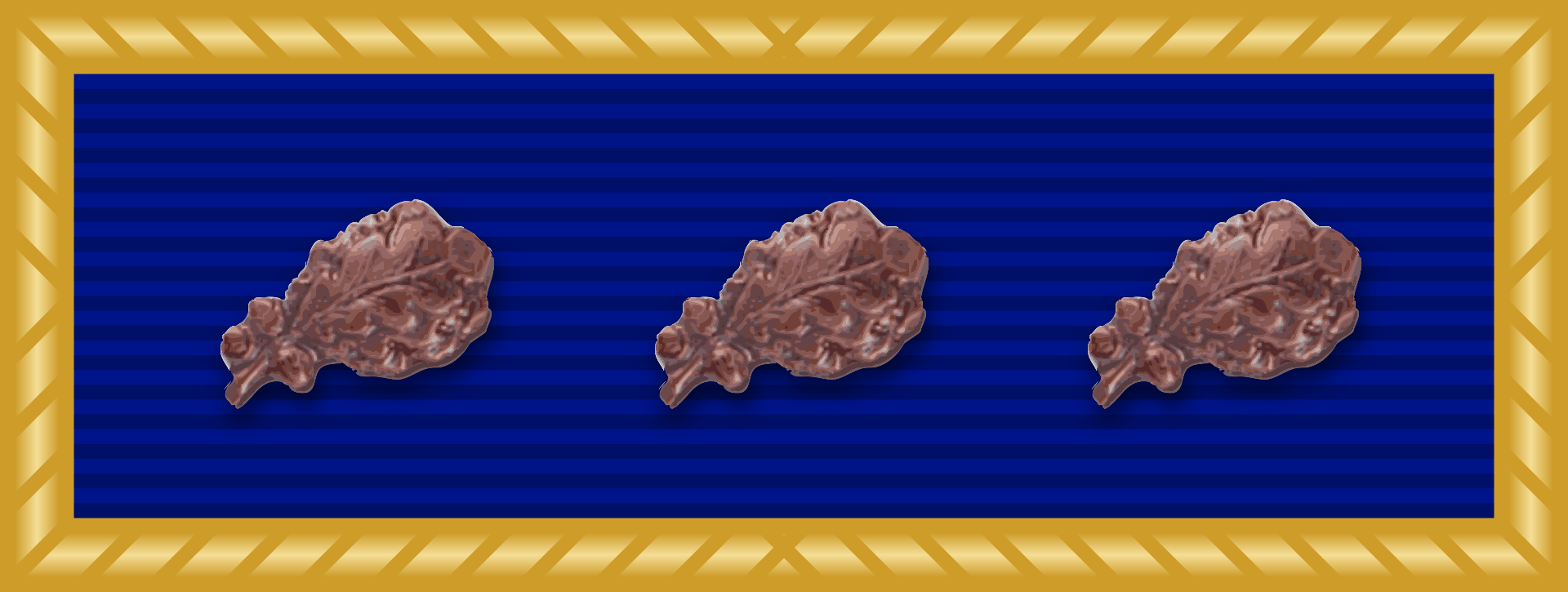
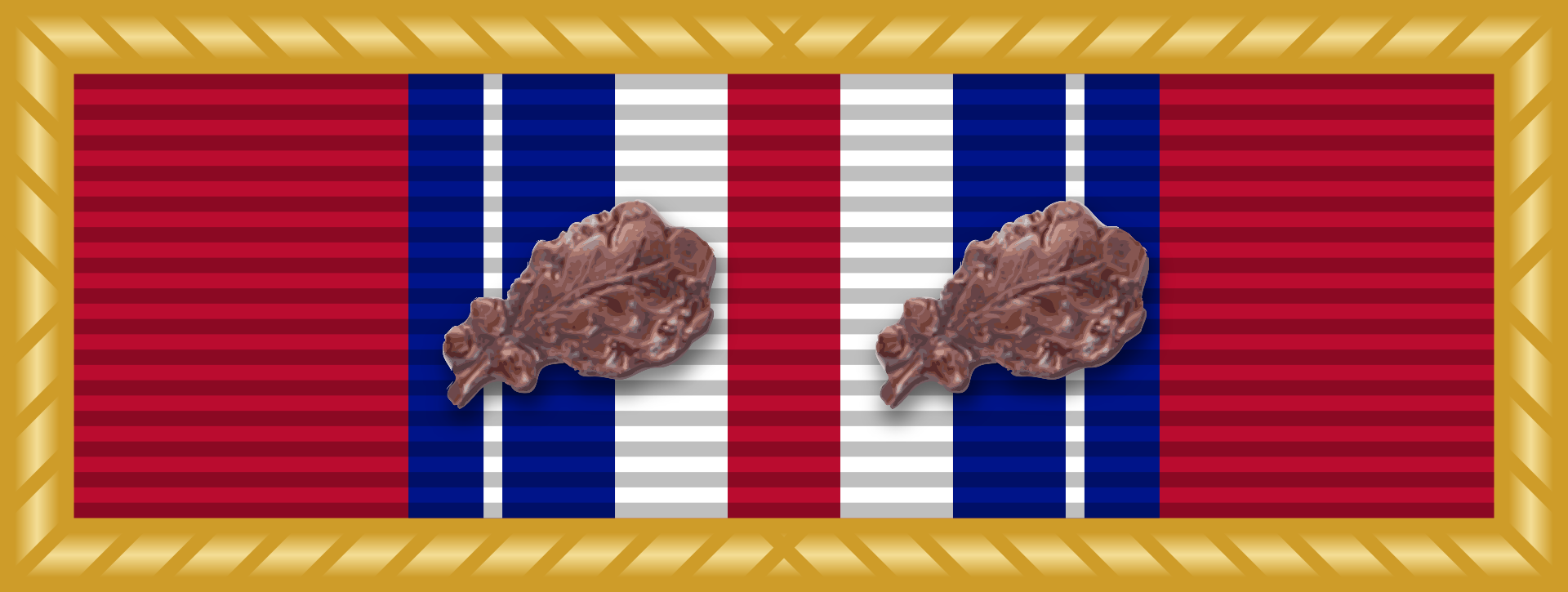
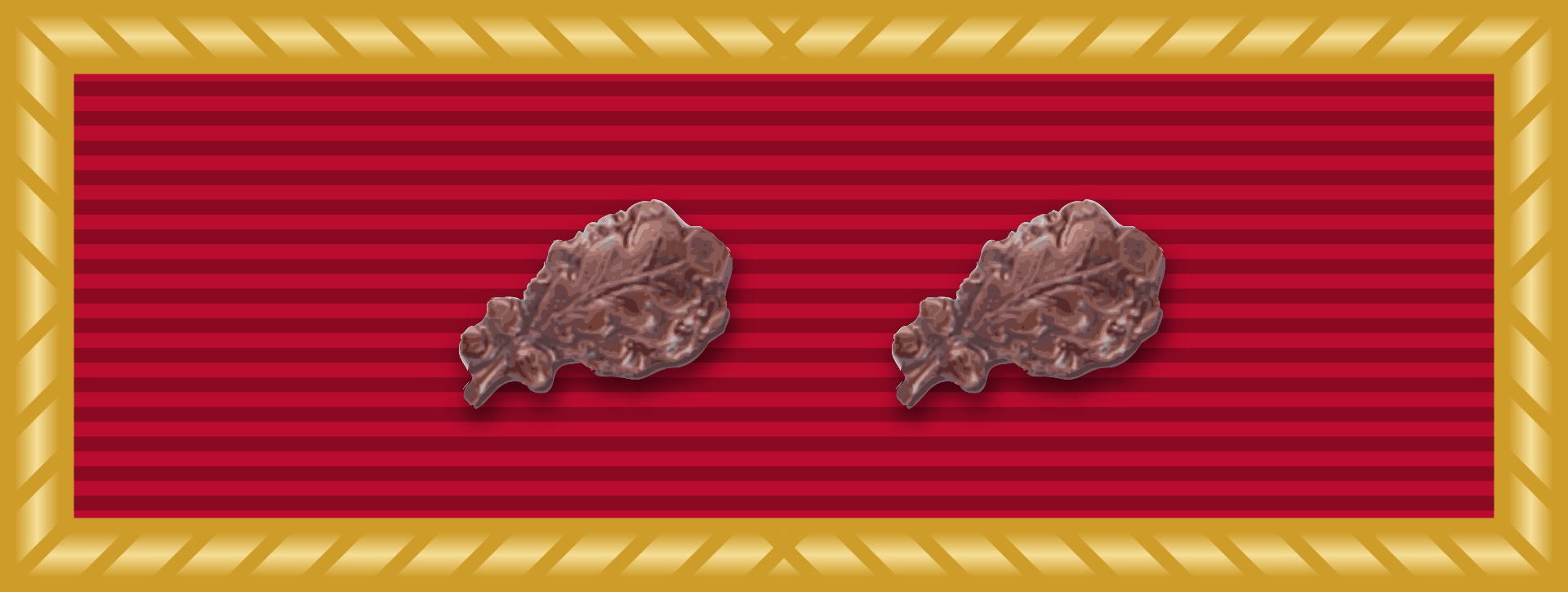
