= Lion Cubs =

Child soldiers in the Middle East

The Lion Cubs, also known as Ashbal (Arabic: أشبال), are child soldiers in the Middle East.

== Lion Cubs – Al Qaeda ==
The Ashbal Al Qaeda (Arabic: أشبال القاعدة) Lion Cubs of Al Qaeda have appeared in Morocco, Iraq, and places in between.

== Lion Cubs – Saddam Hussein ==
Since 1991, Saddam Hussein's Ashbal child soldiers in Iraq employed training techniques intended to desensitize the youth to violence, including frequent beatings and deliberate cruelty to animals. The exact numbers of the Ashbal Saddam were not known, but there were an estimated 8,000 members in Baghdad alone. The boys are ages 10-15 years old. After they reach 16 they move on to the Fedayeen Saddam.

== Lion Cubs – Lebanon ==
Ashbal in Lebanon since spring 1969 have been led by Palestinian Arab leaders like Yasser Arafat, A. Shukairy and George Habash, who initially dubbed them 'baby tigers' and were active in the 1970s and 1980s. Some were as young as eight years of age.

The boys were taught to dismantle, clean and reassemble rifles, pistols and machine guns and are allowed to fire live ammunition. They underwent a Mau Mau-like hardening course in which each boy was required to tear apart a live chicken to develop a lust for killing. Chants which these children, termed 'junior terrorists', had to learn and repeat included: "Oh Zionists, do you think you are safe? Drinking blood is the habit of our men" and "We are from Fatah! We have come to kill you all!"

== Lion Cubs – ISIS ==
The Cubs of the Caliphate is a programme by the Islamic State to recruit and train child soldiers between the ages of 10 and 15.

== See also ==
- Die Wahre Religion
