= Najaf =

Najaf ٱلنَّجَف Najaf al-Ashraf, Baniqia
- Metropolis
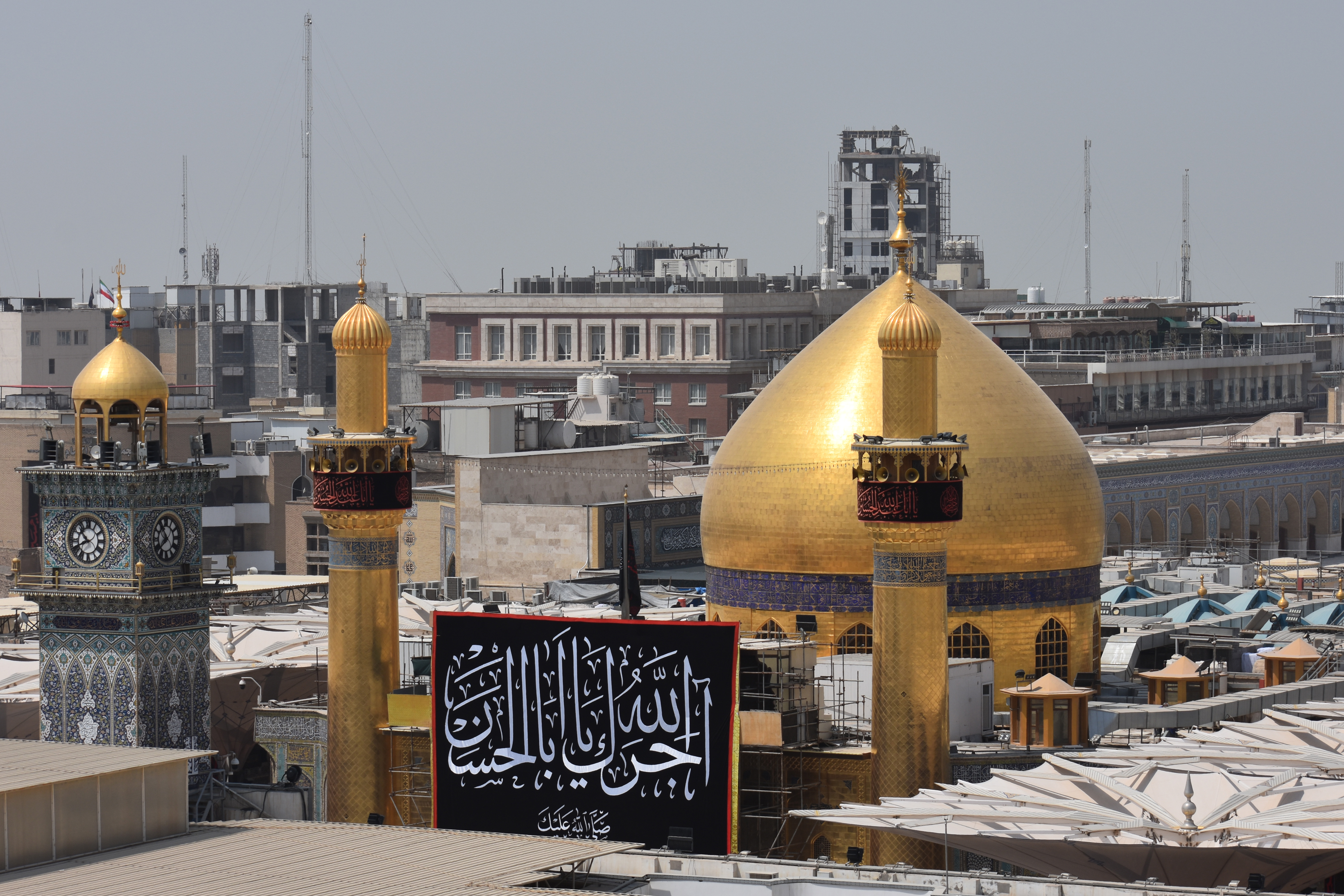
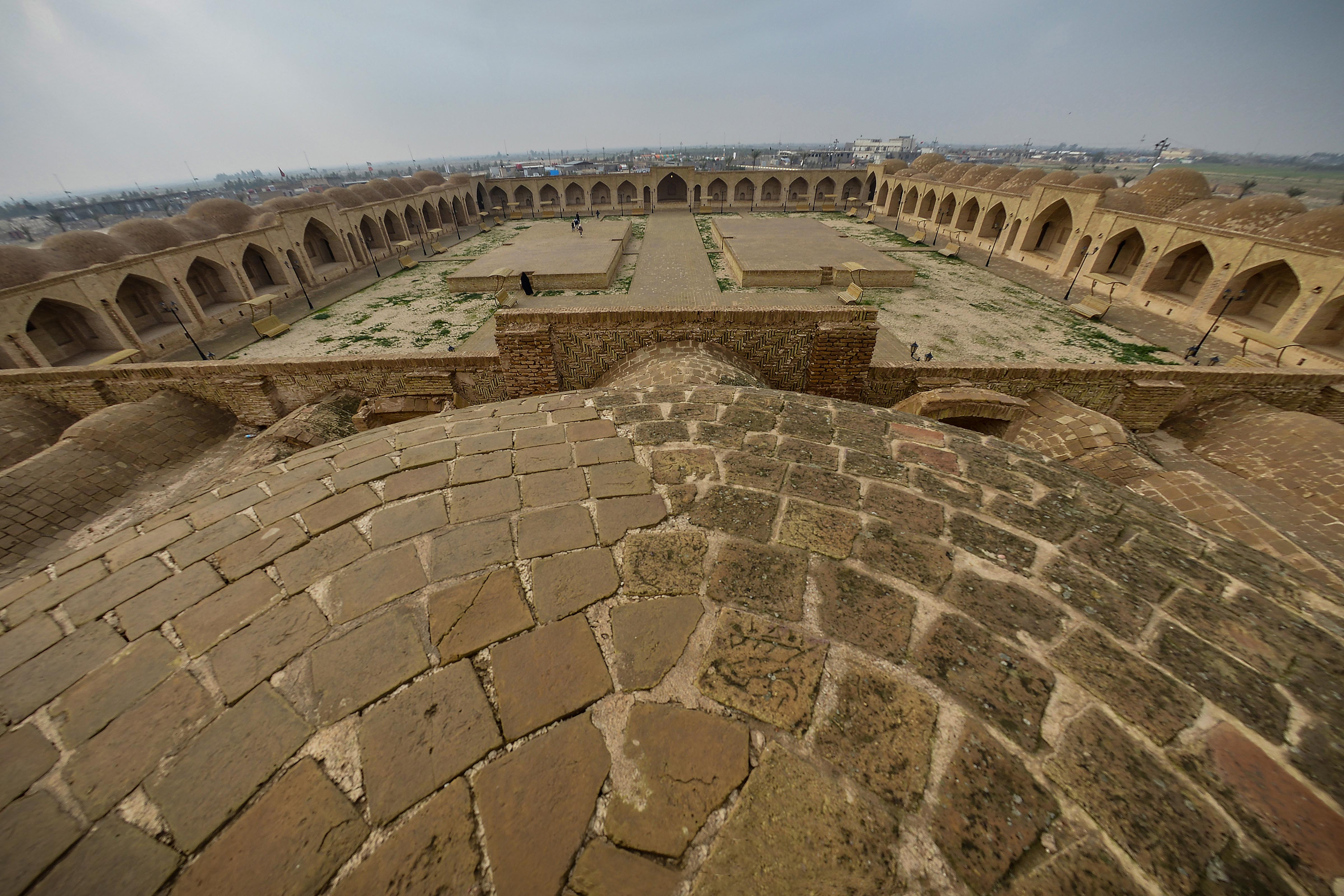
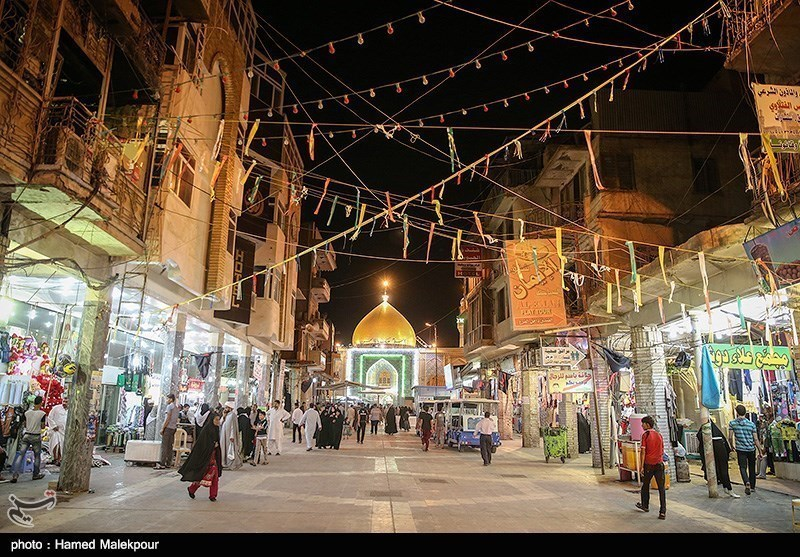
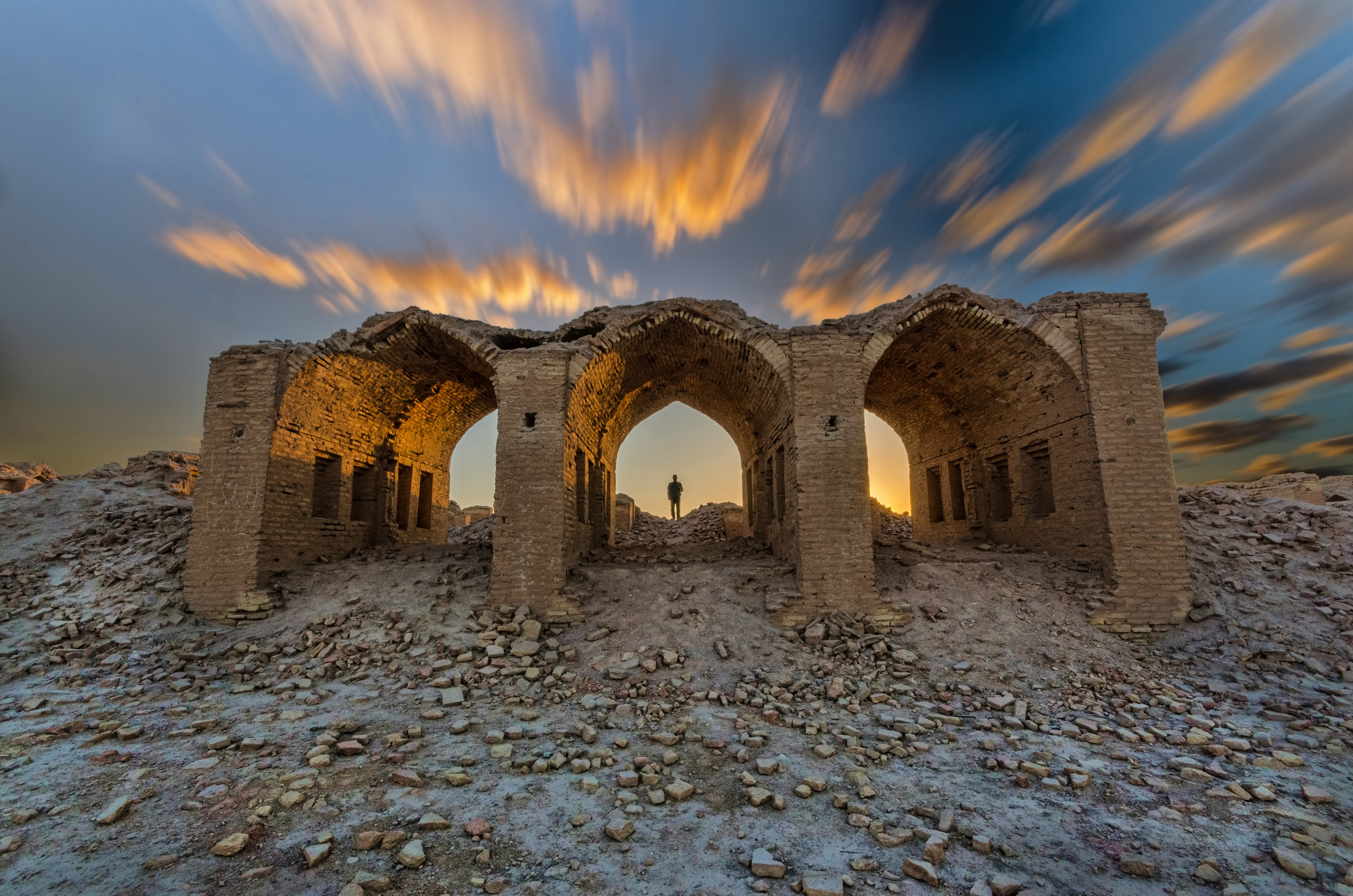
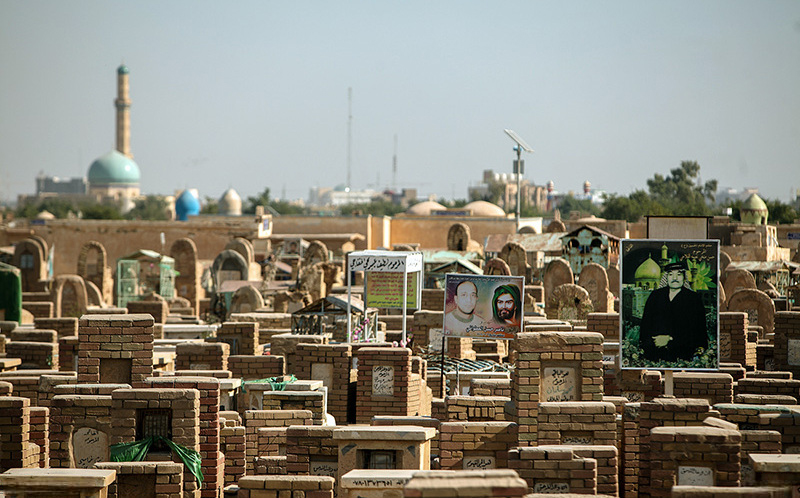
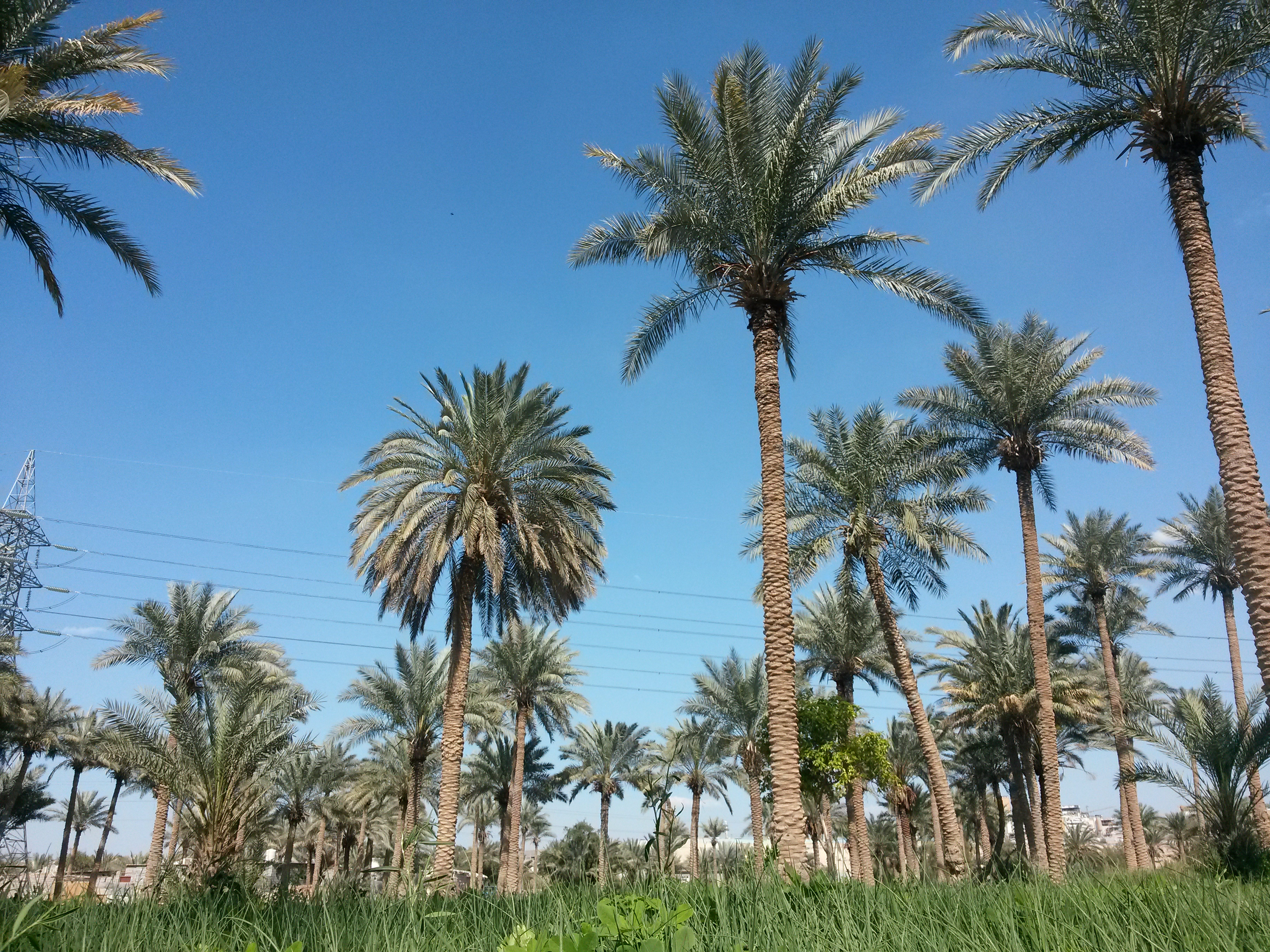
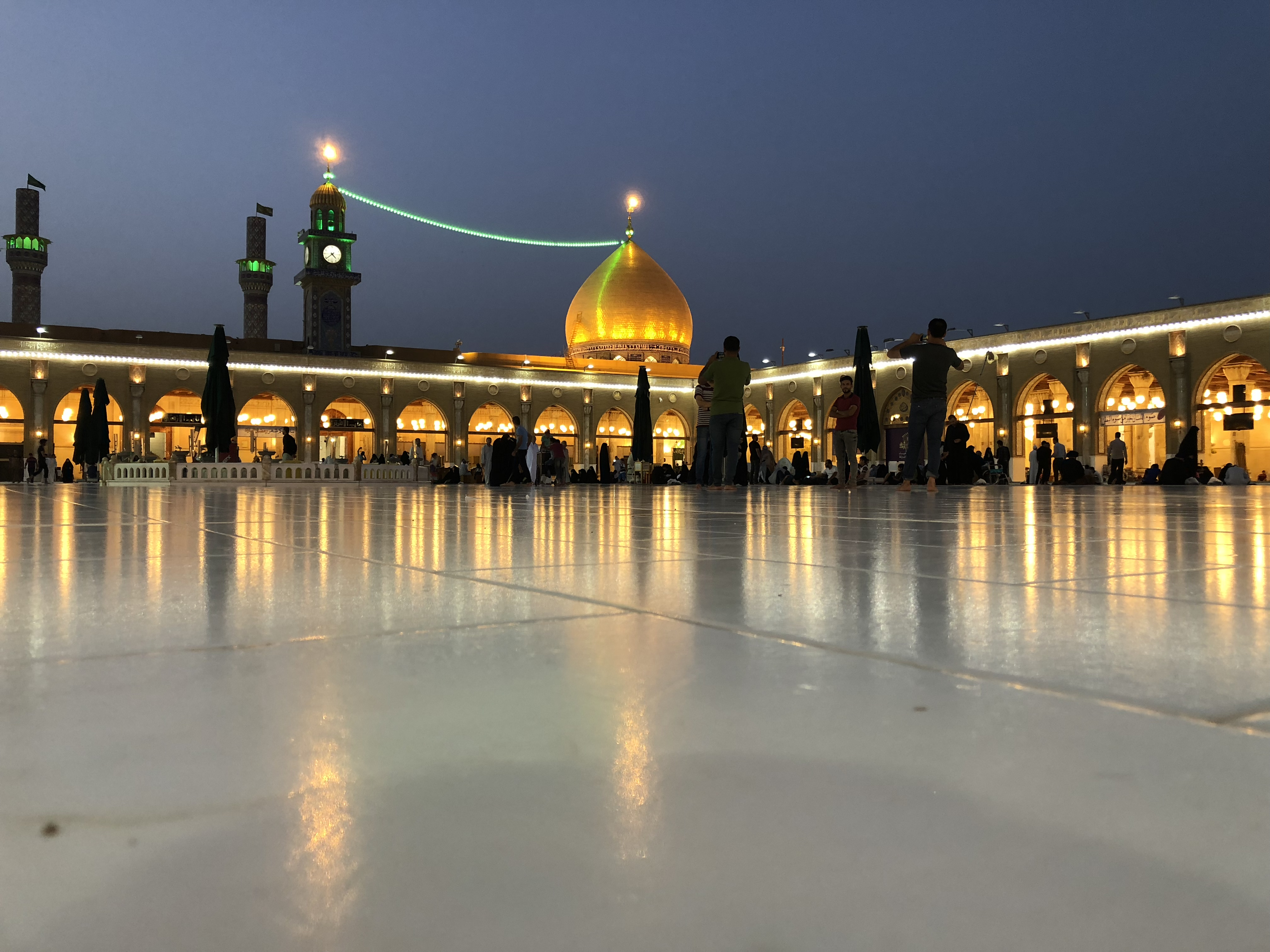
- Top-bottom, L-R: Imam Ali Shrine • Khan al-Nakhilah • Najaf Souk • Khan al-Musalla • Wadi-us-Salaam • Rural Najaf • Al-Sahlah Mosque
- Interactive map of Najaf
- Location of Najaf within Iraq
- Coordinates: 32°00′00″N 44°20′00″E
- Country: Iraq
- Governorate: Najaf
- Established: 791 CE
- Founder: Hārūn al-Rashīd

Government
  - Type: Mayor–council
  - Mayor: Yusuf Kinawi

Area
  - Total: 1,325 km^{2} (512 sq mi)
- Elevation: 60 m (200 ft)

Population
  - Estimate (2018): 747,261
  - Rank: 6th
  - Density: 560/km^{2} (1,500/sq mi)
  - Metro: 988,000
- Time zone: UTC+3

Najaf (Note: (Arabic: ٱلنَّجَف); due to its status as a holy city in Shia Islam, it is also referred to with the honorific name Najaf al-Ashraf (Arabic: ٱلنَّجَف ٱلْأَشْرَف, lit. 'The Most Honourable Najaf').) is the capital city of the eponymous Najaf Governorate in central Iraq, about 160 km (99 mi) south of Baghdad. Its estimated population in 2024 was about 1.41 million people. It is widely considered amongst the holiest cities of Shia Islam and one of its spiritual capitals, as well as the center of Shia political power in Iraq.

It is the burial place of Muhammad's son in law and cousin, ‘Alī ibn Abī Tālib, and thus a major pilgrimage destination for Shia Muslims. The largest cemetery in the world (Wadi-us-Salaam) and the oldest Shi'a Islamic seminary in the world (Hawza of Najaf) are located in Najaf.

== Etymology ==
According to Ibn Manzur, the word, "najaf" (نجف), literally means a high and rectangular place around which water is accumulated, although the water does not go above its level. Al-Shaykh al-Saduq appeals to a hadith from Ja'far al-Sadiq, claiming that "Najaf" comes from the phrase, "nay jaff" which means "the nay sea has dried".

"Najaf" is usually accompanied by the adjective "al-Ashraf" (the dignified). According to the author of al-Hawza al-'ilmiyya fi l-Najaf al-ashraf, this is because 'Ali, one of the most dignified persons, is buried in the city.

Al-Ghari or al-Ghariyyan, Hadd al-'Adhra', al-Hiwar, al-Judi, Wadi l-Salam, al-Zahr, Zahr al-Kufa (behind Kufa), al-Rabwa, Baniqiya, and Mashhad are other names for this land.

== History ==
The area of An-Najaf is located 30 km (19 mi) south of the ancient city of Babylon, and 400 km (248 mi) north of the ancient city of Ur. The city itself was founded in 791 AD, by the Abbasid Caliph Harūn ar-Rashīd, as a shrine to ‘Alī bin Abī Ṭālib.

=== Prehistoric and ancient times ===
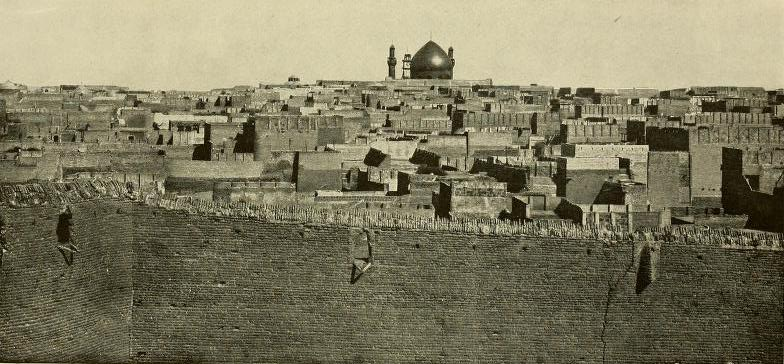
View of the city of Najaf, ca. 1914

Archaeological discoveries show the existence of a people in the present-day Najaf dating back to the 1st century BC. Najaf possesses one of the largest burial grounds in the vicinity for Christians. Discoveries in the following centuries point toward the city's multicultural and diverse religious history. Mohammed al-Mayali, director of Inspectorate Effects of the province of Najaf, states, "the excavation on the graves, which we have been working on for years, confirm that "Najaf" contains the largest Christian cemetery in Iraq, with a cemetery area of 1416 acres. We have found indications of Christianity on the graves through representations of crosses and stones with Christ-like engravings. There are also relics that date back to the Sassanid period. Also discovered in the excavation was proof of a thriving glass industry. Pots were decorated with the cross, as well as Hebrew writings, indicating a community of religious coexistence."

Wadi-us-Salaam in Najaf was once a holy cemetery for Jews and was then called Baniqia, which could be the first recorded name for the area.

The name Baniqia also was found in some texts which state that Abraham once visited and stayed in this village before continuing his journey from Mesopotamia to Arabia.

In Islam, the city is considered to have started with Ali who instructed that his burial place should remain a secret, as he had many enemies and he feared that his body might be subjected to some indignity. According to legend, the body of Ali was placed on a camel which was driven from Kufah. The camel stopped a few miles west of the city where the body was secretly buried. No tomb was raised and nobody knew of the burial place except for a few trusted people. It is narrated that more than a hundred years later the Abbasid Caliph, Harun al-Rashid, went deer hunting outside Kufah, and the deer sought sanctuary at a place where the hounds would not pursue it. On inquiry as to why the place was a sanctuary, he was told that it was the burial place of ‘Ali. Harūn ar-Rashīd ordered a mausoleum to be built on the spot and in due course the town of Najaf grew around the mausoleum.

=== Medieval and modern history ===
In early 14th century, Sheikh Ibn Battuta visited the burial site of Ali ibn Abi Talib during his travels in Iraq after his pilgrimage to Mecca. During this period, Najaf was called Meshhed Ali. As Translated by Samuel Lee, Ibn Battuta in his Arabic Rihla relates:

We next proceeded to the city of Meshhed Ali where the grave of Ali ibn Abu Talib is thought to be. It is a handsome place and well peopled. There is no governor here, except a sort of tribune. The inhabitants consist chiefly of rich and brave merchants. About the gardens are plastered walls adorned with paintings, and within them are carpets, couches and lamps of gold and silver. Within the city is a large treasury kept by the tribune, which arises from the votive offerings arrived from different parts: for when anyone happens to be ill, or suffer under any infirmity, he will make a vow, and thence receive relief. The garden is also famous for its miracles; and hence it is believed that the grave of Ali is there.
Of these miracles, the "night of revival" is one: for, on the 17th day of the month Rejeb, cripples come from different parts of Fars, Room, Khorasaan, Irak, and other places, assemble in companies from twenty to thirty in number. They are placed over the grave soon after sun-set. People then, some praying, some reciting the Quran, and others prostrating themselves, wait expecting their recovery and rising, when about the night, they all get up sound and right. This is a matter well known among them: I heard it from a creditable person, but was not present at one of those nights. I saw, however, several such afflicted persons, who had not yet received, but were looking forward for the advantages of this "night of revival".

In the 16th century, Najaf was conquered by the Ottomans, and became part of Ottoman Iraq. The Safavid dynasty of Iran maintained continuous interest to this Shia site. During the Ottoman–Safavid War (1623–1639), they were twice able to capture the city, but lost it again to the Ottomans in 1638.

Under the rule of the Ottoman Empire, Najaf experienced severe difficulties as the result of repeated raids by Arab desert tribes and the Persian army with acute water shortages causing lack of a reliable water supply. The number of inhabited houses in the city had plummeted from 3,000 to just 30 by the start of the 16th century.

When the Portuguese traveller Pedro Texeira passed through Najaf in 1604, he found the city in ruins, inhabited by little more than 500 people. This was largely the result of a change in the course of the Euphrates river eastwards in the direction of Hilla, leaving Najaf and Kufa high and dry, leading to the destruction of the local formerly rich agriculture, demise of the palm groves and orchards, followed by the salinization of the underground water due to evaporation.

During the 18th century, the scholarly life of Najaf came to be dominated by Farsi-speaking ‘Ulema’ (Arabic: عُلُمَاء, Scholars) from Iran.

The water shortages were finally resolved in 1803 when the Euphrates made its way to the city once again. The shift in the river's flow was the product of a century-long effort by the Ottomans to shift the flow of the river, so as to deprive marsh-dwelling tribes like the Khaza'il of the watery environment that allowed them to evade state control. These long-term efforts rendered successful the construction of the Hindiyya Canal in 1793, which further shifted the flow of the Euphrates. These hydrological shifts were to have religious implications. Most notable was the consolidation and spread of Shi'ism. As the shrine city of Najaf gained access to water again, its notables and holy men began to wield considerable power in the area. In 1811, the last city wall was rebuilt.

=== Modern period ===
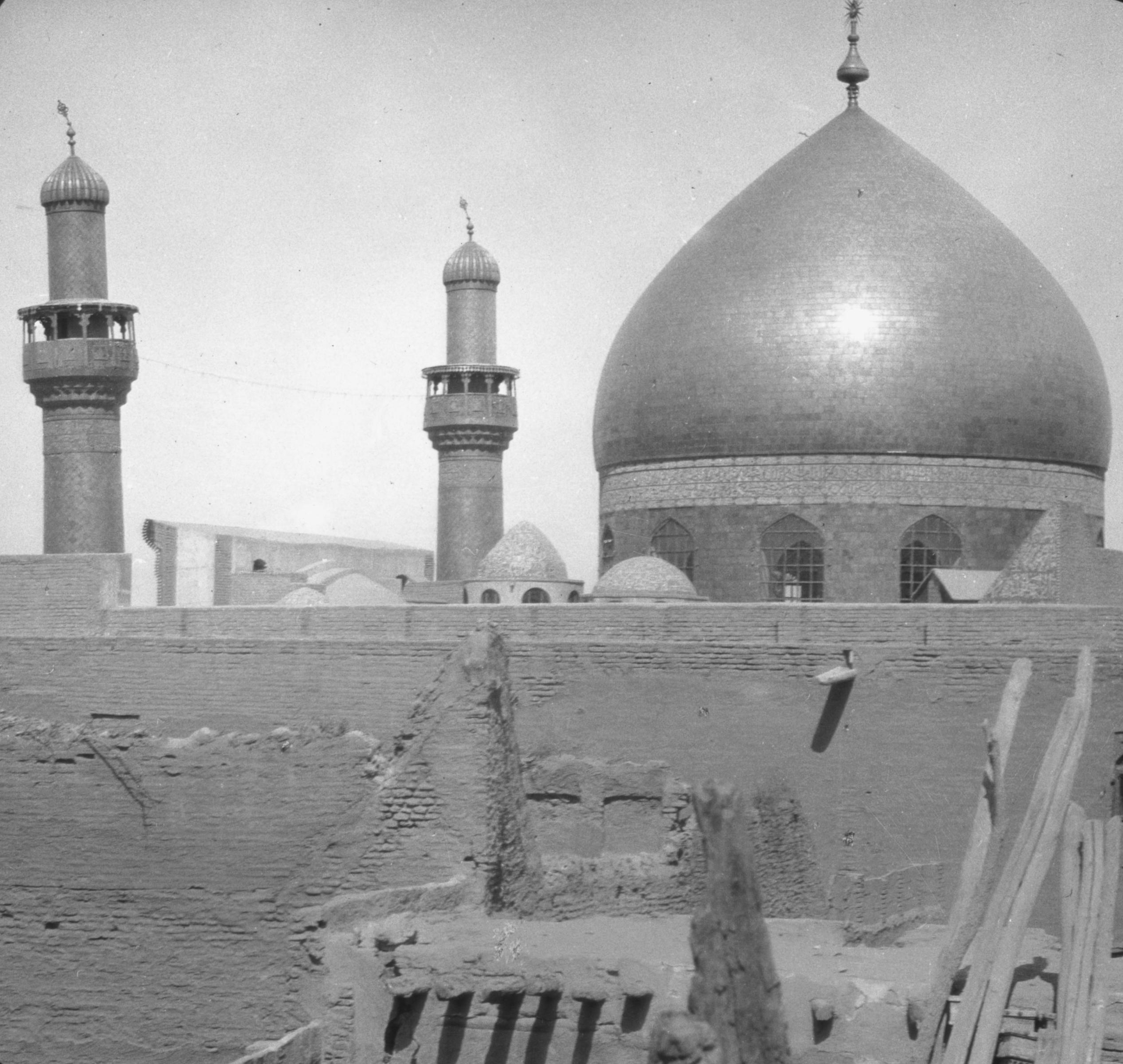
Imam Ali Shrine in 1932.

The Ottomans were expelled in an uprising in 1915, following which the city fell under the rule of the British Empire. The sheikhs of Najaf including Sayyed Mahdi Al-Awadi rebelled in 1918, killing the British governor of the city, and cutting off grain supplies to the Anazzah, a tribe allied with the British. In retaliation the British besieged the city and cut off its water supply. The rebellion was put down and the rule of the sheikhs was forcibly ended. A great number of the Shi‘i ‘Ulema’ were expelled into Persia, where they set the foundations for the rise of the city of Qom as the center of the Shi‘ite learning and authority, in lieu of Najaf. Najaf lost its religious primacy to Qom, and was not to regain it until the 21st century, during the establishment of a Shī‘ī-majority government in Iraq after 2003.

In the 20th century, much of the Old City was rebuilt in a series of modernization initiatives. Beginning in the 1950s, many historic buildings and monuments, including those adjoining the shrine, were demolished for the construction of Sadeq, Zainulabidin, Rasool and Tousi streets. In 1958, the city wall was torn down and replaced with a ring road. In the 1980s, the entire area between the shrine and the city's western edge was demolished, and the residents resettled outside the city, in what locals perceived as a government reprisal for the Shia uprising under the leadership of Muhammad Baqir al-Sadr, who was based in the neighborhood.

During the 2003 U.S. invasion of Iraq, Najaf was a key target of the invading United States Armed Forces. The city was encircled during heavy fighting on 26 March 2003 and was captured on 3 April 2003 (Battle of Najaf). The clerical authorities of the Shī‘ī enclave of Sadr City in Baghdad, which claimed autonomy in April 2003, after the fall of Baghdad, claimed to be taking their orders from senior clerics in Najaf.

On 4 April 2004, the Mahdi Army attacked the Spanish-Salvadoran-ALARNG base (Camp Golf, later renamed Camp Baker) in An Najaf, part of a coordinated uprising across central and southern Iraq in an apparent attempt to seize control of the country ahead of the 30 June 2004 handover of power to a new Iraqi government. This uprising led to the American troops arriving in the city in the wake of the Spanish withdrawal. In August 2004, heavy fighting broke out again between U.S. forces and Al-Sadr's Mahdi Army. The battle lasted three weeks and ended when senior Iraqi cleric Grand Ayatollah Ali al-Sistani negotiated an end to the battle.

In 2012, Najaf was named the Cultural Centre of the Arab World. On 6 March 2021, Pope Francis visited Najaf during his historic papal visit to Iraq and held an interfaith dialogue with al-Sistani, where he expressed a message of peaceful coexistence between Muslims and Christians in the country. During the ISIS war, Najaf Shiites launched solidarity initiative with Sunni areas affected by ISIS. Many Iraqis including religious minorities such as Christians from the north, as well as Lebanese Shia have found safe haven in the city.

== Geography ==
=== Climate ===
Najaf has a hot arid climate, BWh in the Köppen climate classification, with long, very hot summers and mild winters. The average annual temperature is 23.6 °C (74.5 °F). Annual rainfall averages 93 millimetres or 3.7 inches.

Climate data for Najaf (1991–2020)
Month	Jan	Feb	Mar	Apr	May	Jun	Jul	Aug	Sep	Oct	Nov	Dec	Year
Record high °C (°F)	26.0 (78.8)	32.5 (90.5)	41.7 (107.1)	43.0 (109.4)	48.3 (118.9)	51.4 (124.5)	51.5 (124.7)	51.0 (123.8)	49.2 (120.6)	43.7 (110.7)	34.5 (94.1)	29.4 (84.9)	51.5 (124.7)
Mean daily maximum °C (°F)	17.1 (62.8)	20.2 (68.4)	25.6 (78.1)	31.6 (88.9)	38.5 (101.3)	43.2 (109.8)	45.4 (113.7)	45.2 (113.4)	41.4 (106.5)	34.8 (94.6)	24.6 (76.3)	18.7 (65.7)	32.2 (90.0)
Daily mean °C (°F)	11.2 (52.2)	14.0 (57.2)	18.8 (65.8)	24.9 (76.8)	31.3 (88.3)	35.8 (96.4)	38.1 (100.6)	37.6 (99.7)	33.4 (92.1)	28.5 (83.3)	18.0 (64.4)	12.8 (55.0)	25.4 (77.7)
Mean daily minimum °C (°F)	6.3 (43.3)	8.3 (46.9)	12.6 (54.7)	18.2 (64.8)	23.9 (75.0)	27.7 (81.9)	29.9 (85.8)	29.4 (84.9)	25.8 (78.4)	20.4 (68.7)	12.6 (54.7)	7.8 (46.0)	18.6 (65.5)
Record low °C (°F)	−7.2 (19.0)	−4.5 (23.9)	2.2 (36.0)	7.0 (44.6)	13.0 (55.4)	17.0 (62.6)	19.4 (66.9)	22.2 (72.0)	18.3 (64.9)	7.0 (44.6)	0.2 (32.4)	−2.5 (27.5)	−7.2 (19.0)
Average rainfall mm (inches)	16.4 (0.65)	10.7 (0.42)	9.1 (0.36)	14.4 (0.57)	3.4 (0.13)	0.0 (0.0)	0.0 (0.0)	0.0 (0.0)	0.0 (0.0)	6.3 (0.25)	19.6 (0.77)	12.9 (0.51)	92.8 (3.65)
Average relative humidity (%)	67.0	57.6	47.4	41.1	31.4	24.5	22.6	23.7	28.8	39.9	56.5	65.3	42.2
Source: NOAA, Meteomanz(record high since 2009)

== Religious significance ==
An-Najaf is considered sacred by Shi'a Muslims. An-Najaf is renowned as the site of the burial place of Muhammad's son-in-law and cousin, ‘Alī ibn Abī Tālib. The city is now a center of pilgrimage throughout the Shi'ite Islamic world. It is estimated that only Mecca and Medina receive more Muslim pilgrims. As the burial site of one of Shi'a Islam's most important figure, the Imam Ali Mosque is considered by Shiites as the third holiest Islamic site.

The Imam ‘Ali Mosque is housed in a grand structure with a gold gilded dome and many precious objects in the walls. Nearby is the Wadi-us-Salaam cemetery, the largest in the world. It contains the tombs of several prophets and many of the devout from around the world aspire to be buried there, to be raised from the dead with Imām ‘Alī on Judgement Day. Over the centuries, numerous hospices, schools, libraries and convents were built around the shrine to make the city the center of Shīʻa learning and theology.

The An-Najaf seminary, or Hawza Najaf, is one of the most important teaching centres in the Islamic world. Ayatollah Khomeini lectured there from 1965 to 1978. Many of the leading figures of the new Islamic movement that emerged in Iraq, Iran and Lebanon in the 1970s had studied at Najaf. As of 2014, it was estimated to have about 13,000 students.

== Economy ==
The fall of the Ba'athist regime ended restrictions on Shi'ite pilgrimage, which led to a pilgrimage boom in Najaf and increased demand for facilities and infrastructure. In 2006, the government sponsored reconstruction of the previously demolished western area of the city as the City of Pilgrims project. Najaf, alongside Karbala, is considered a thriving pilgrimage destination for Shia Muslims and the pilgrimage industry in the city boomed after the end of Saddam Hussein's rule. However, due to the U.S. sanctions on Iran, the number of Iranian pilgrims dropped significantly.

Since the end of the 2003–2011 war, numerous projects have been proposed for Najaf. The city has become a model for development in Iraq. Najaf have been experiencing economic boom, along with political events. In 2008, over 50% of about licensed 200 investment projects totaling $8 billion were under construction in Najaf Governorate, with most development coming in the housing and tourism sectors. Najaf has been described as a strategically important city with a stable investment environment and available skilled manpower. The city has experienced an increase in investment. Saudi Arabian firm ACWA Power is in process to construct a 1,000 MW solar power plant in Najaf.

The government proposed to build 15 housing complexes in Najaf, with a cost of $7 billion as a part of 240 projects. It also includes development of two industrial parks. In 2024, prime minister Mohammed Shia' Al Sudani announced several projects in the city, during his visit to Najaf. The projects proposed by Al-Sudani included the Holy shrine's carpet-washing factory project will cost 3.46 billion. A cement bag factory covering an area of 75,000 square meters with a production capacity of 240 million bags per year, is being constructed in Najaf. Another project is a glass production factory, which will have a net profit of 32% in the first year of operation because the Najaf desert region has high-quality raw materials for this factory.

Markets in Najaf

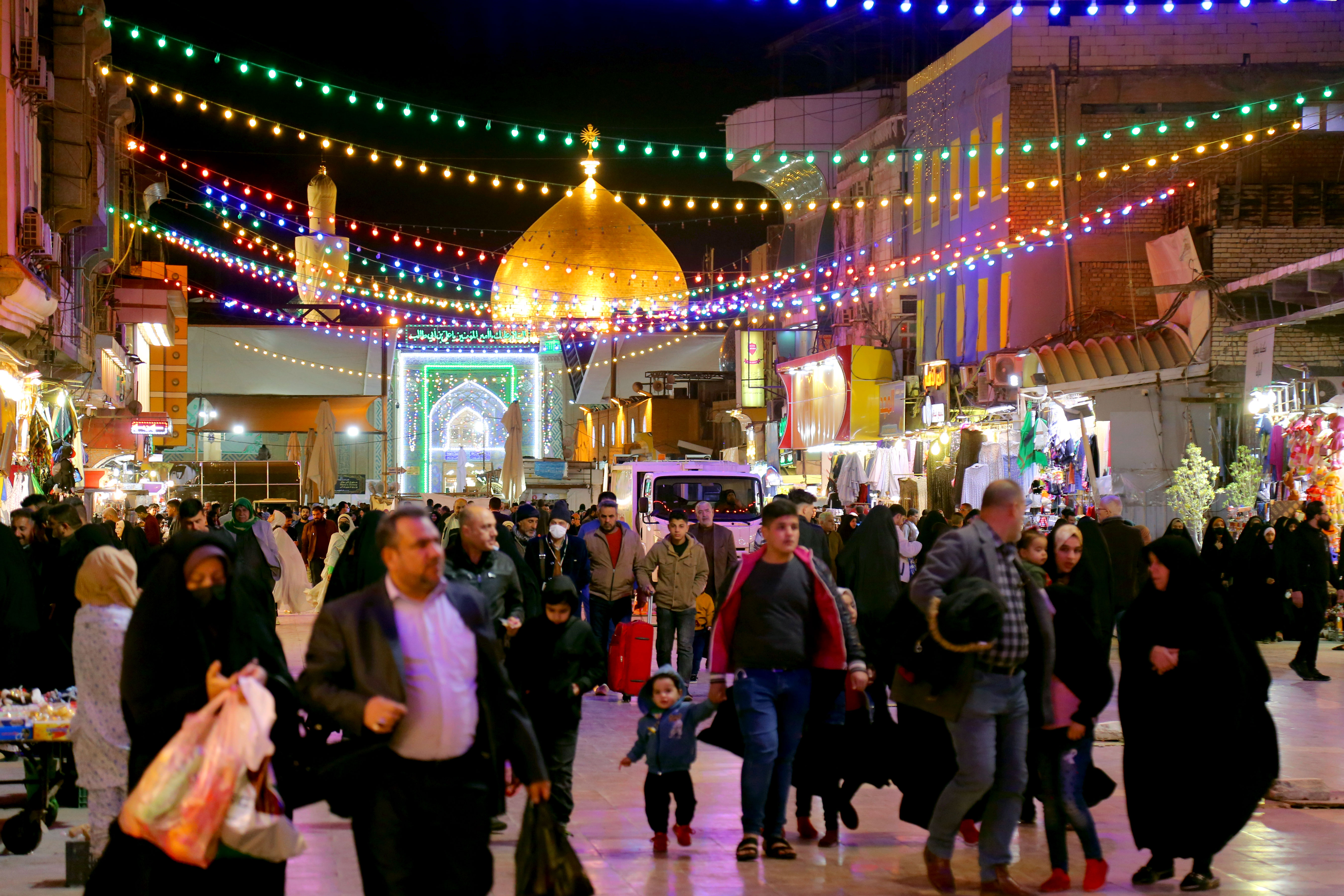

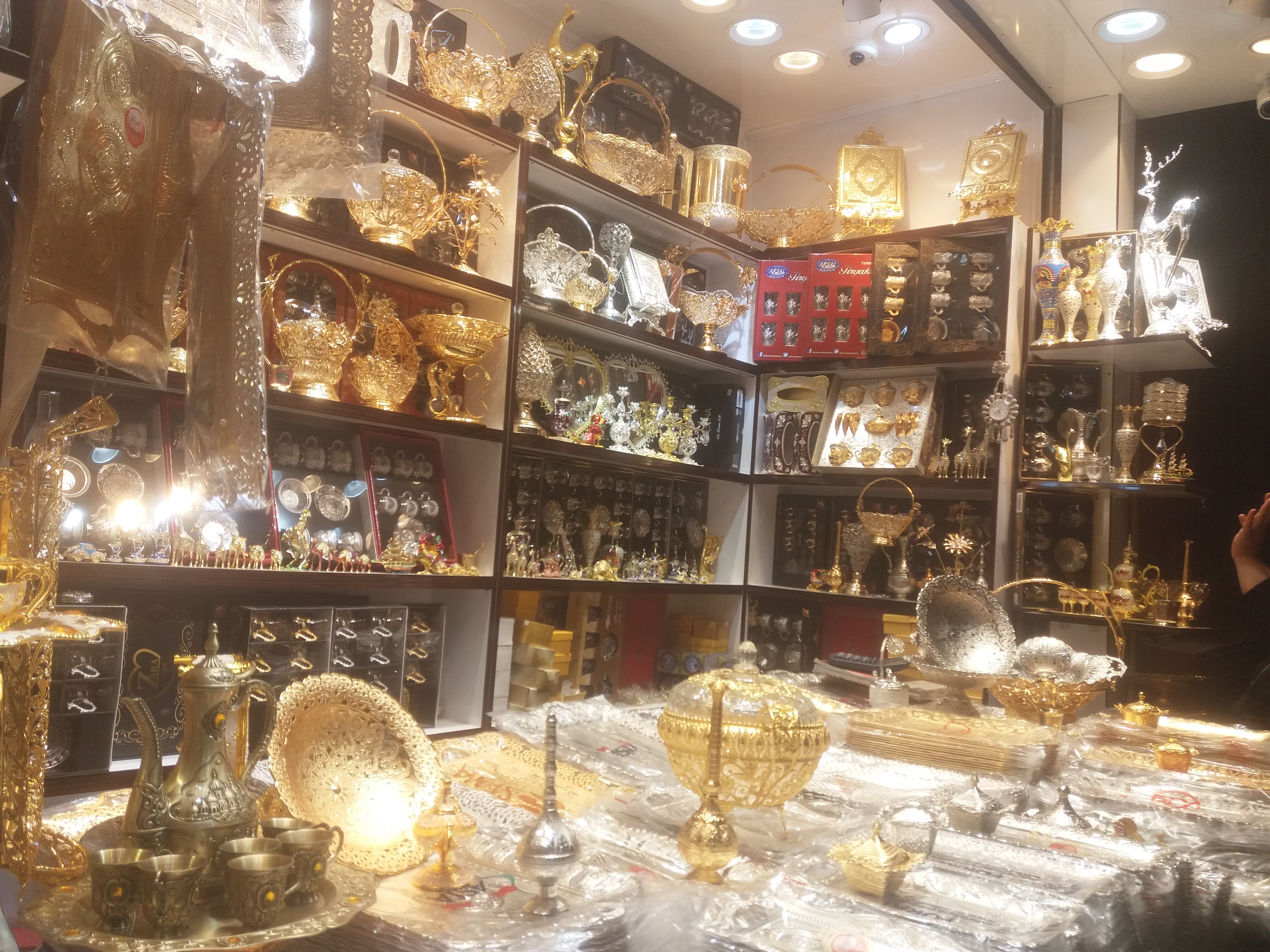

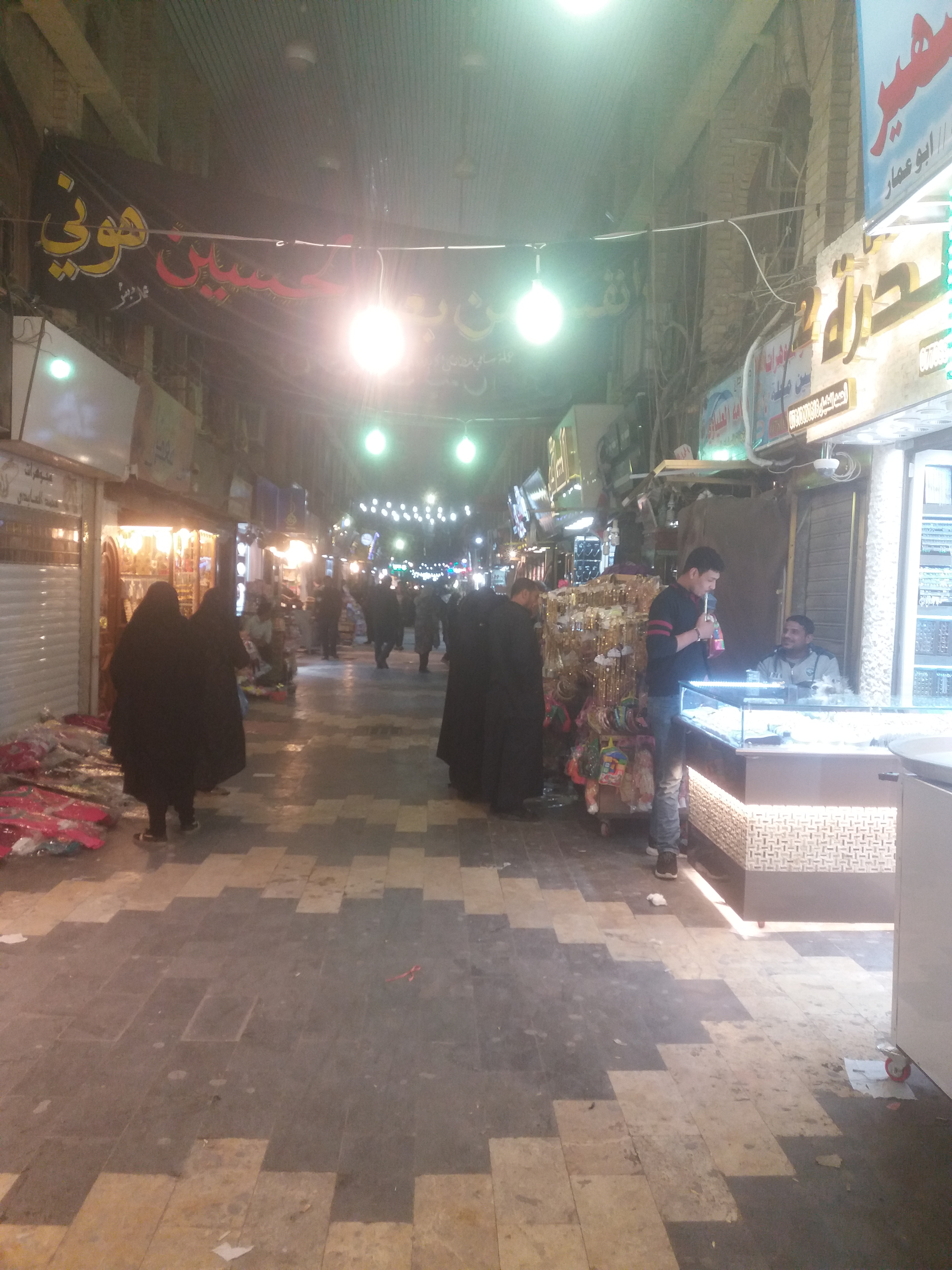

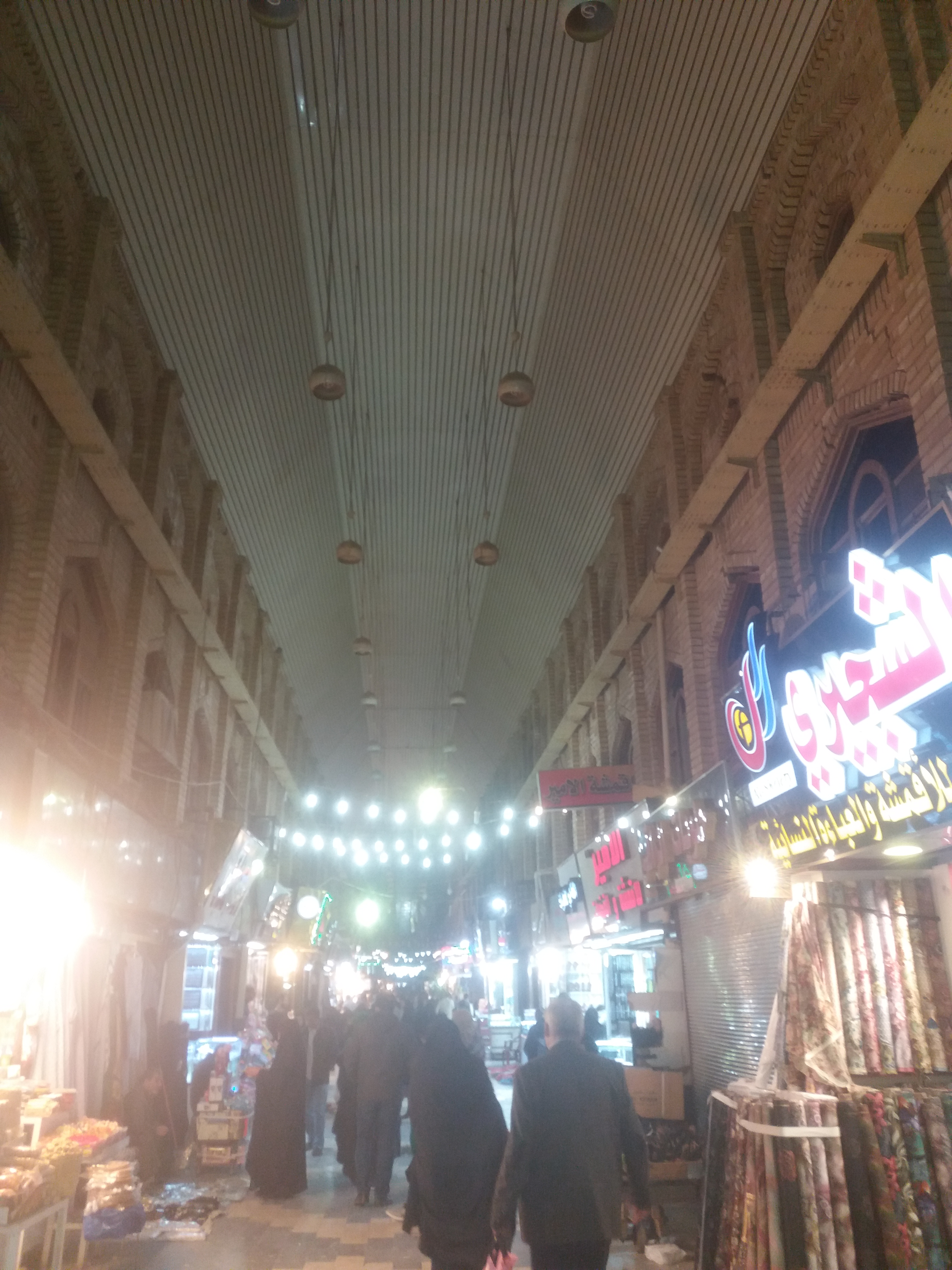

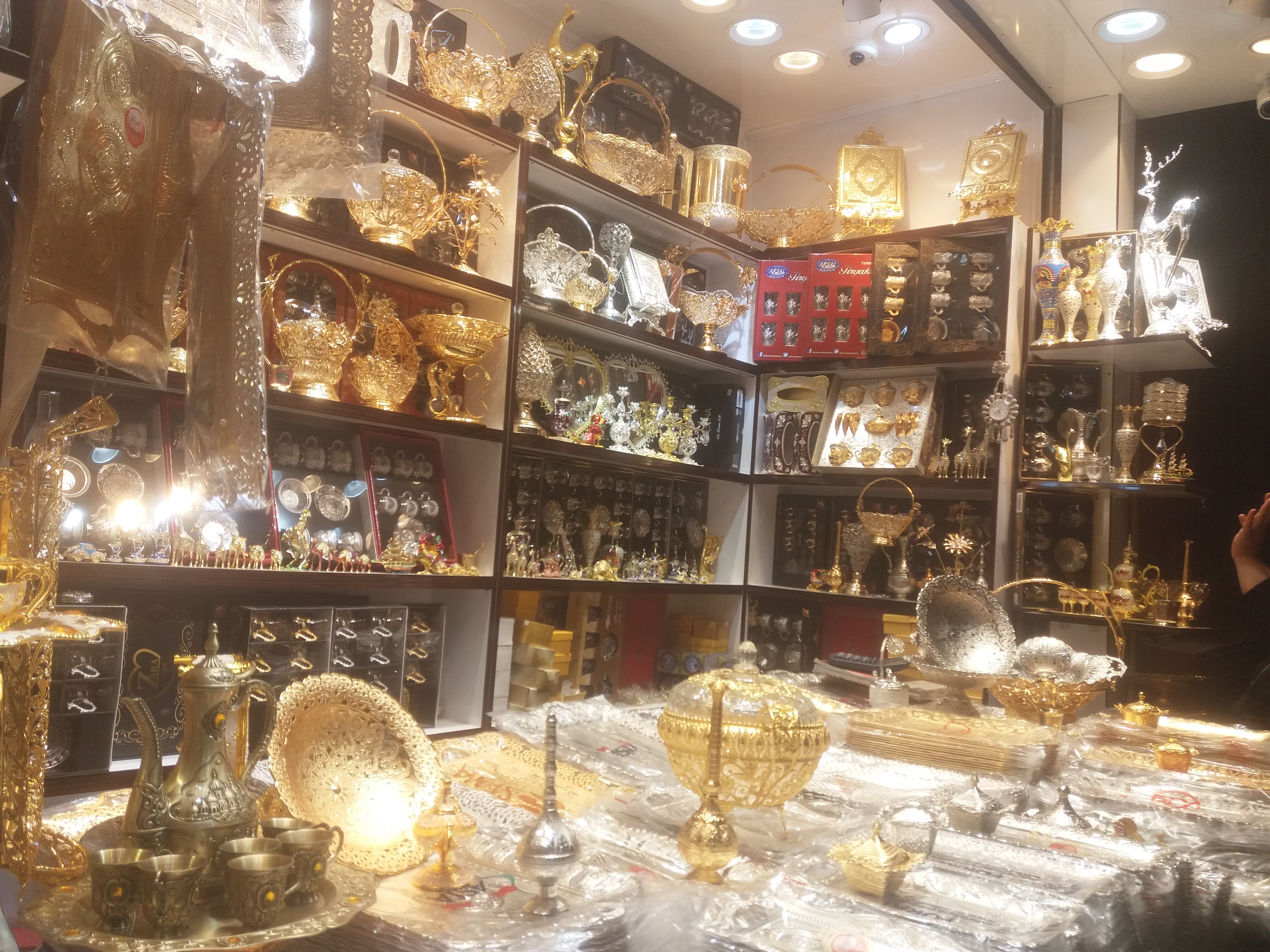

== Culture ==
=== Religious tourism ===
Najaf being home to the Sanctuary of Imam Ali (considered the patriarch and the first of the Twelve Imams) is the destination of large numbers of Shi’i religious pilgrims annually hailing from around the world.

=== Sports ===
The city of Najaf is home to Al-Najaf SC and Naft Al-Wasat SC that play in the premier Iraq Stars League, and the second tier Iraqi Premier Division League, respectively.

Najaf has two football stadiums, the An-Najaf Stadium (also referred to as the old stadium) with a capacity of 12,000 spectators, and the newer Al-Najaf International Stadium with a capacity of 30,000. The latter stadium is the home of the Stars League club Al-Najaf as well as Naft Al-Wasat, whilst the former is the home stadium of the neighbouring Al-Kufa SC.

== Education ==
=== Universities ===
Some of the universities located in Najaf include:

- Al-Furat Al-Awsat Technical University
- Islamic University College
- University of Alkafeel
- Jabir Ibn Hayyan Medical University
- Altoosi University College

=== Najaf Seminary ===
The Hawza of Najaf has been a centre of traditional Shia Islamic education since the 11th century CE. It was possibly established in the 9th century CE, making it the oldest Shi’i seminary among those still active, and many prominent Shi’i Islamic scholars have studied in the Najaf Seminary, including Murtadha al-Ansari, and Ali al-Sistani.

== Infrastructure ==
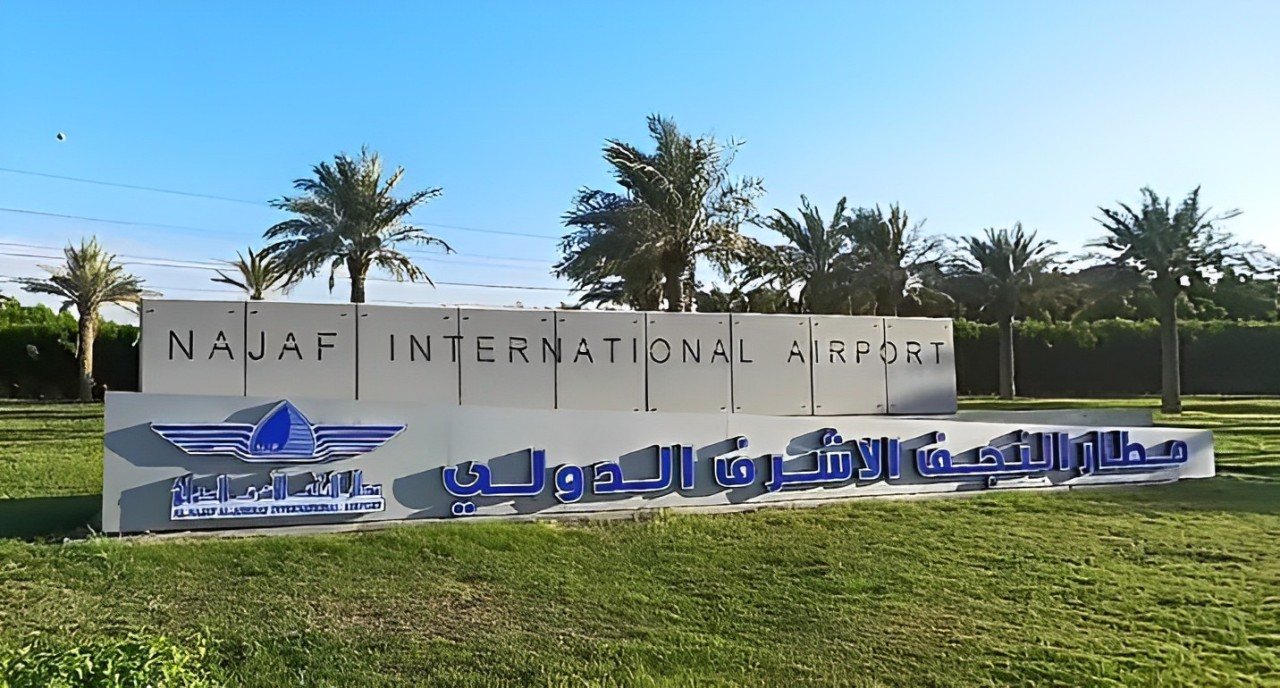
Najaf Airport, 2013

Najaf International Airport is an important logistical hub that plays a pivotal role in facilitating transportation, particularly for religious tourism. Annually, it oversees the transit of over 3 million passengers, predominantly pilgrims visiting the holy sites in Najaf. It is situated in the eastern part of Najaf, approximately 6 kilometres from the city center.

In February 2024, the Iraqi National Investment Commission (NIC) unveiled a project to construct an inter-city high-speed rail connecting the cities of Najaf and Karbala. Once finished, it is set to accommodate up to 25,000 passengers per hour.

The construction of a road between Iraq and Saudi Arabia around the region of Najaf is about to complete.

== International relations ==
=== Sister cities ===
As of 2024, Najaf has three sister cities:

- Minneapolis, United States
- Najafabad, Iran

== See also ==
- 1977 Shia protests in Iraq
- Al-Hannanah mosque
- Al Najaf International Airport
- Battle of Najaf (2003)
- Battle of Najaf (2004)
- Battle of Najaf (2007)
- Big Four (Najaf)
- Literary League Association
