= Literary League Association =

The Literary League Association (Arabic: جمعية الرابطة الأدبية) was a political and cultural organization in Iraq. The party was founded in Najaf in 1932. Its president was Sheikh Mohammed Ali Al-Yacubi. The Association was particularly active during the May 1941 revolution.
