= Mizban Khadr al-Hadi =

Iraqi military officer (1938–2020)

- مزبان خضر الهادي

Member of the Revolutionary Command Council
- In office 1991–2001

Personal details
- Born: 1938 Mandali District, Diyala, Iraq
- Died: 16 May 2020 (aged 81–82) Nasiriyah Central Prison, Iraq

Military service
- Allegiance: Iraq
- Battles/wars: 2003 invasion of Iraq: Najaf; Samawah

Mizban Khadr al-Hadi (Arabic: مزبان خضر الهادي; 1938 - 16 May 2020) was an Iraqi general and politician. He served as a member of the Revolutionary Command Council from 1991 to 2001.

== Biography ==
Hadi was born in 1938 in Mandali District, in what is now Diyala Governorate. Hadi was extremely close to Saddam Hussein, serving as a key advisor since the early 1980s, particularly on Shiite affairs. He was made a Minister without portfolio in June 1982, after previously having served as Governor of Najaf.

Hadi was decorated by Saddam Hussein for his role in both the Gulf War and the subsequent 1991 uprisings in Iraq. Due to his close links to Saddam Hussein, Hadi was elevated in March 2003 to command the central Euphrates region; one of Iraq's four military regions during the 2003 invasion of Iraq. Hadi was no. 23, "the nine of hearts", on the US-led coalition's deck of most-wanted Iraqi playing cards.

Hadi was reported to have had been arrested by US Forces in Baghdad on 1 May 2003. CENTCOM later claimed that Hadi was arrested on 8 July 2003 after turning himself in to Coalition forces in Baghdad.

Hadi died on 16 May 2020, due to a terminal illness in Nasiriyah Central Prison.
