= Battle of Samawah =

Battle in the US-Iraq war

Coordinates: 31.3167°N 45.2833°E

- Part of 2003 Invasion of Iraq
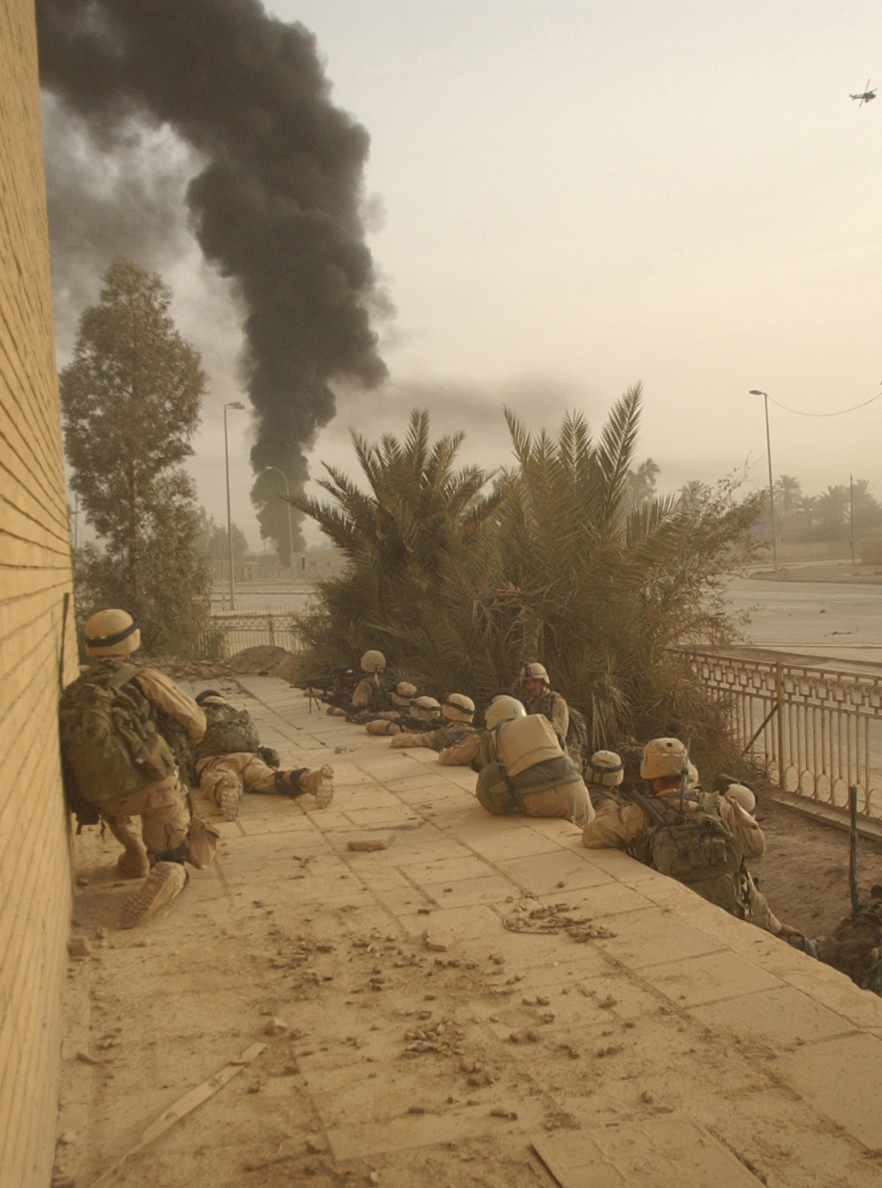
- Soldiers from Bravo company 2/325th watch an Iraqi paramilitary unit's headquarters burn during an assault on Samawah's north side 4 April 2003.
Date	30 March – 4 April 2003 (5 days)
Location	Samawah, Iraq
Result	United States victory

Belligerents
United States	Ba'athist Iraq

Commanders and leaders
(United States) Gen. Charles Swannack	(Iraq) Lt. Gen. Yahya (Iraq) Mizban Khidar Hadi (Iraq) Yahya Huwaish Fadani (Iraq) Kinan Mansour Khaleel

Strength
2nd Brigade, U.S. 82nd Airborne Division; 1-41st Infantry Regiment; 2-70th Armor Regiment, 1st Armored Division	Elements of the Saddam Fedayeen, Iraqi Republican Guard; Iraqi Army

Casualties and losses
1 killed 6 wounded	46 killed 23 captured

The Battle of Samawah took place during the 2003 invasion of Iraq as American troops fought to clear the city of Iraqi forces. The city had been bypassed during the advance on Baghdad, leaving the task of clearing it to American paratroopers of the 82nd Airborne Division with mechanized infantry and armor provided by units of the 1st Battalion, 41st Infantry Regiment, and 2-70th Armor Battalions, along with 3rd platoon 59th Chemical Company tasked with finding and removing any potential chemical or biological weapons. The battle was the largest sustained urban combat that paratroopers of the 82nd Airborne had been involved in since World War II.

== Before the battle ==
As the U.S. 3rd Infantry Division advanced northwards to Baghdad, they avoided getting bogged down in urban combat by bypassing heavily defended Iraqi towns. Keeping to the south of the Euphrates River, they planned to cross the river directly south of Baghdad, in the Karbala Gap.

Outside of Samawah from 22 – 25 March, the 3rd Infantry Division made contact with Iraqi forces outside Samawah, using artillery and airstrikes. Iraqi forces attacked the American armored columns and were pushed back. It is estimated that 120-200 Iraqis died in this action, in which no Americans were killed.

The city was bypassed and did not seriously impede the 3rd Infantry Division's advance on Baghdad, but irregular forces based inside the city staged attacks on American supply lines. On 25 March, the 2nd Brigade of the 82nd Airborne Division received the order to clear Samawah and by 28 March they had re-deployed to Talil Air Base in southern Iraq.

== Battle ==
The 2nd Brigade reached Samawah at 3:00 AM on 30 March, expecting to assault a trench line on the eastern outskirts of the town. Instead, they discovered a sand berm surrounding a landfill, which Bravo Battery 2/319th used as their first artillery position since no enemy forces were defending it. At dawn, the Americans began to advance towards the cement factory and received heavy small arms, mortar, and RPG fire. A sharp firefight developed between the Americans hiding behind the berms in the landfill and railroad track, and the Iraqi forces around the cement factory. An Iraqi sniper fired from the top of the factory's smokestack until an American soldier fired a TOW missile into the smokestack, collapsing the structure. Lacking smoke shells for their mortars in order to screen their movements, American forces were unable to advance and pulled back to the east. OH-58D Kiowa Warrior helicopters arrived and attacked enemy mortar and RPG teams, and destroyed several technical vehicles. At around 3:00 PM, Navy F/A-18 Hornets arrived on station and bombed a warehouse attached to the cement factory. Fighting around the cement factory died down at nightfall.

That night, elements of the 3rd Battalion of the 325th Infantry Regiment launched a feint attack against the bridges in the town over the Euphrates River. The purpose was to draw the attention of Iraqi Republican Guard forces on the other side of the river, preventing them from attacking the 3rd ID's rear areas and fixing their positions so they could be destroyed by American air power. At the start of the assault, A-10 Thunderbolt II attack aircraft and 105 mm M119 howitzers from 2/319th AFAR bombarded the north bank of the Euphrates. Raining smoke and high explosive rounds. 1st Battalion then attacked, seizing the bridges, crossing the river, and establishing a bridgehead on the north bank. Having achieved their objectives, the battalion pulled back at dawn. During this operation, an SUV attempted to run across the bridge at the Americans. After being hit with fire from a .50 caliber machine gun, the vehicle exploded into a fireball. It had been loaded with propane tanks for use as a suicide car bomb.

Snipers and recon forward observers from the 82nd Airborne's 2/319 COLT team located approximately 17 armed combatants staging along the outskirts of Samawah. They radioed for artillery/mortar support and killed most of the insurgents after directing and adjusting fire unto their location (31.303165, 45.307851).

At 7:00 PM on 2 April, Bco 1st Battalion of the 325th Infantry Regiment launched an attack on the cement factory with the support of an AC-130 gunship, and an M1 Abrams Tank. They took the factory unopposed. Over the next two days, 2nd Brigade cleared the rest of the city, securing the south side of the bridges, followed by an assault on the headquarters of an Iraqi paramilitary group on 4 April. Rather than taking and holding ground, the Americans launched probing attacks into the city, engaged enemy forces, and then pulled back. High explosive rounds fired by 2/319th were used against the Ba'ath Party Headquarters, a school used as a headquarters building, and a soccer field used as a rallying point. It was later said there was nothing left standing. A hospital was also being used as a headquarters by Iraqi forces, however this was not bombed due to civilians in the area. By 4 April, resistance had ceased and the city was declared cleared. 1-41 Infantry, 1st Armored Division, and the 2nd Brigade Combat Team, 325th Airborne Infantry Regiment, 82nd Airborne Division would be awarded a Presidential Unit Citation for their performance during combat operations.

== See also ==
- Jason Crow (born 1979), American politician, lawyer, and former U.S. Army officer who led a platoon in this battle
