= Ottoman architecture =

Architecture of the Ottoman Empire

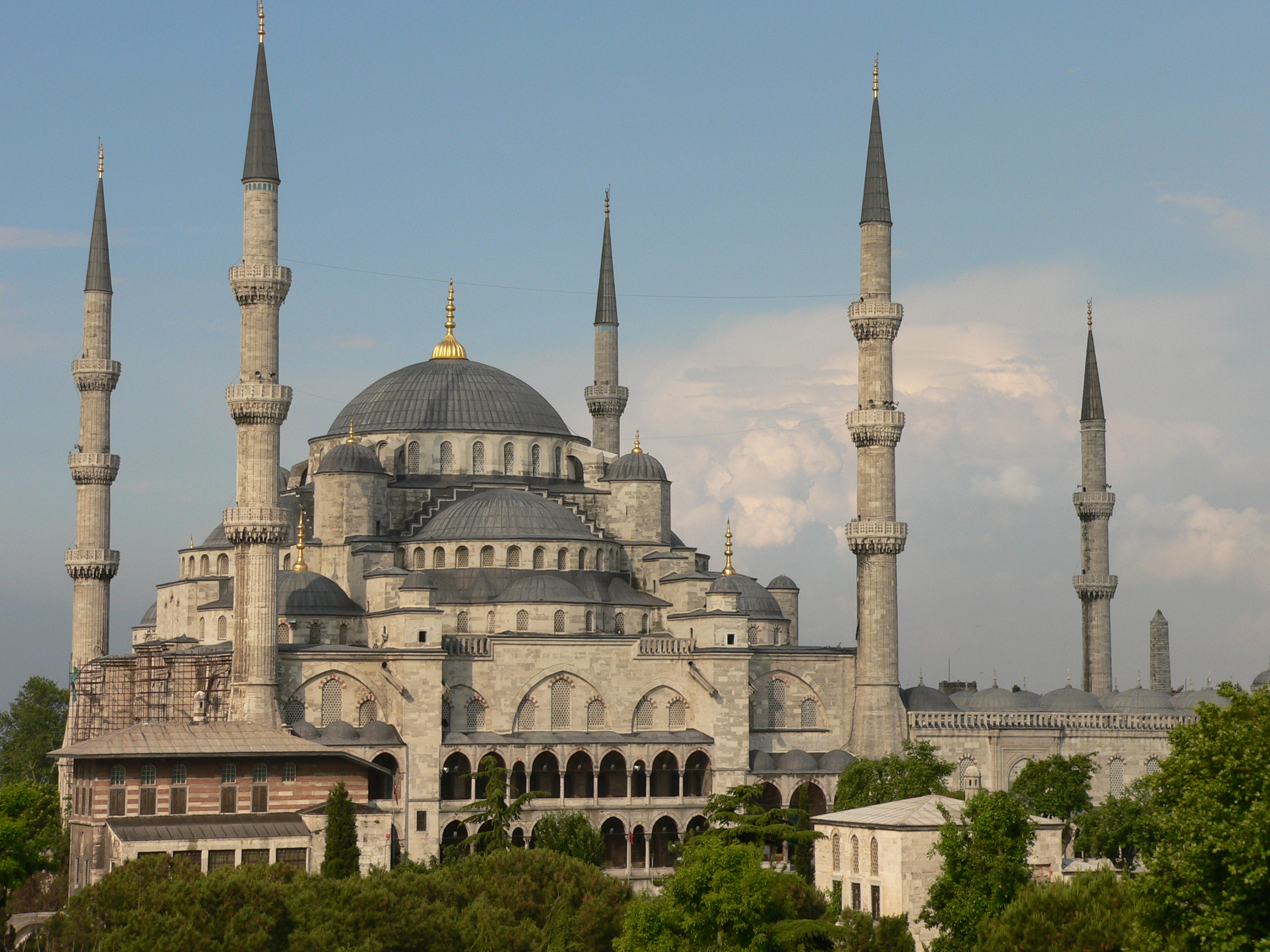
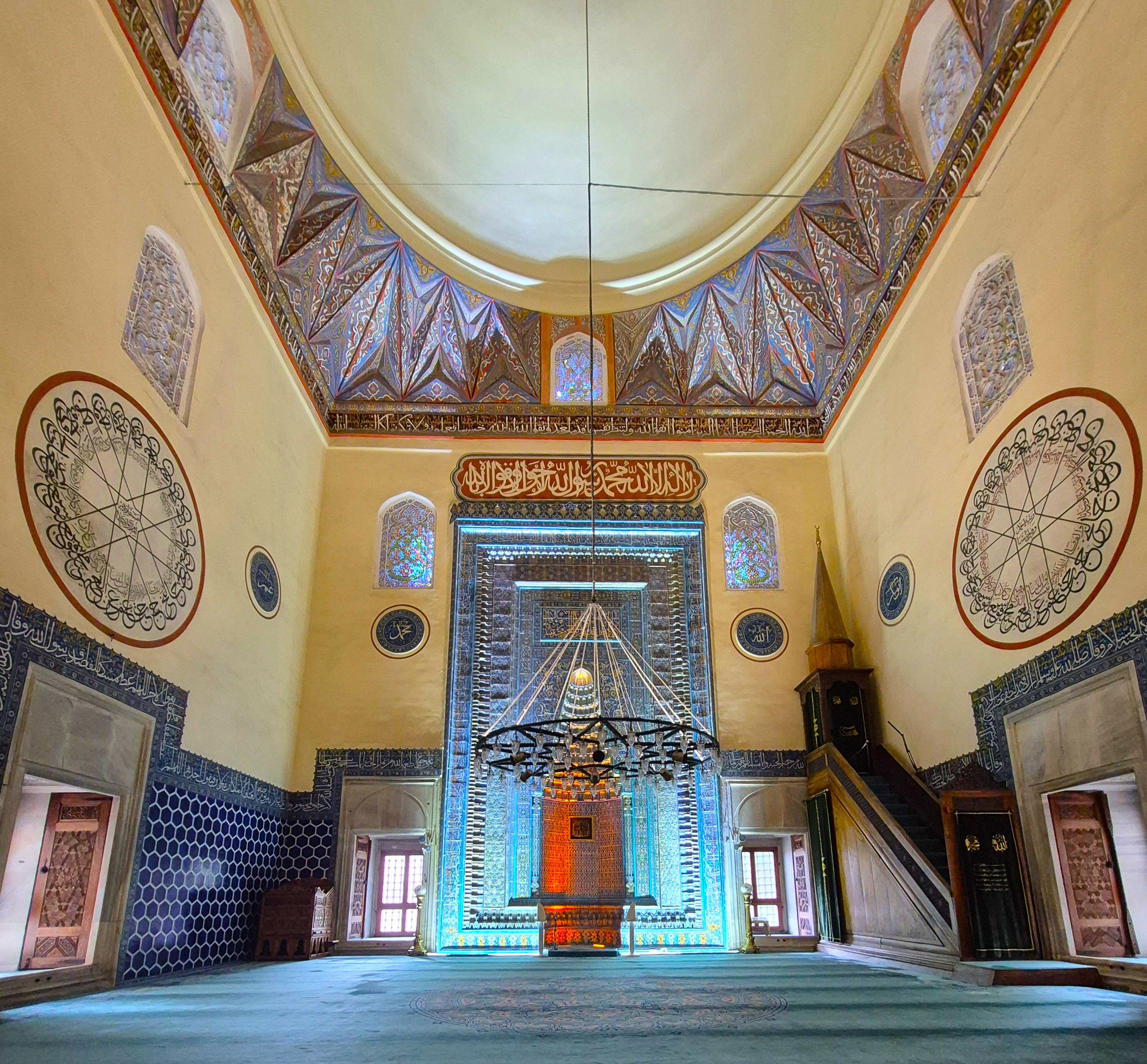
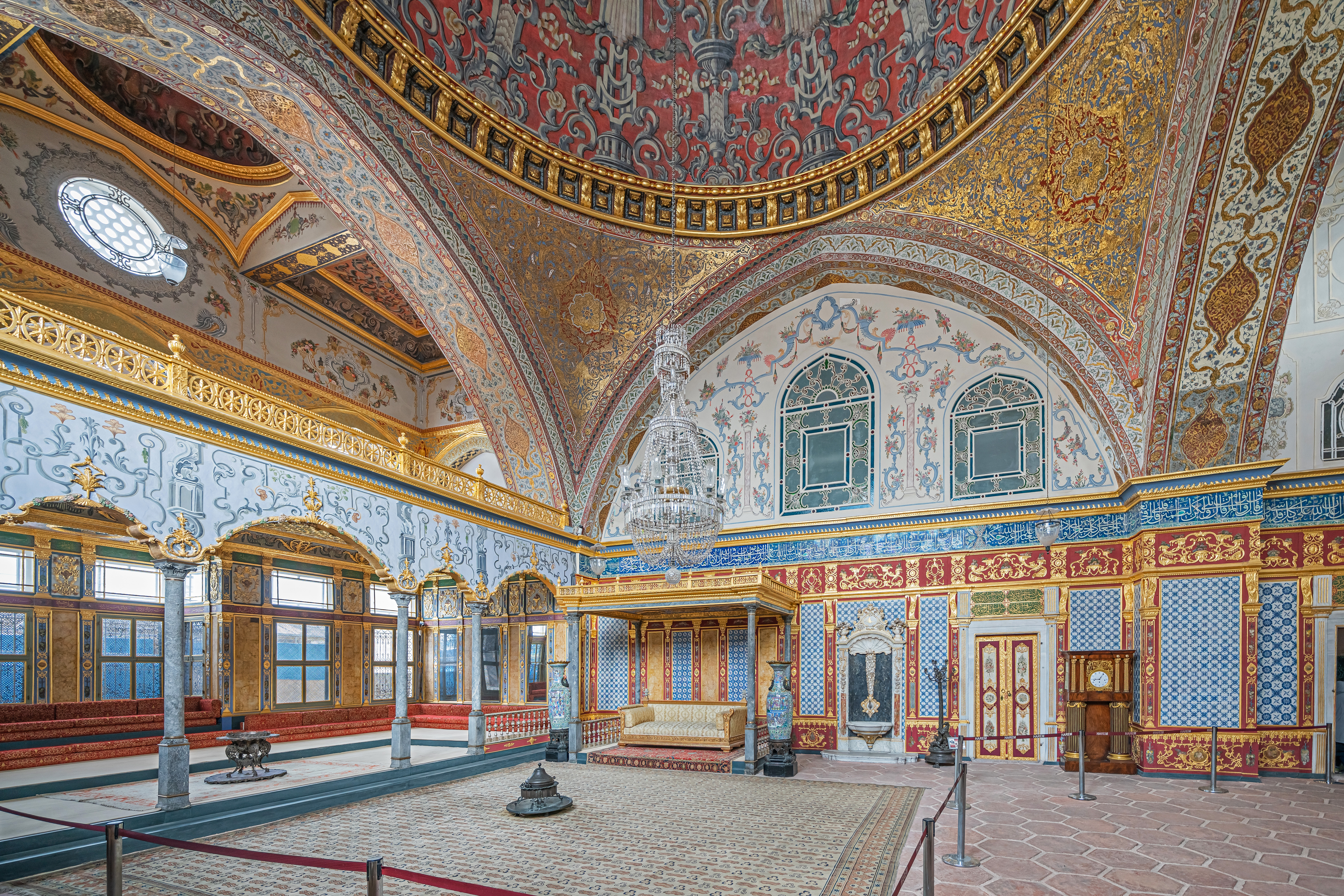
- Top: Sultan Ahmed Mosque in Istanbul, a classical-style mosque (early 17th century); Middle: Interior of Green Mosque, Bursa, an early Ottoman religious complex (14th century); Bottom: Imperial Hall in Topkapı Palace, Istanbul, a 16th-century structure with later Ottoman Baroque decoration (18th century)
- Years active: c. 1300 to 1922 (Note: Some mosques built after 1922 have also imitated the historical Ottoman style. See article for details.)

Ottoman architecture is an architectural style that developed under the Ottoman Empire over a long period, undergoing some significant changes during its history. It began in northwestern Anatolia around the end of the 13th century and developed from earlier Seljuk Turkish architecture, with influences from Byzantine and Iranian architecture along with other architectural traditions in the Middle East. Early Ottoman architecture experimented with multiple building types over the course of the 14th to 15th centuries, progressively evolving into the classical Ottoman style of the 16th and 17th centuries. This style integrated the Ottoman tradition with influences from the Hagia Sophia, resulting in monumental mosque buildings focused around a high central dome with a varying number of semi-domes. The most important architect of the classical period is Mimar Sinan, whose major works include the Şehzade Mosque, Süleymaniye Mosque, and Selimiye Mosque.

Beginning in the 18th century, Ottoman architecture was opened to external influences, particularly Baroque architecture in Western Europe. Changes appeared in the style of the Tulip Period, followed by the emergence of the Ottoman Baroque style in the 1740s. The Nuruosmaniye Mosque is one of the most important examples of this period. The architecture of the 19th century saw more influences imported from Western Europe, brought in by architects such as those from the Balyan family. Empire style and Neoclassical motifs were introduced and a trend towards eclecticism was evident in many types of buildings, such as the Dolmabahçe Palace. The last decades of the Ottoman Empire saw the development of a new Ottoman revivalist style, also known as the First National Architectural Movement, by architects such as Mimar Kemaleddin and Vedat Tek. Since the dissolution of the Ottoman Empire in 1922, the traditional Ottoman style has been imitated in the design of mosques in modern Turkey and occasionally in other countries.

Ottoman dynastic patronage was concentrated in the historic capitals of Bursa, Edirne, and Istanbul (Constantinople), as well as in several other important administrative centers. It was in these centers that most important developments in Ottoman architecture occurred and that the most monumental Ottoman architecture can be found. Ottoman-style constructions were still abundant in the provinces of Anatolia and the Balkans (Rumelia), but in the more distant Middle Eastern and North African provinces older Islamic architectural styles continued to hold strong influence and were sometimes blended with Ottoman styles.

Major religious monuments were typically architectural complexes, known as a külliye, that had multiple components providing different services or amenities. In addition to a mosque, these could include a madrasa, a hammam, an imaret, a sebil, a market, a caravanserai, a primary school, or others. The decoration of Ottoman buildings featured paintwork and carved stonework, drawing on a repertoire of mostly floriate motifs that evolved over time and reflected influences ranging from Timurid art to European Baroque ornamentation. Another important type of decoration was tilework, most notably Iznik tiles, which reached their artistic apogee in the second half of the 16th century.

== Early Ottoman period (14th to 15th centuries) ==
=== Before 1453 ===
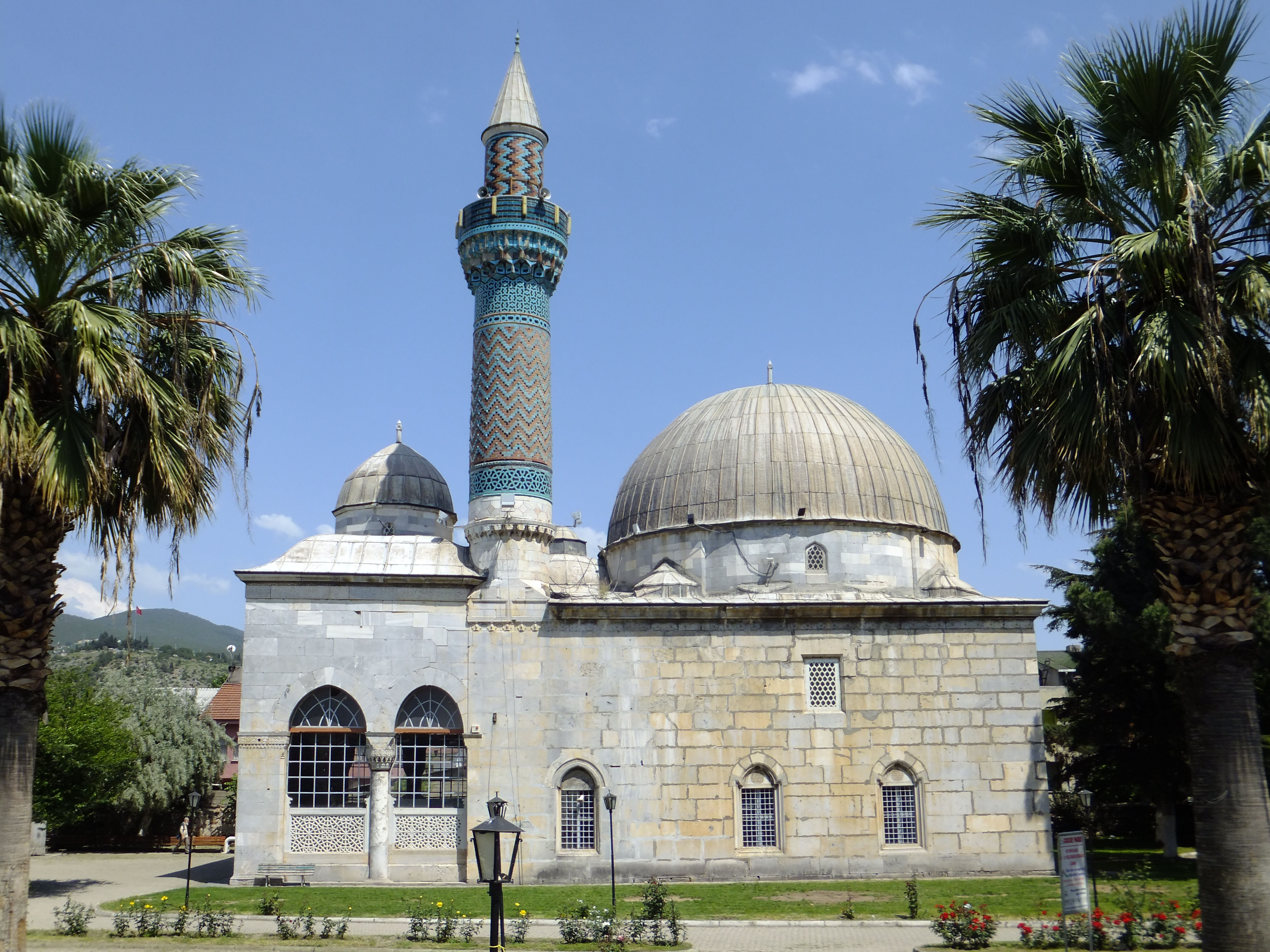
The Green Mosque in İznik (1378–1391) is an early example of the single-domed mosque type. The prayer hall is covered by a large dome (right), while its entrance is preceded by a portico covered by smaller domes (left).

The first Ottomans were established in northwest Anatolia near the borders of the Byzantine Empire. Their position at this frontier encouraged influences from Byzantine architecture and other ancient remains, and there are examples of architectural experimentation under many local Turkish dynasties in the region during this period. One of the early Ottoman stylistic distinctions that emerged was a tradition of designing more complete façades in front of mosques, especially in the form of a portico with arches and columns. Another early distinction was the reliance on domes. The first Ottoman structures were built in Söğüt, the earliest Ottoman capital, and in nearby Bilecik, but they have not survived in their original form. They include a couple of small mosques and a mausoleum built in Ertuğrul's time (late 13th century). Bursa was captured in 1326 by the Ottoman leader Orhan. It served as the Ottoman capital until 1402, becoming a major center of patronage and construction. Orhan also captured İznik in 1331, turning it into another early center of Ottoman art. In this early period there were generally three types of mosques: the single-domed mosque, the T-plan mosque, and the multi-unit or multi-dome mosque.

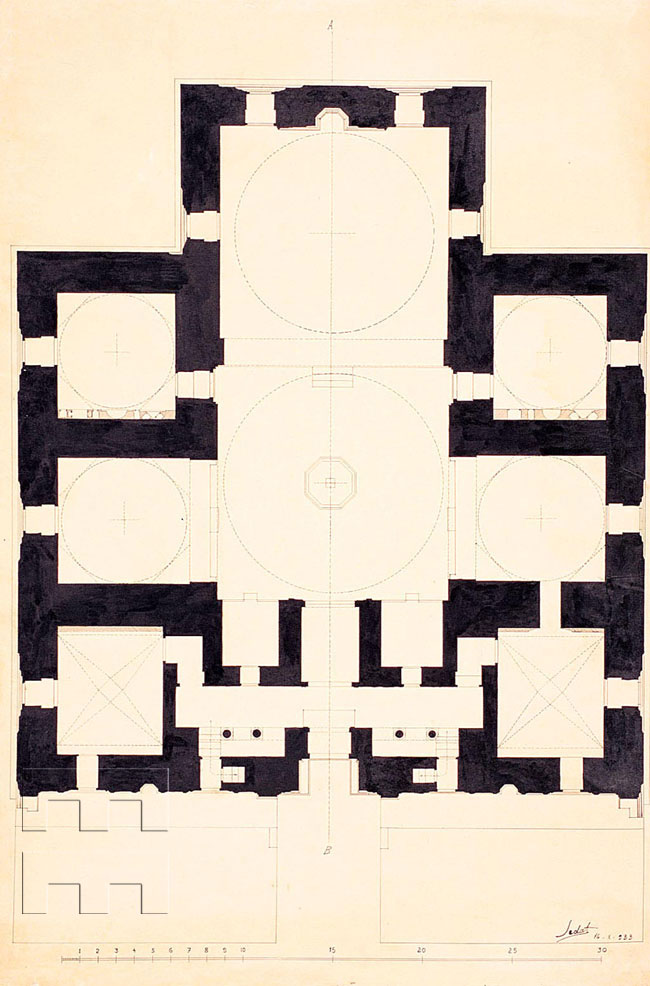
Floor plan of the Green Mosque in Bursa (1412–1424), showing the "T-plan" type: three domed iwans around a central domed space. The larger iwan is aligned with the qibla (top).

The Hacı Özbek Mosque (1333) in İznik is the oldest Ottoman mosque with an inscription that documents its construction and it is the oldest example of the Ottoman single-domed mosque, consisting of a square chamber covered by a dome. Another early single-domed mosque is the Green Mosque in İznik (1378–1391), which is the first Ottoman mosque for which the name of the architect (Hacı bin Musa) is known. The main dome covers a square space and the transition between the round base of the dome and the square chamber below is achieved through a series of triangular carvings known as "Turkish triangles", a type of pendentive which was common in Anatolian Seljuk and early Ottoman architecture.

In 1334–1335, Orhan built a mosque in İznik that no longer stands but has been excavated by archeologists. It is significant as the earliest known example of a type of building called a zaviye (from Arabic zawiya), "T-plan" mosque, or "Bursa-type" mosque. This type of building is characterized by a central court, typically covered by a dome, with iwans (domed or vaulted halls that are open to the courtyard) on three sides, one of which is oriented towards the qibla (direction of prayer) and contains the mihrab (wall niche symbolizing the qibla). The front façade usually incorporated a portico along its entire width. The iwans on the side and the other various rooms attached to these buildings may have served to house Sufi students and traveling dervishes, since the Sufi brotherhoods were one of the main supporters of the early Ottomans. Variations of this floor plan were the most common type of major religious structure sponsored by the early Ottoman elites. The "Bursa-type" label comes from the fact that multiple examples of this kind were built in and around Bursa, including the Orhan Gazi Mosque (1339), the Hüdavendigar (Murad I) Mosque (1366–1385), the Yildirim Bayezid I Mosque (completed in 1395), and the Green Mosque built by Mehmed I (1412–1424). The Green Mosque is notable for its extensive tile decoration in the cuerda seca technique. It is the first instance of lavish tile decoration in Ottoman architecture. These mosques were all part of larger religious complexes (külliyes) that included other structures offering services such as madrasas (Islamic colleges), hammams (public bathhouses), and imarets (charitable kitchens).

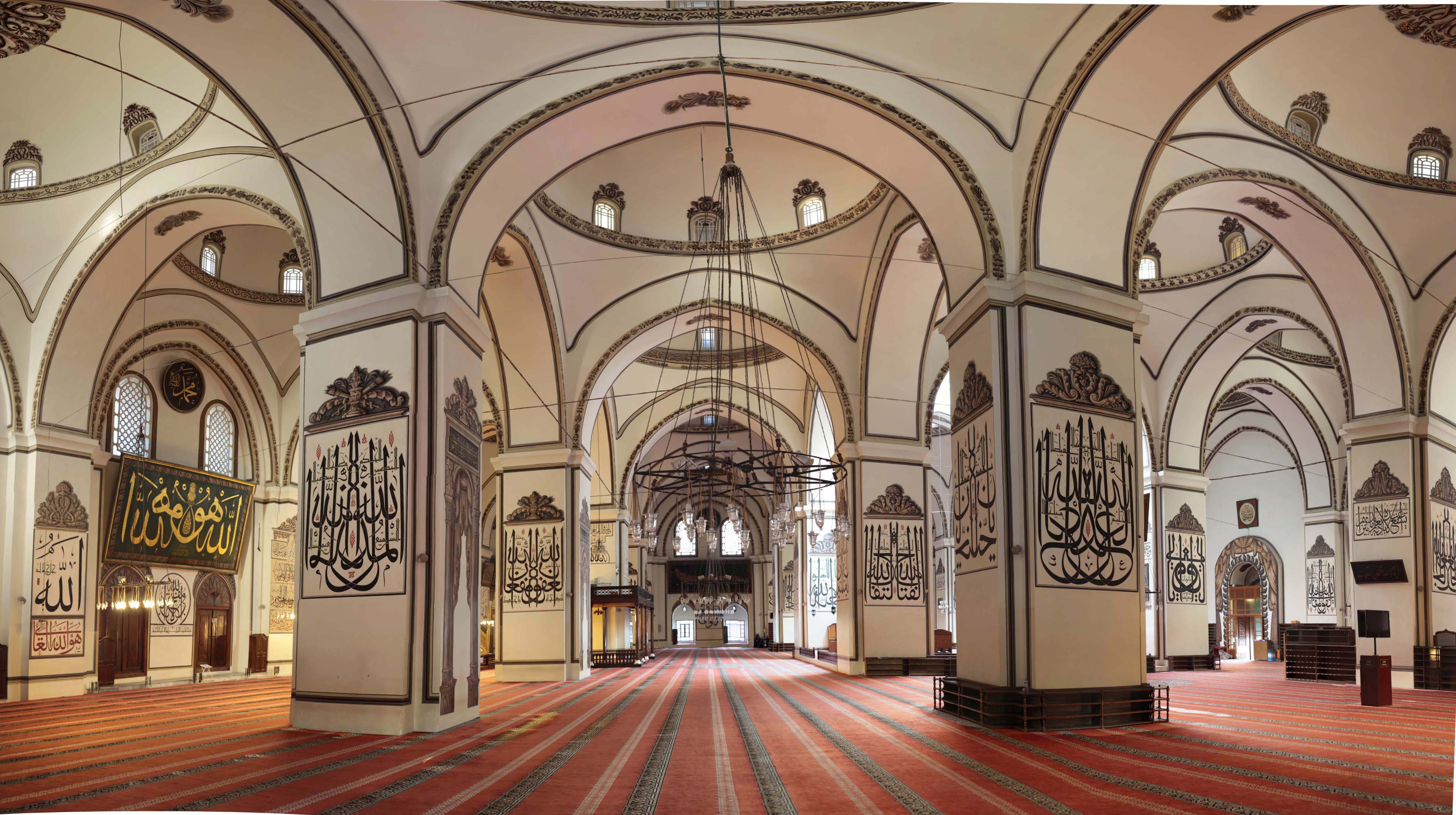
The multi-domed interior of the Grand Mosque of Bursa (1396–1400)

The most unusual mosque of this period is the multi-domed congregational mosque known as the Grand Mosque of Bursa or Ulu Cami. The mosque was commissioned by Bayezid I after the Battle of Nicopolis in 1396 and finished in 1399–1400. It consists of a large hypostyle hall divided into twenty equal bays in a rectangular four-by-five grid, each covered by a dome supported by stone piers. After Bayezid I was defeated at the Battle of Ankara in 1402, the Ottoman capital was moved to Edirne in Thrace. The last major multi-dome mosque built by the Ottomans (with some exceptions), is the Old Mosque (Eski Cami) in Edirne, built between 1403 and 1414. In later periods, the multi-dome building type was adapted for use in non-religious buildings instead, such as bedestens (market halls).

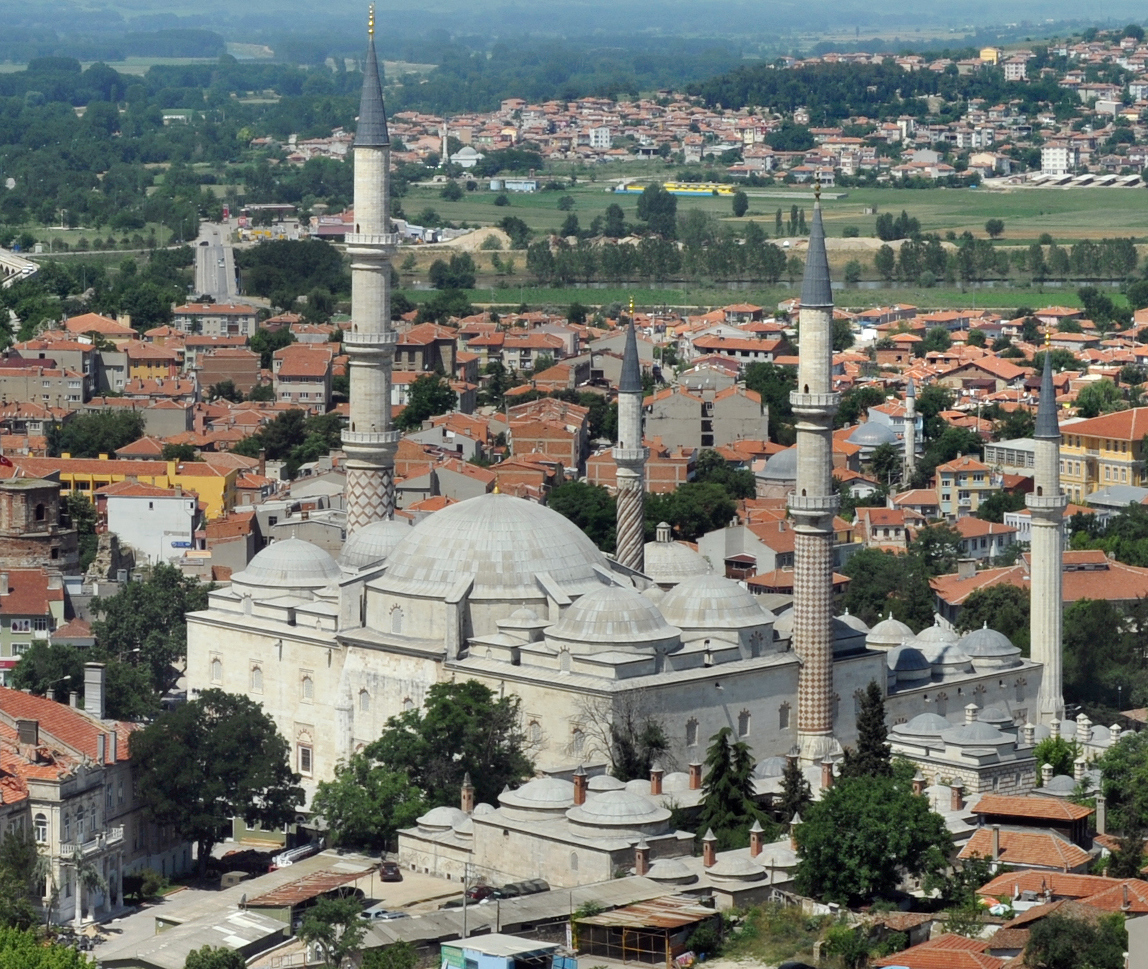
The Üç Şerefeli Mosque in Edirne (1437–1447) represented a significant evolution in Ottoman mosque design, with a courtyard leading to a prayer hall centered around a large dome.

The reign of Murad II (r. 1421–1451) marked an important architectural development in the form of the Üç Şerefeli Mosque, built in Edirne from 1437 to 1447. It has a very different design from earlier mosques, with a nearly square floor plan divided between a rectangular courtyard and a rectangular prayer hall. The open-air courtyard has a central fountain and is surrounded by a portico of arches and domes, with a decorated central portal leading into the courtyard from the outside and another one leading from the courtyard into the prayer hall. The prayer hall is centered around a huge dome which covers most of the middle part of the hall, while the sides of the hall are covered by pairs of smaller domes. The central dome is larger than any other Ottoman dome built before this. (Note: The dome is around 24 metres (79 ft) in diameter according to Godfrey Goodwin and some other sources, while Doğan Kuban writes that it is 27 metres (89 ft).) The mosque has a total of four minarets, arranged around the four corners of the courtyard. Its southwestern minaret was the tallest Ottoman minaret built up to that time and features three balconies (from which the mosque's name derives). This new design was a culmination of previous architectural experimentation and foreshadowed the features of later Ottoman mosque architecture.

=== After 1453 ===
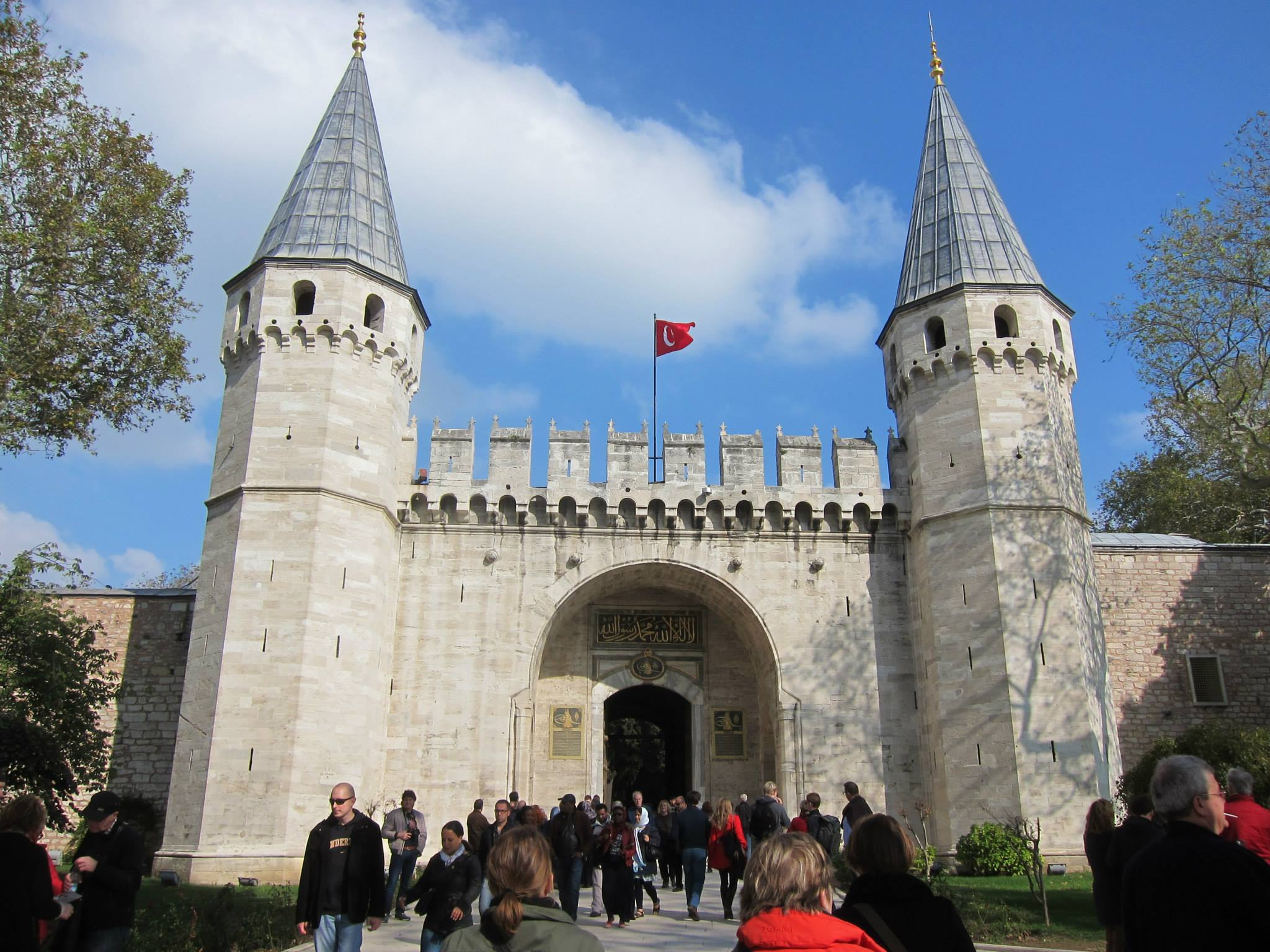
Babüsselam, the gate to the Second Courtyard of the Topkapı Palace. The palace was established by Mehmed II in 1459. This gate may be one of the structures still partly dating to his reign.

After Mehmed II conquered Constantinople (present-day Istanbul) in 1453, one of his first constructions in the city was a palace which became known as the Old Palace (Eski Saray). In 1459, he began construction of a second palace known as the New Palace (Yeni Saray) and later as the Topkapı Palace ("Cannon-Gate Palace"). It was mostly laid out between 1459 and 1465, but it has since been repeatedly modified over subsequent centuries by different rulers and today it is an accumulation of different styles and periods. The palace consists of multiple courtyards, enclosures, and pavilions spread across a precinct delimited by an outer wall. Its seemingly irregular layout was a reflection of a clear hierarchical organization of functions and private residences, with the innermost areas reserved for the privacy of the sultan and his innermost circle.

Mehmed II's largest contribution to religious architecture was the Fatih Mosque complex in Istanbul, built from 1463 to 1470. It was part of a very large külliye which also included a tabhane (guesthouse for travelers), an imaret, a darüşşifa (hospital), a caravanserai (hostel for traveling merchants), a mektep (primary school), a library, a hammam, shops, a cemetery with the founder's mausoleum, and eight madrasas along with their annexes. The buildings largely ignored any existing topography and were arranged in a strongly symmetrical layout on a vast square terrace with the monumental mosque at its center. The original mosque was mostly destroyed by an earthquake in 1766. Its design has been reconstructed by scholars using historical sources. It likely reflected the combination of the Byzantine church tradition (especially the Hagia Sophia) with the Ottoman tradition that had evolved since the early imperial mosques of Bursa and Edirne. Drawing on the ideas established by the earlier Üç Şerefeli Mosque, it comprised a rectangular courtyard leading to a domed prayer hall. The latter was covered by a large central dome with a semi-dome behind it (on the qibla side), flanked by a row of three smaller domes on either side.

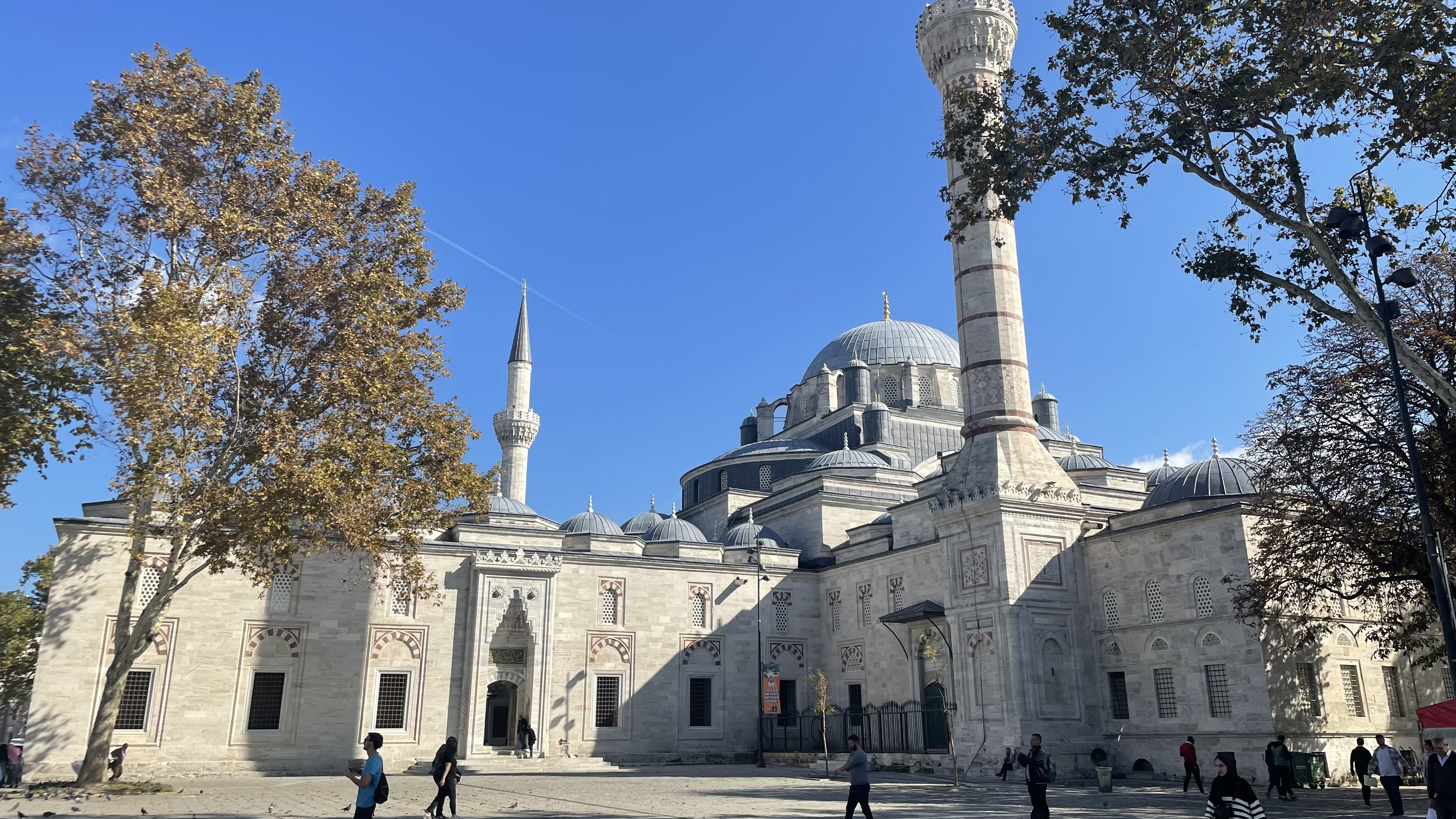
The design of the Bayezid II Mosque in Istanbul (1500–1505) demonstrates some of the final steps in the evolution towards the classical Ottoman style.

After Mehmed II, the reign of Bayezid II (r. 1481–1512) is again marked by extensive architectural patronage, of which the two most outstanding and influential examples are the Bayezid II Complex in Edirne and the Bayezid II Mosque in Istanbul. The Bayezid II Mosque in Istanbul, built between 1500 and 1505, again features a courtyard leading to a square prayer hall. However, its prayer hall makes use of two semi-domes aligned with the main central dome, while the side aisles are each covered by four smaller domes. Compared to earlier mosques, this results in a much more sophisticated "cascade of domes" effect for the building's exterior profile. This design, with its deliberate arrangement of established Ottoman architectural elements into a strongly symmetrical plan, is another culmination of previous architectural exploration and represents the last step towards the classical Ottoman style.

== Classical period (16th to 17th centuries) ==
The classical period of Ottoman architecture is commonly associated with the works of the imperial architect Mimar Sinan (d. 1588). During this period, the bureaucracy of the Ottoman state, whose foundations were laid in Istanbul by Mehmed II, became increasingly elaborate and the profession of the architect became further institutionalized. The reign of Suleiman the Magnificent (r. 1520–1566) is also recognized as the apogee of Ottoman political and cultural development, with extensive patronage in art and architecture by the sultan, his family, and his high-ranking officials. Especially under the work and influence of Sinan, Ottoman architecture in this period saw a new unification and harmonization of the various architectural elements and influences that it had previously absorbed but which had not yet been fully synthesized into a collective whole. It used a limited set of general forms – such as domes, semi-domes, and arcaded porticos – which were repeated in every structure and could be combined in a limited number of ways. Within this framework, the ingenuity of successful architects such as Sinan lay in the careful and calculated attempts to solve problems of space, proportion, and harmony. This period is also notable for the development of Iznik tile decoration in Ottoman monuments, with the artistic peak of this medium beginning in the second half of the 16th century.

=== The era of Sinan ===
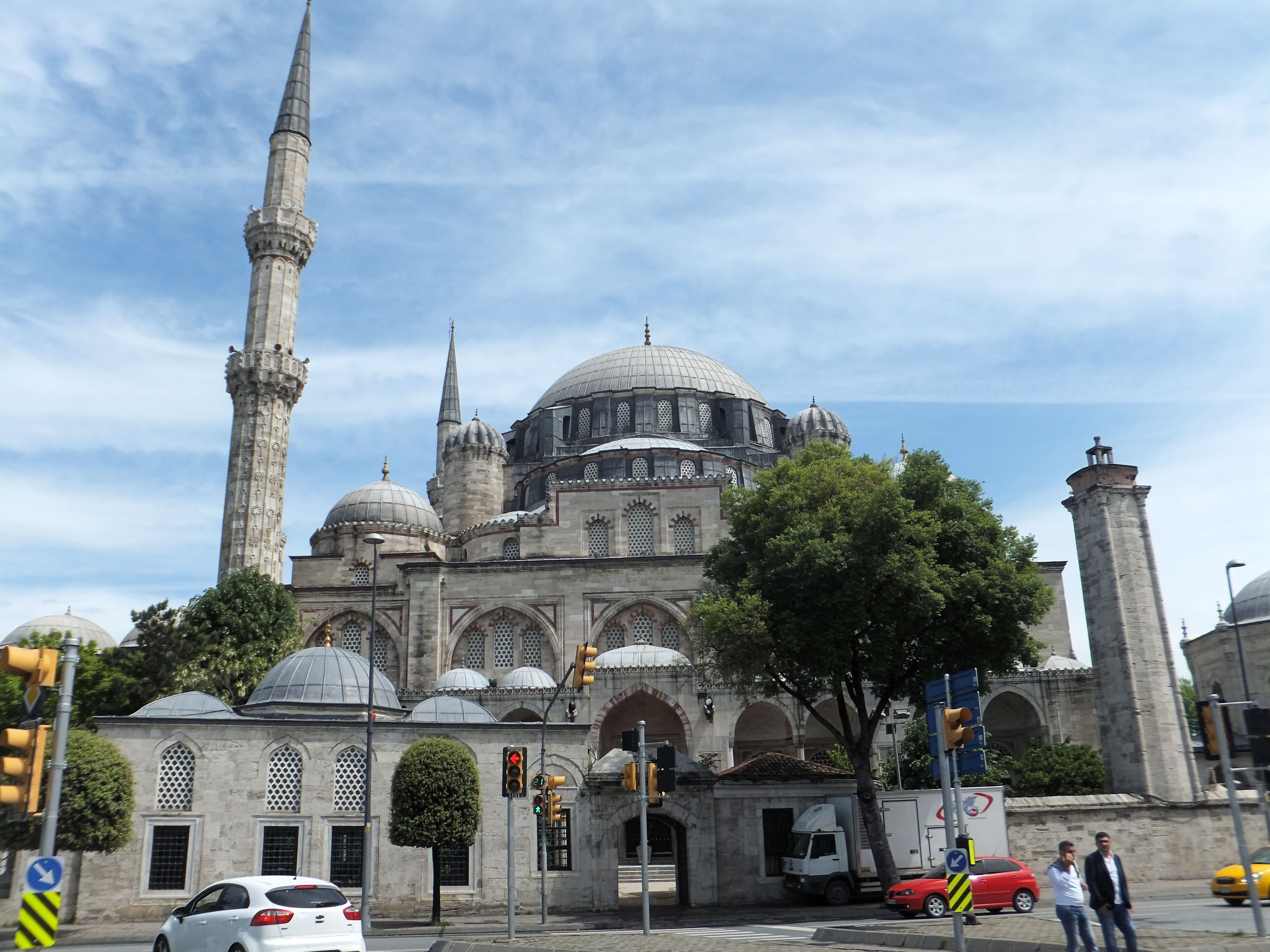
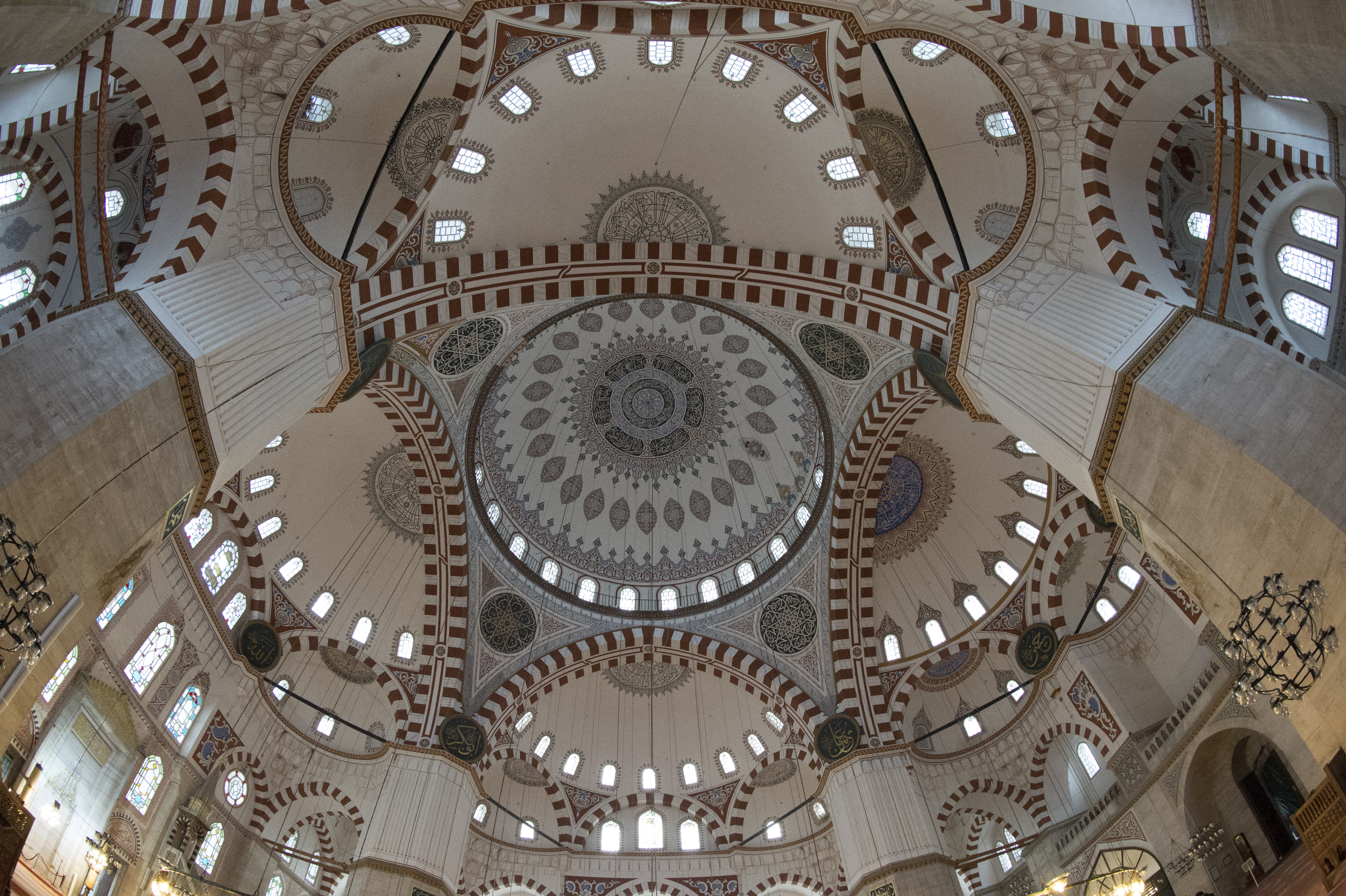
The Şehzade Mosque (1545–1548) in Istanbul was Mimar Sinan's first major imperial commission.

The master architect of the classical period, Sinan, served as the chief court architect (mimarbaşi) for some 50 years from 1538 until his death in 1588. Sinan credited himself with the design of over 300 buildings, though another estimate of his works puts it at nearly 500. He is credited with designing buildings as far as Buda (present-day Budapest) and Mecca. He was probably not present to directly supervise projects far from the capital, so in these cases his designs were most likely executed by his assistants or by local architects.

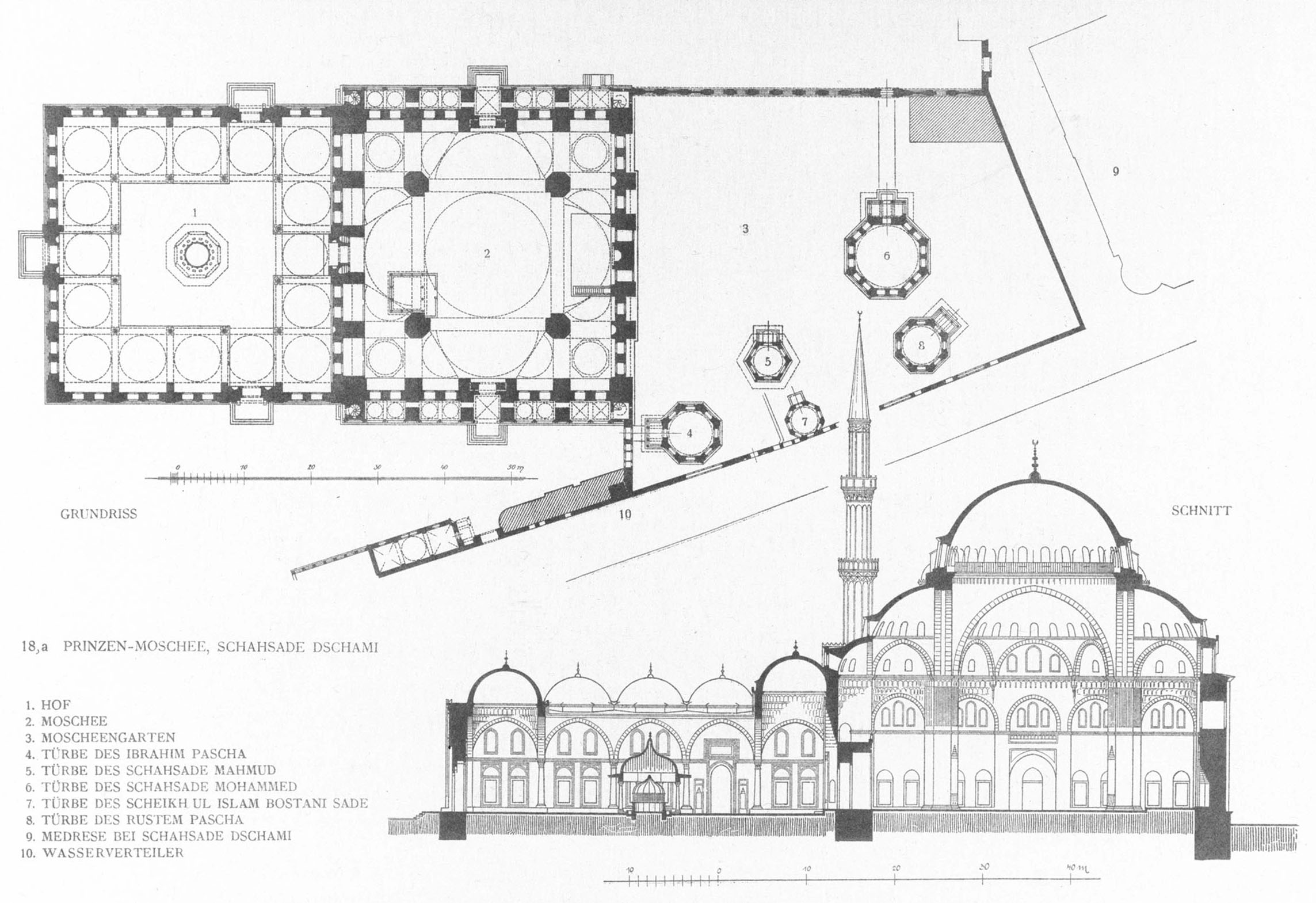
Floor plan and elevation of the Şehzade Mosque, showing the symmetrical layout of the central dome and four main semi-domes. This basic design was eventually repeated in many later mosques in the Ottoman Empire.

Sinan's first major imperial commission was the Şehzade Mosque complex, which Suleiman dedicated to his son Şehzade Mehmed, who died in 1543. The complex was built between 1545 and 1548. The mosque has a rectangular floor plan divided into two equal squares, with one square occupied by the courtyard and the other occupied by the prayer hall. The prayer hall consists of a central dome surrounded by semi-domes on four sides, with smaller domes occupying the corners. Smaller semi-domes also fill the space between the corner domes and the main semi-domes. This design represents the culmination of the previous domed and semi-domed buildings in Ottoman architecture, bringing complete symmetry to the dome layout. Sinan's early innovations are also evident in the way he organized the structural supports of the dome. Instead of having the dome rest on thick walls all around it (as was previously common), he concentrated the load-bearing supports into a limited number of buttresses along the outer walls of the mosque and in four pillars inside the mosque itself at the corners of the dome. This allowed for the walls in between the buttresses to be thinner and able to accommodate more windows to bring in more light. Sinan also moved the outer walls inward, near the inner edge of the buttresses, so that the latter were less visible inside the mosque. On the outside, he added domed porticos along the lateral façades of the building which further obscured the buttresses and gave the exterior a greater sense of monumentality.

The basic design of the Şehzade Mosque, with its symmetrical dome and four semi-dome layout, proved popular with later architects and was repeated in classical Ottoman mosques after Sinan (e.g. the Sultan Ahmed Mosque, the New Mosque at Eminönü, and the 18th-century reconstruction of the Fatih Mosque). Despite this legacy and the symmetry of its design, Sinan considered the Sehzade Mosque his "apprentice" work and was not satisfied with it. He did not repeat its layout in any of his other works during his career. He instead experimented with other designs that seemed to aim for a completely unified interior space and for ways to emphasize the visitor's perception of the main dome upon entering a mosque. One of the results of this objective was that any space that did not belong to the central domed space was reduced to a minimum, subordinate role, if not altogether absent.

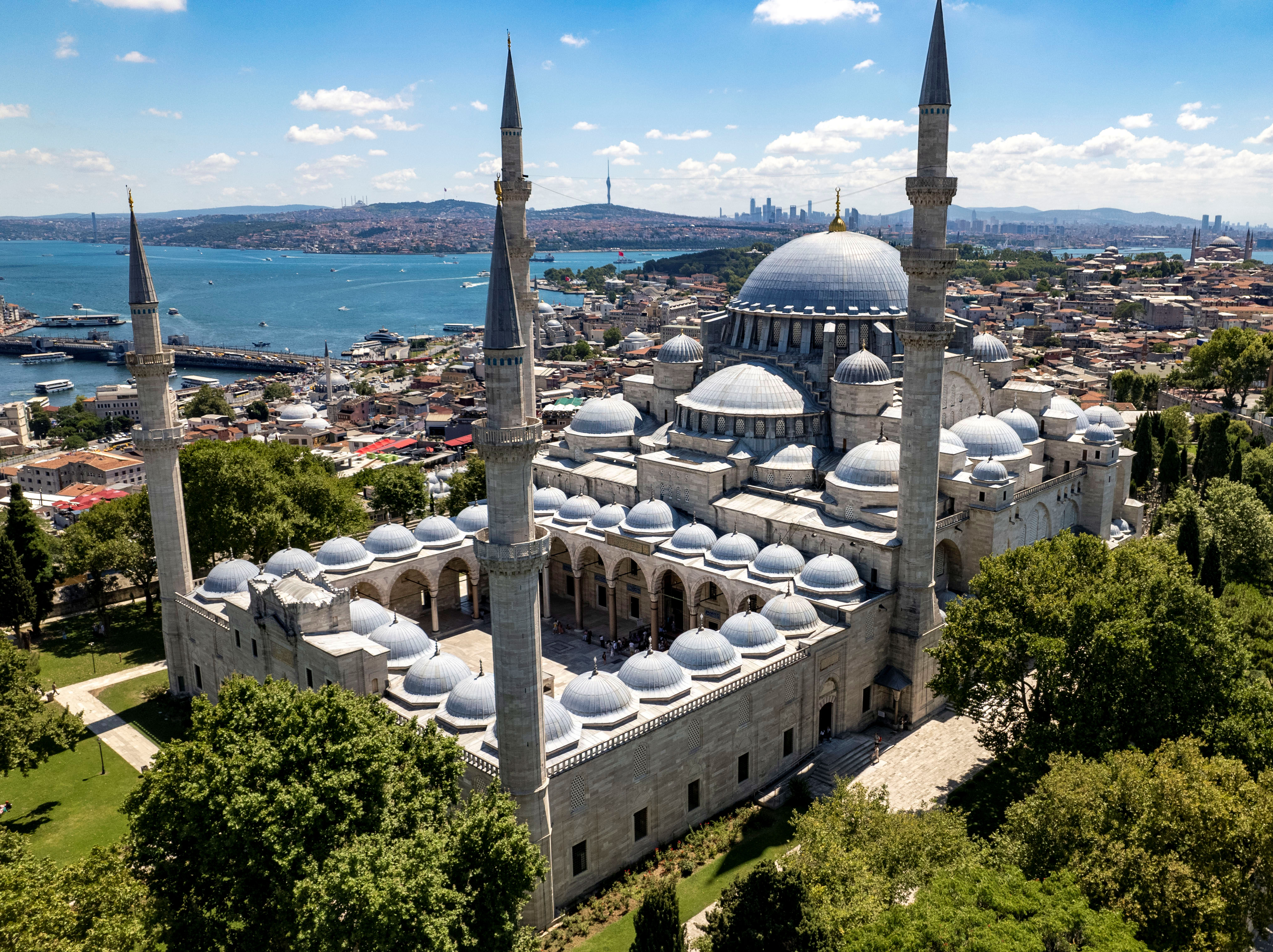
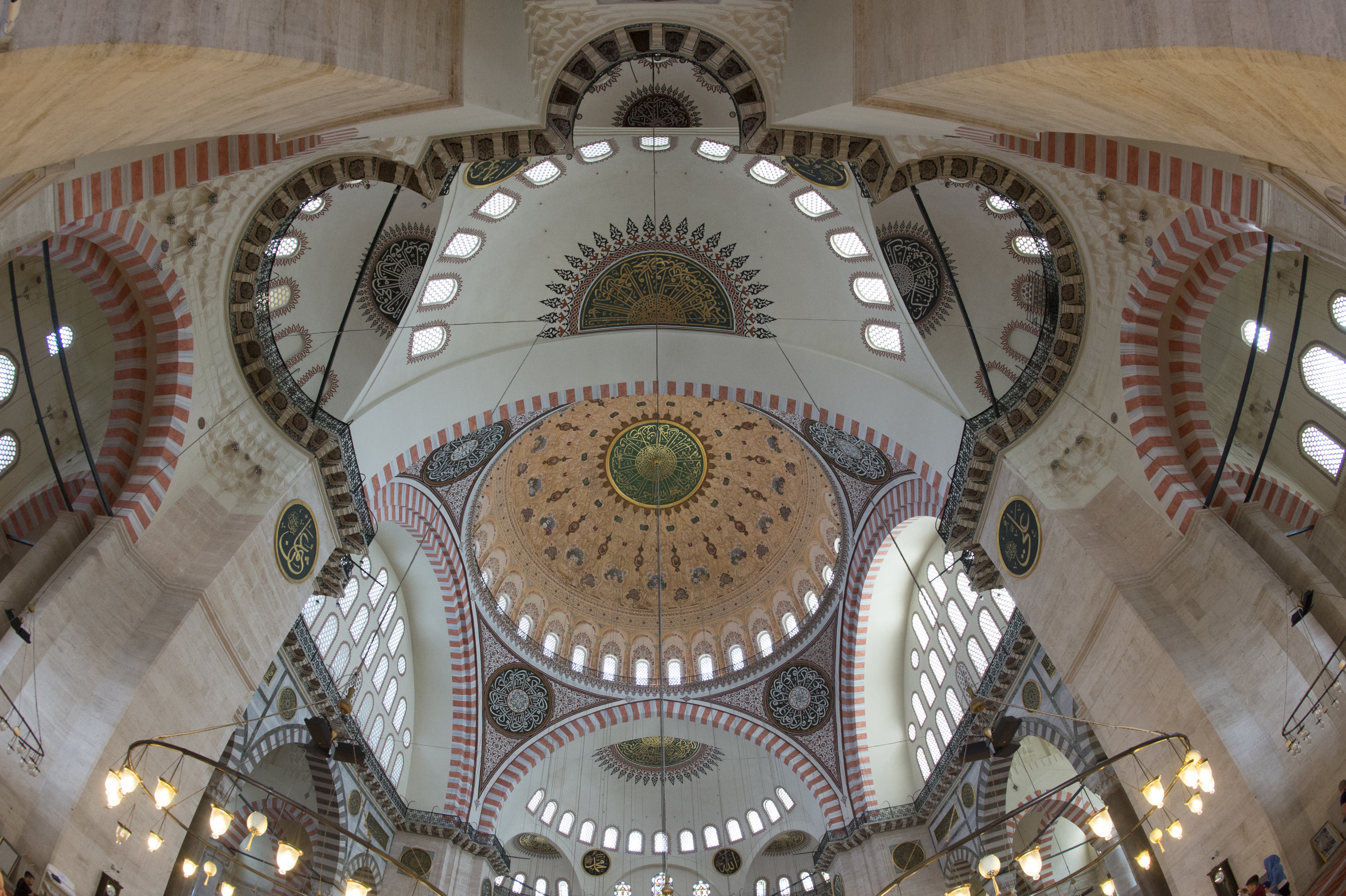
The Süleymaniye Mosque (1550–1557) in Istanbul is one of the most important monuments of the classical Ottoman period.

In 1550, Sinan began construction for the Süleymaniye complex, a monumental religious and charitable complex dedicated to Suleiman. Construction finished in 1557. Following the example of the earlier Fatih complex, it consists of many buildings arranged around the main mosque in the center, on a planned site occupying the summit of a hill in Istanbul. The Süleymaniye Mosque complex is one of the most important symbols of Ottoman architecture and is often considered by scholars to be the most magnificent mosque in Istanbul. The mosque itself has a form similar to that of the earlier Bayezid II Mosque: a central dome preceded and followed by semi-domes, with smaller domes covering the sides. In particular, the building replicates the central dome layout of the Hagia Sophia. This may be interpreted as a desire by Suleiman to emulate the structure of the Hagia Sophia, demonstrating how this ancient monument continued to hold tremendous symbolic power in Ottoman culture. Nonetheless, Sinan employed innovations similar to those he used previously in the Şehzade Mosque: he concentrated the load-bearing supports into a limited number of columns and pillars, which allowed for more windows in the walls and minimized the physical separations within the prayer hall. The exterior façades of the mosque are characterized by ground-level porticos, two large tympanum-like walls below the dome that are pierced by many windows, and domes and semi-domes that progressively culminate upwards – in a roughly pyramidal fashion – to the large central dome.

After designing the Süleymaniye complex, Sinan appears to have focused on experimenting with the single-domed space. In the 1550s and 1560s, he experimented with an "octagonal baldaquin" design for the main dome, in which the dome rests on an octagonal drum supported by a system of eight pillars or buttresses. An example of this is the Rüstem Pasha Mosque (1561) in Istanbul. This mosque is also famous for its wide array of Iznik tiles covering the walls of its exterior portico and its interior, which was unprecedented in Ottoman architecture and contrasts with the usually restrained decoration Sinan employed in other buildings.

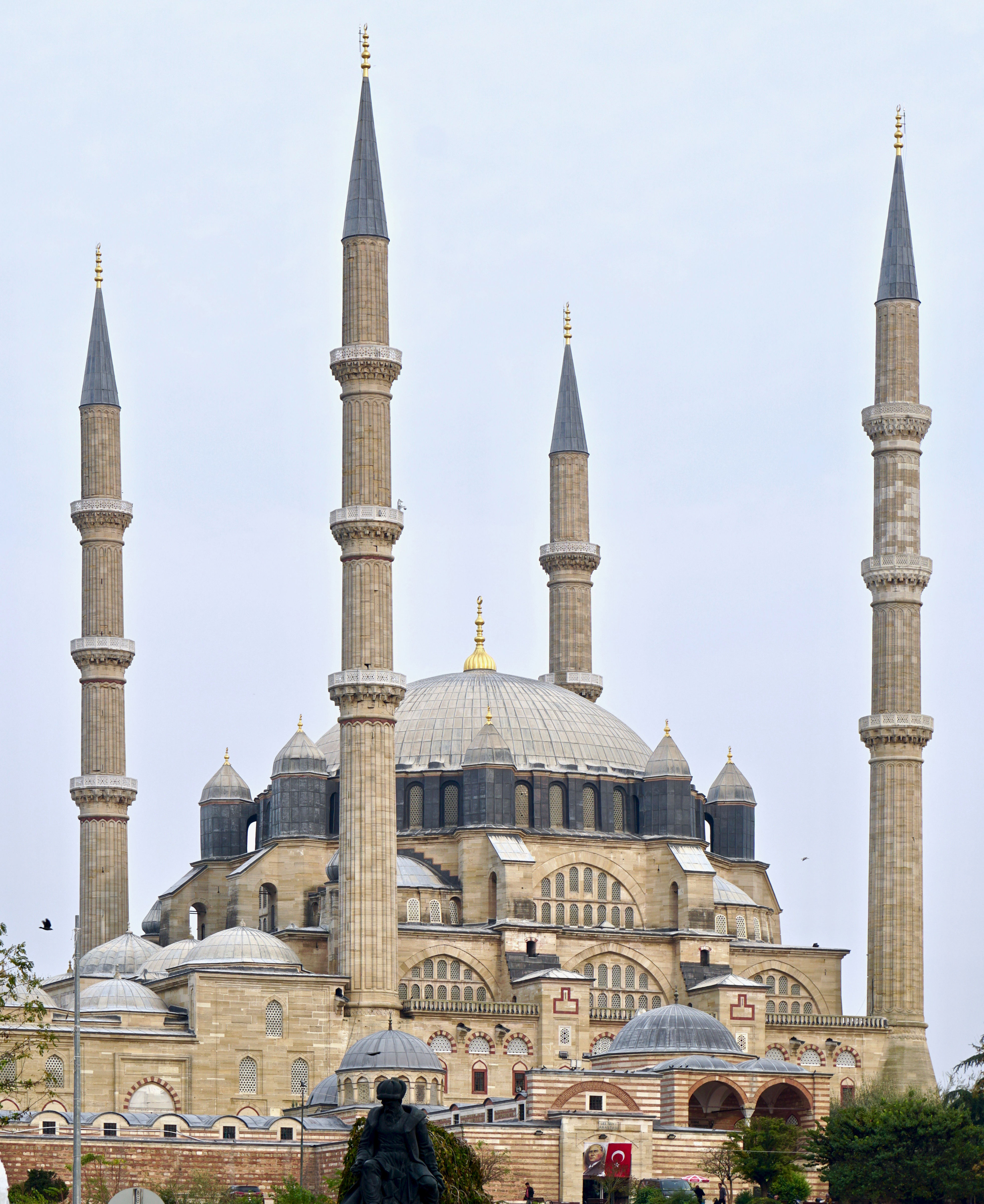
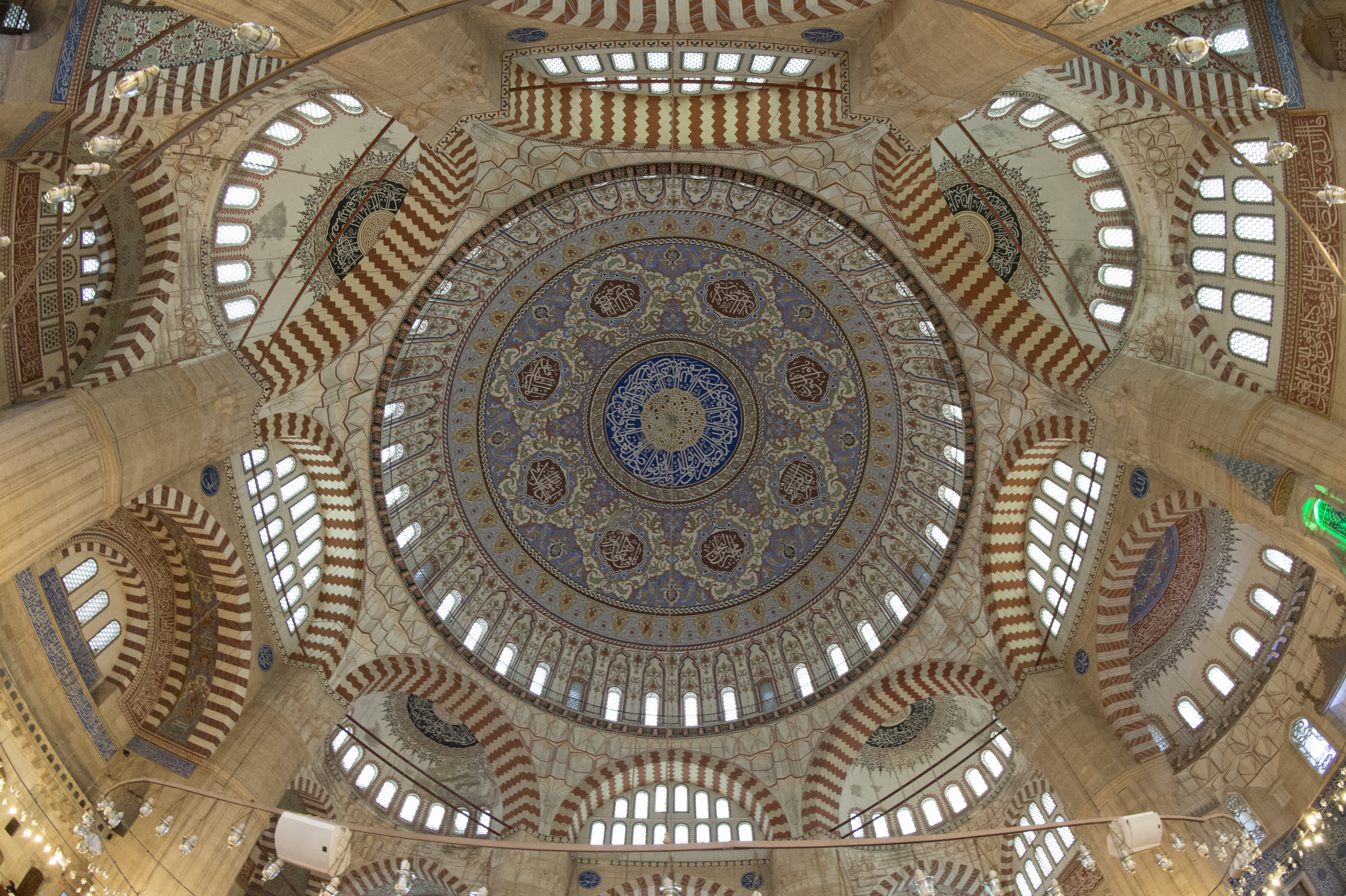
The Selimiye Mosque in Edirne (1568–1574), dominated by a single huge dome, was considered by Sinan to be his crowning masterpiece.

Sinan's crowning masterpiece is the Selimiye Mosque in Edirne, which was begun in 1568 and completed in 1574 (or possibly 1575). Its prayer hall is notable for being completely dominated by a single massive dome, whose view is unimpeded by the structural elements seen in other large domed mosques before this. This design is the culmination of Sinan's spatial experiments, making use of the octagonal baldaquin as the most effective method of integrating the round dome with the rectangular hall below by minimizing the space occupied by the supporting elements of the dome. The dome is supported on eight massive pillars which are partly freestanding but closely integrated with the outer walls. Additional outer buttresses are concealed in the walls of the mosque, allowing the walls in between to be pierced with a large number of windows. Sinan's biographies praise the dome for its size and height, which is approximately the same diameter as the Hagia Sophia's main dome; (Note: The dome's diameter is 31.22 metres (102.4 ft), whereas the slightly elliptical dome of the Hagia Sophia has a diameter ranging from 30.9 to 31.8 metres (101 to 104 ft). While Sinan's biography claims that the dome is also higher, this may refer only to the fact that the dome is taller from its base to its apex, as the curvature of the Hagia Sophia's dome is flatter and thus less tall. From the ground level to its apex, the dome is 42.5 metres (139 ft) high whereas the Hagia Sophia's is 55.6 metres (182 ft) high.) the first time that this had been achieved in Ottoman architecture.

=== After Sinan ===
After Sinan, the classical style became less creative and more repetitive by comparison with earlier periods. Davud Agha succeeded Sinan as chief architect. Among his most notable works, all in Istanbul, are the Koca Sinan Pasha Complex on Divanyolu (1593), the Cerrahpaşa Mosque (1593 or 1594), the Gazanfer Ağa Medrese complex (1596), and the Tomb of Murad III (completed in 1599). Some scholars argue that the Nışançı Mehmed Pasha Mosque (1584–1589), whose architect is unknown, should also be attributed to him. Its design is highly accomplished and it may be one of the first Ottoman mosques to be fronted by a garden courtyard.

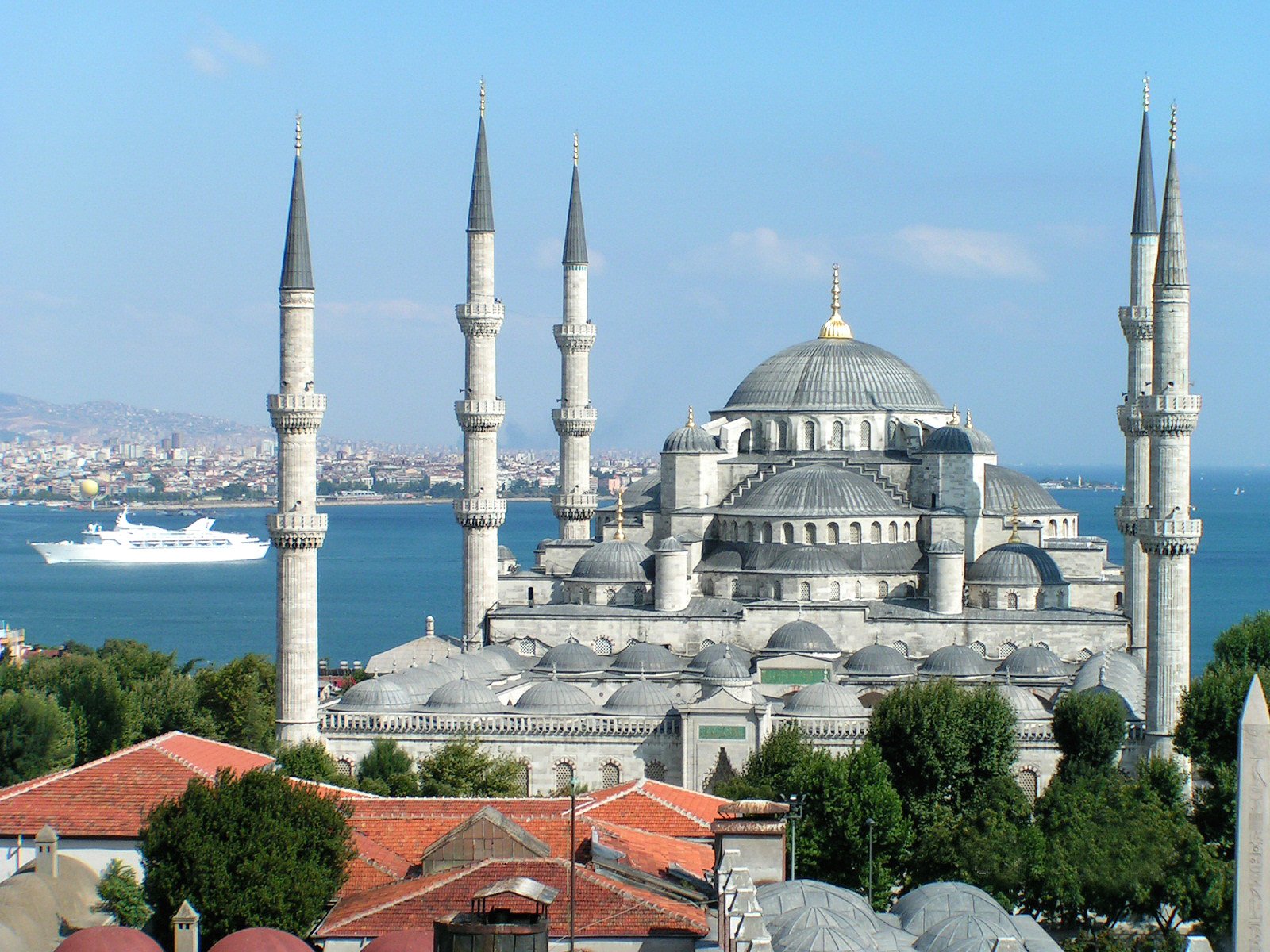
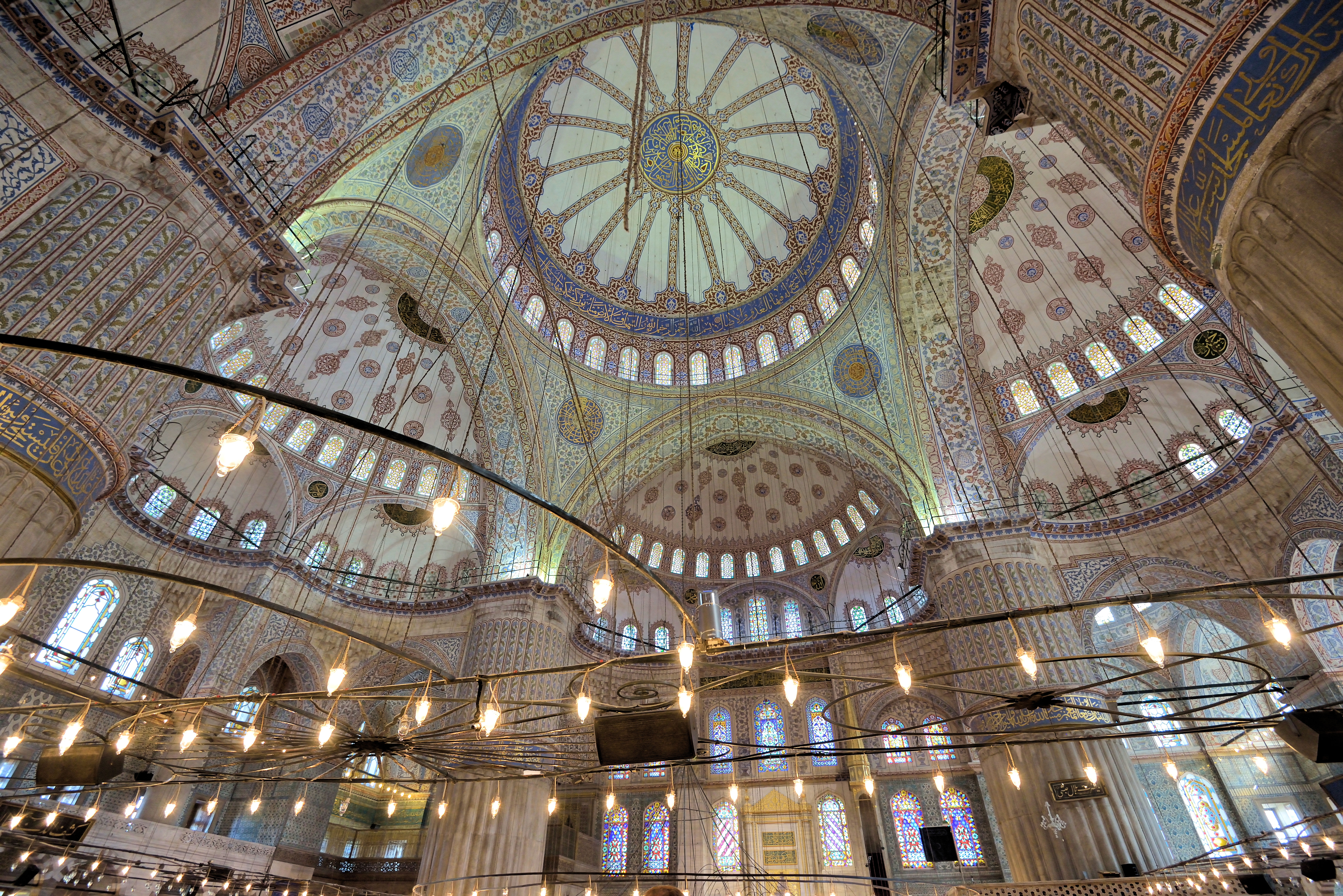
Sultan Ahmed Mosque in Istanbul (1609–1617)

The Sultan Ahmed Mosque was begun in 1609 and completed in 1617. It was designed by Sinan's apprentice, Mehmed Agha. The mosque's size, location, and decoration suggest it was intended to be a rival to the nearby Hagia Sophia. Its basic design repeats that of the Şehzade Mosque. On the outside, Mehmed Agha opted to achieve a "softer" profile with the cascade of domes and the various curving elements, differing from the more dramatic juxtaposition of domes and vertical elements seen in earlier classical mosques by Sinan. It is also the only Ottoman mosque to have as many as six minarets. On the inside, the mosque's lower walls are lavishly decorated with thousands of predominantly blue Iznik tiles. Along with the painted decoration on the rest of the walls, this has given the mosque its popular name, the "Blue Mosque". After the Sultan Ahmed Mosque, no other great imperial mosques dedicated to a sultan were built in Istanbul until the mid-18th century. Mosques continued to be built and dedicated to other dynastic family members, but the tradition of sultans building their own monumental mosques lapsed.

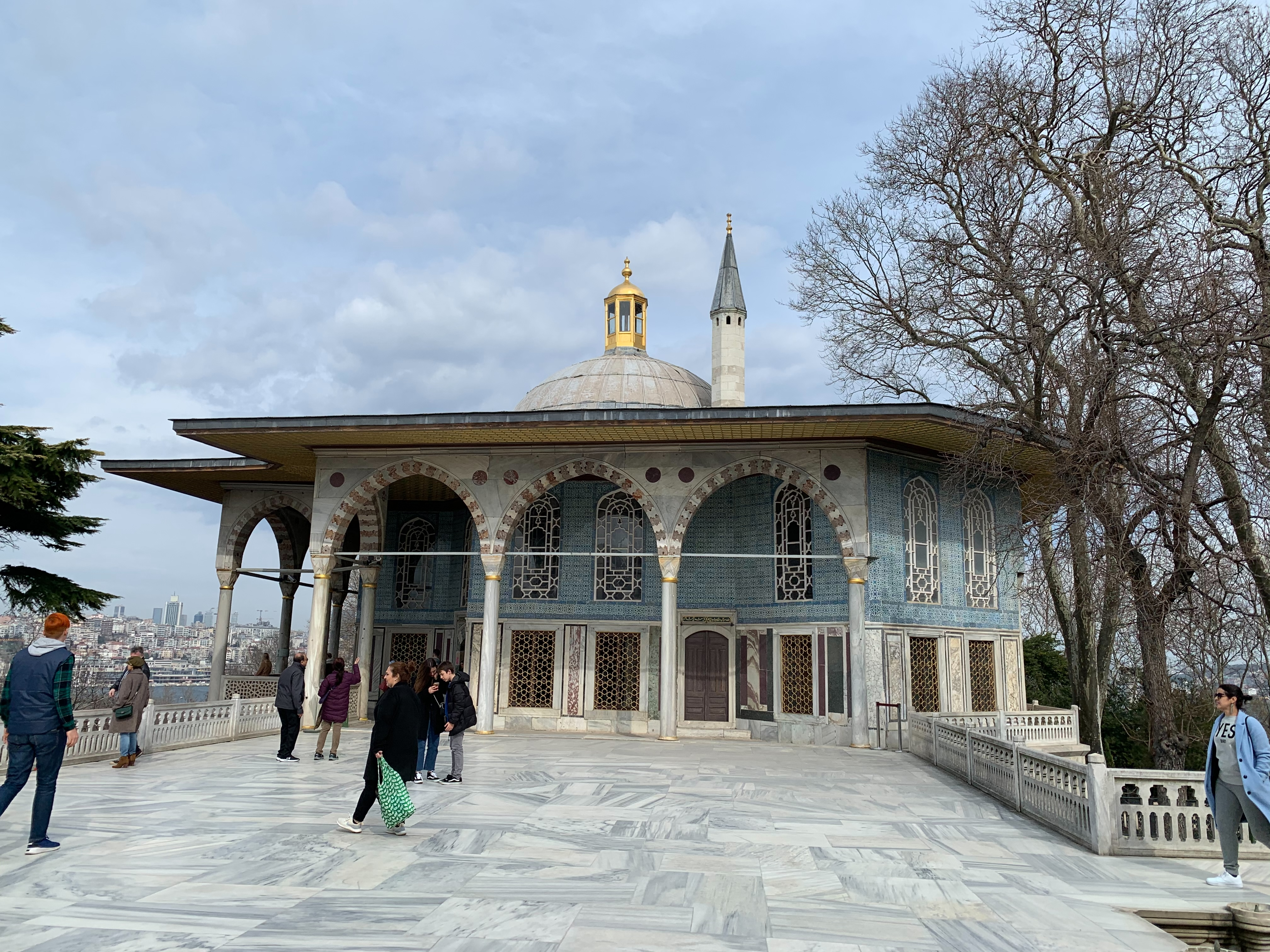
Baghdad Kiosk in Topkapı Palace (1639)

Some of the best examples of early 17th-century Ottoman architecture are also found in Topkapı Palace, at the Revan Kiosk (1635) and Baghdad Kiosk (1639), built by Murad IV to commemorate his victories against the Safavids. Both are small pavilions raised on platforms overlooking the palace gardens. Both are harmoniously decorated on the inside and outside with predominantly blue and white tiles and richly-inlaid window shutters.

== Tulip Period (early 18th century) ==
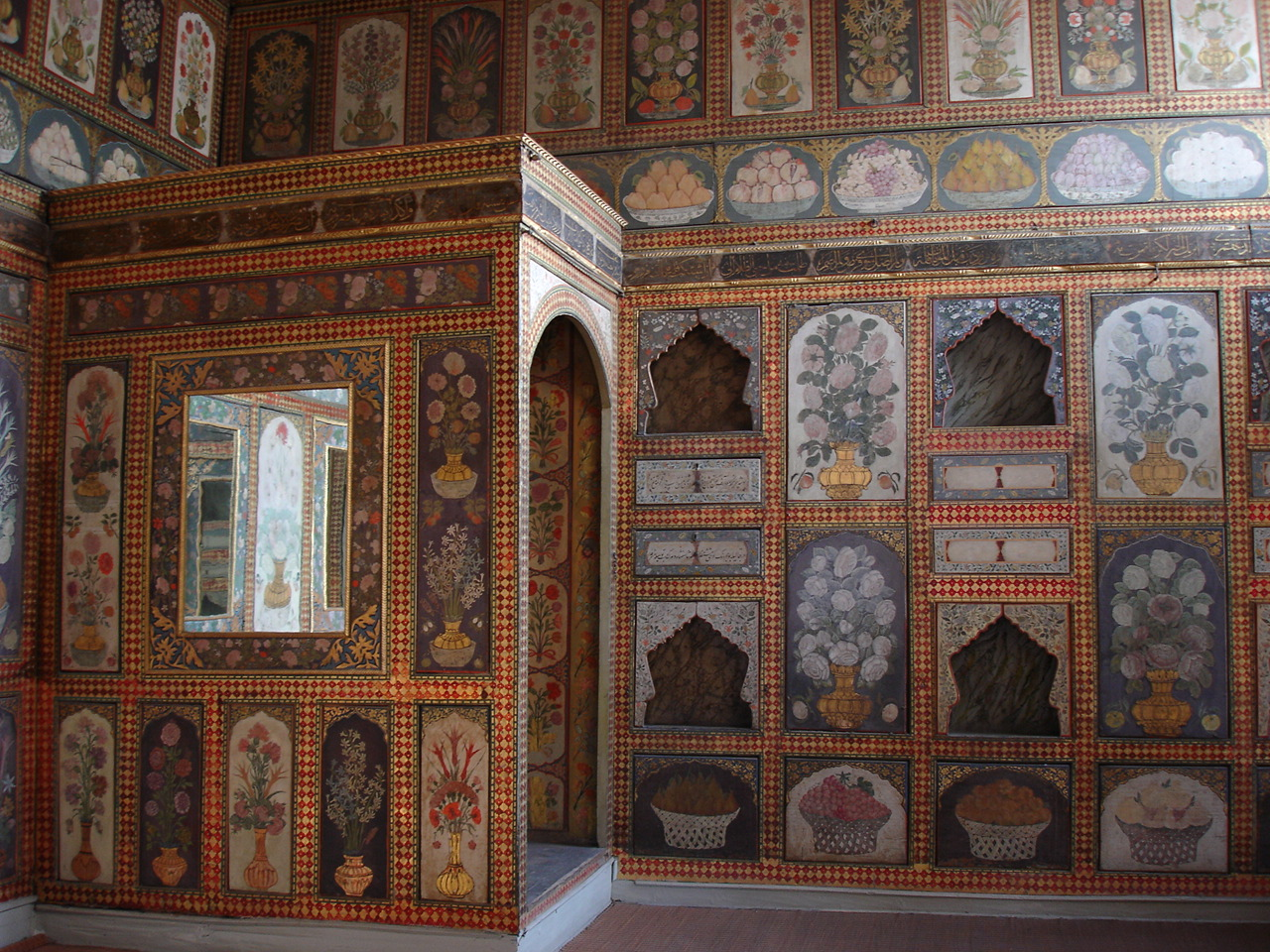
The Fruit Room in the Harem of Topkapı Palace (1705)

The historical period known as the Tulip Period or Tulip Era is considered to have begun in 1718, during Ahmed III's reign (r. 1703–1730), and lasted until the Patrona Halil revolts of 1730, when Ahmed III was overthrown. These years of peace inaugurated a new era of growing cross-cultural exchange between the Ottoman Empire and Western Europe. From the 18th century onward, European influences were thus introduced into Ottoman architecture as the Ottoman Empire itself became more open to outside influences. The period saw significant influence from the French Rococo style (part of the wider Baroque style) that emerged around this time under the reign of Louis XV. In addition to European influences, the decoration of the Tulip Period was also influenced by Safavid art and architecture to the east. Although the new architectural style that emerged at this time is generally associated with the Tulip Period, constructions from the first years of Ahmed III's reign, such as the so-called Fruit Room created in 1705 within Topkapı Palace, demonstrate that the new style was already in existence by then.

One of the most important creations of the Tulip Period was the Sadâbâd Palace, a new summer palace designed and built by Damat Ibrahim Pasha in 1722–1723 for Ahmed III. It was located at Kâğıthane, a rural area on the outskirts of the city with small rivers that flow into the Golden Horn inlet. The palace grounds included a long marble-lined canal, the Cedval-i Sim, around which were gardens, pavilions, and palace apartments in a landscaped setting. This overall design probably emulated French pleasure palaces as a result of the reports about Paris and Versailles brought back by Ottoman ambassador Yirmisekiz Çelebi Mehmed Efendi. The regular inhabitants of Istanbul also used the surrounding area as a recreational ground for excursions and picnics. This was a new practice in Ottoman culture that brought the public within close proximity of the ruler's abode for the first time.

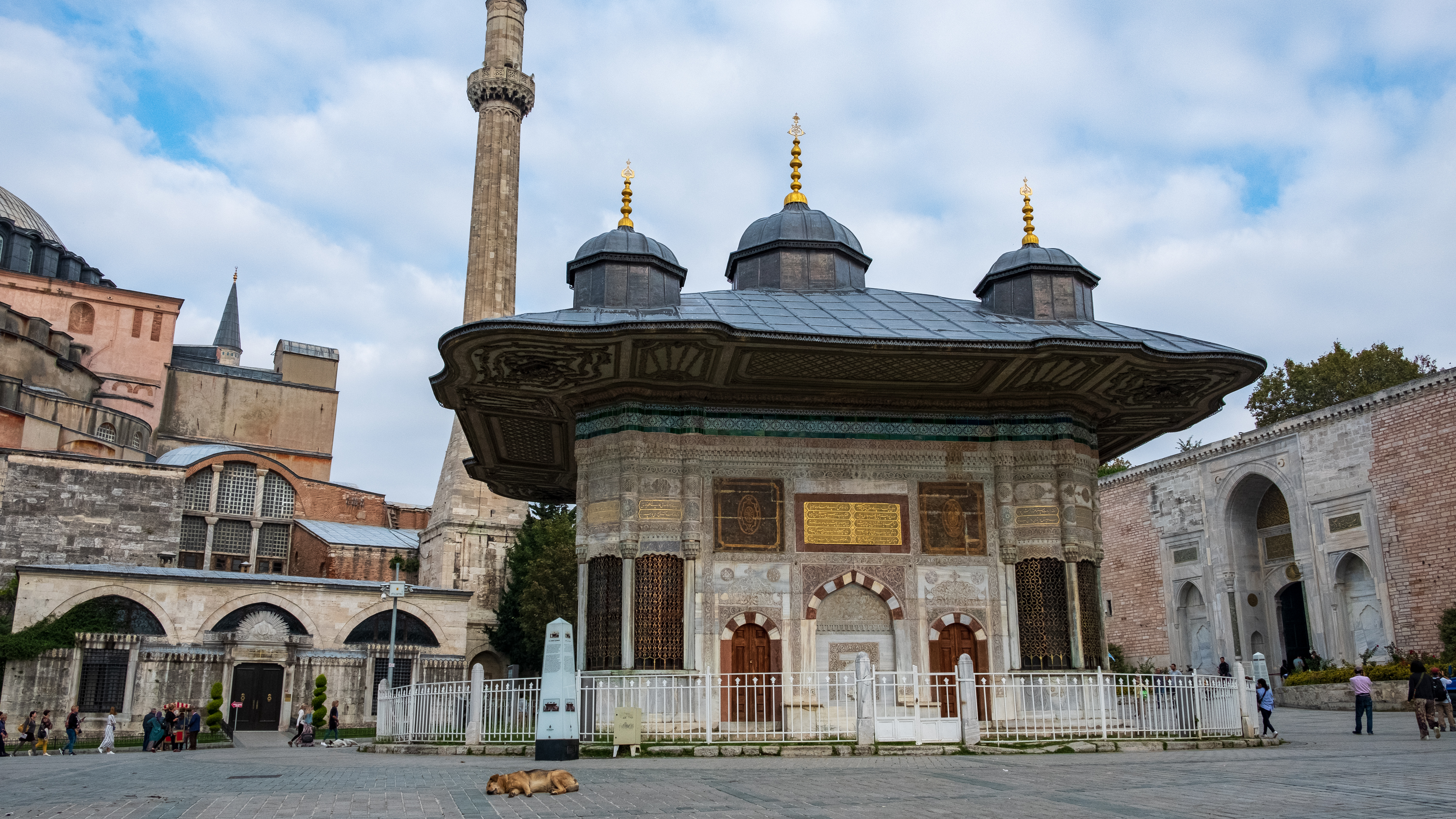
Ahmed III Fountain near Hagia Sophia in Istanbul (1728)

The culmination of the Tulip Period style is represented by a series of monumental stand-alone fountains that were mostly built between 1728 and 1732. Water took on an enlarged role in architecture and the urban landscape of Istanbul during the Tulip Period. In the first half of the 18th century, Istanbul's water supply infrastructure was renovated and expanded. In 1732, an important water distribution structure, the taksim, was first built on what is now Taksim Square. The new fountains were unprecedented in Ottoman architecture. Previously, fountains and sebils only existed as minor elements of larger charitable complexes or as shadirvans inside mosque courtyards. The maidan fountain, or a stand-alone fountain at the center of a city square, was introduced for the first time in this period. The first and most remarkable of these is the Ahmed III Fountain built in 1728 next to the Hagia Sophia and in front of the outer gate of Topkapı Palace.

The construction of stand-alone library structures was another new trend influenced by European ideas, as the Ottomans traditionally did not build libraries except as secondary elements attached to religious complexes. The earlier Köprülü Library, built in 1678 was the first of its kind, but other early examples date from the reign of Ahmed III during the Tulip Period.

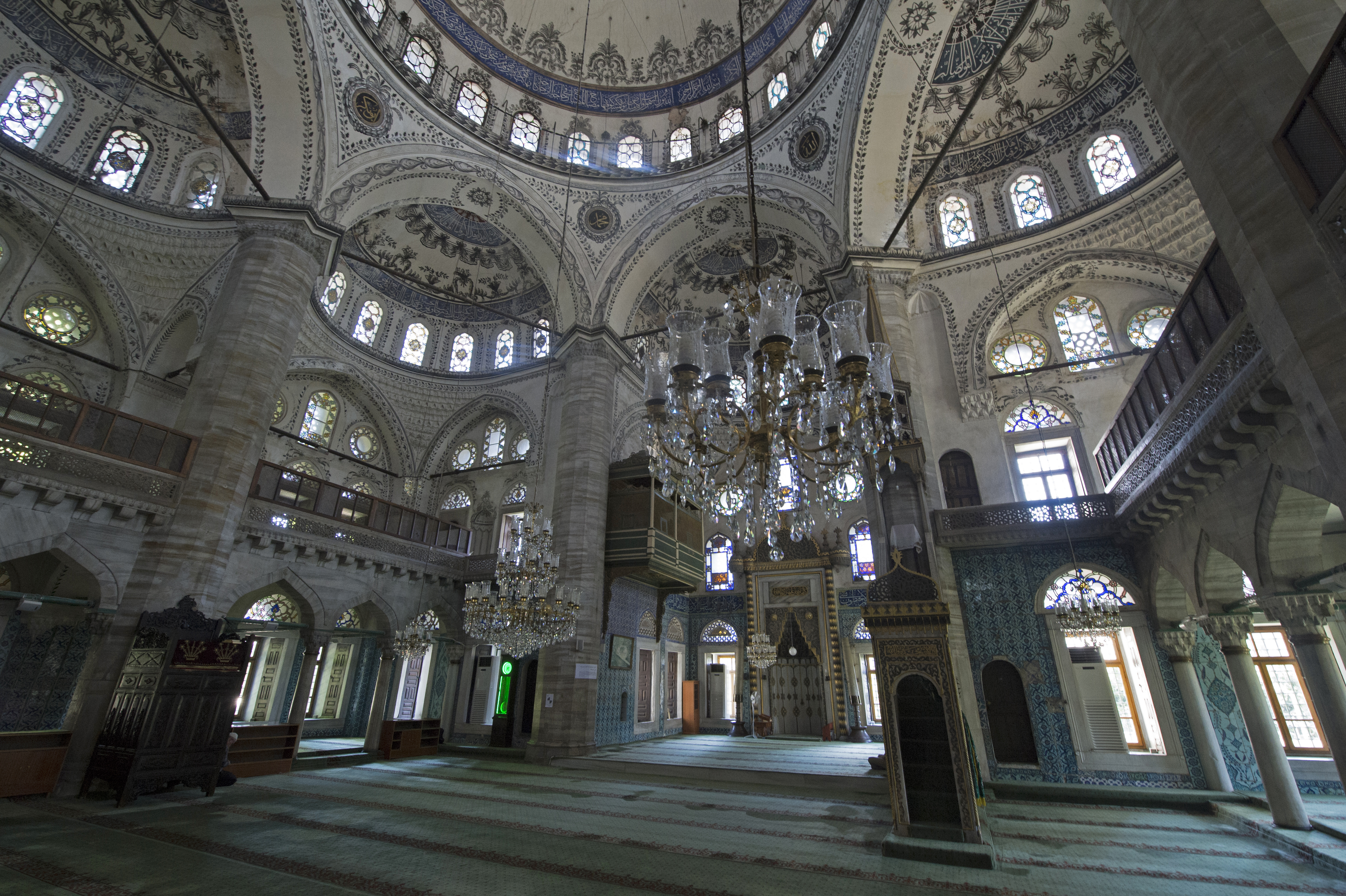
Interior of the Hekimoğlu Ali Pasha Mosque in Istanbul (1734–1735)

One of the few major religious complexes built in this period and one of the last major monuments of the Tulip Period stage in Ottoman architecture is the Hekimoğlu Ali Pasha Mosque complex, completed in 1734–1735 and sponsored by the grand vizier of the same name. This mosque still reflects an overall classical form but the flexible placement of the various components of the complex around a garden enclosure is more reflective of the new changes in tastes. The interior of the mosque is decorated with tiles from the Tekfursaray kilns, which were of lesser quality than those of the earlier Iznik period. One group of tiles is painted with an illustration of the Great Mosque of Mecca, a decorative detail found in other examples from this era.

== Baroque period (18th century to early 19th century) ==
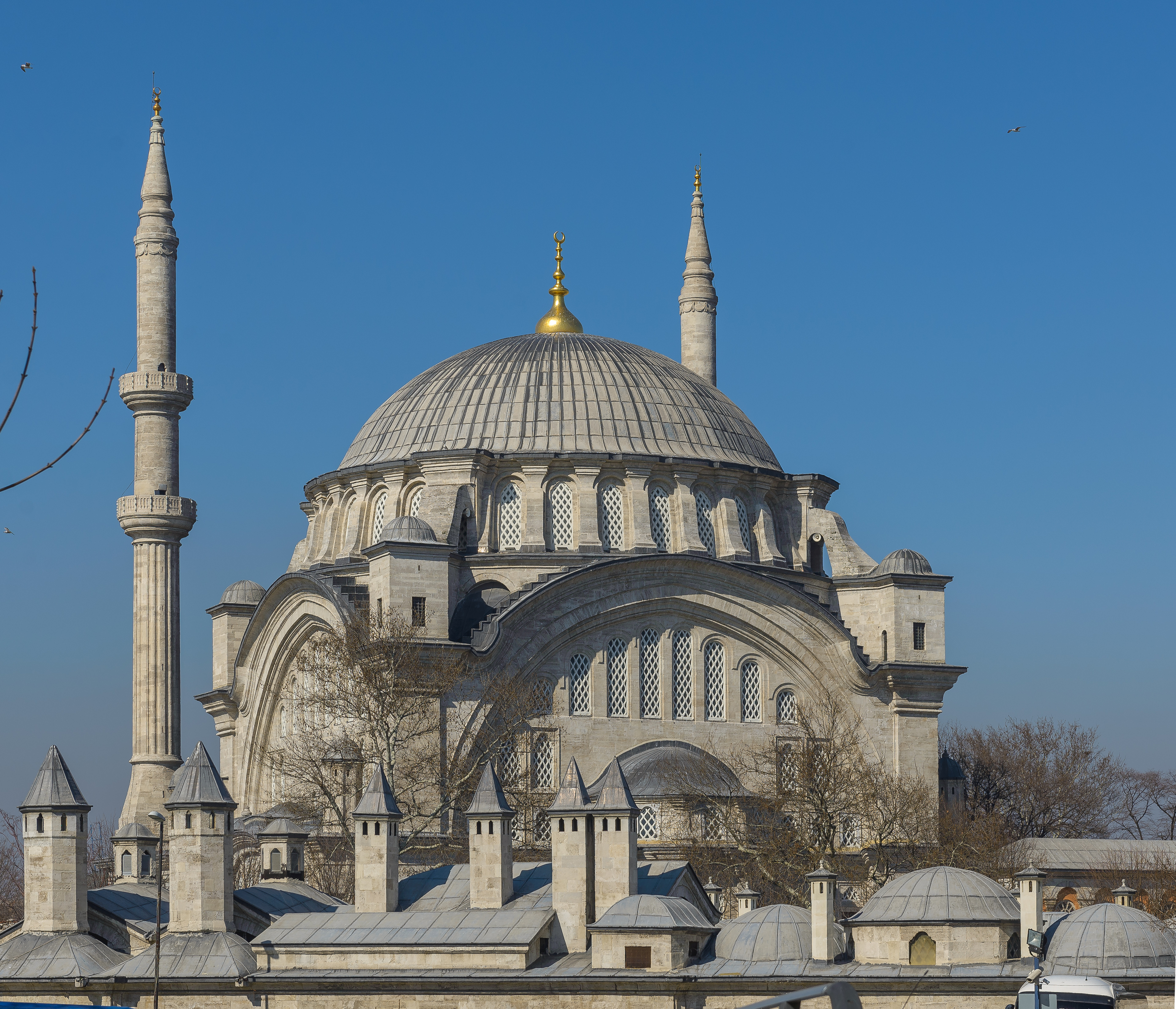
Nuruosmaniye Mosque in Istanbul (1748–1755), one of the major landmarks of the Ottoman Baroque period

During the 1740s a new Ottoman or Turkish "Baroque" style emerged in its full expression and rapidly replaced the style of the Tulip Period. This shift signaled the final end to the classical style. The political and cultural conditions which led to the Ottoman Baroque trace their origins in part to the Tulip Period, when the Ottoman ruling class opened itself to Western influence. After the Tulip Period, Ottoman architecture openly imitated European architecture, so that architectural and decorative trends in Europe were often mirrored in the Ottoman Empire at the same time or after a short delay. Changes were especially evident in the ornamentation and details of new buildings rather than in their overall forms, though new building types were eventually introduced from European influences as well. The term "Turkish Rococo", or simply "Rococo", is also used to describe the Ottoman Baroque, or parts of it, due to the similarities and influences from the French Rococo style in particular, but this terminology varies from author to author.

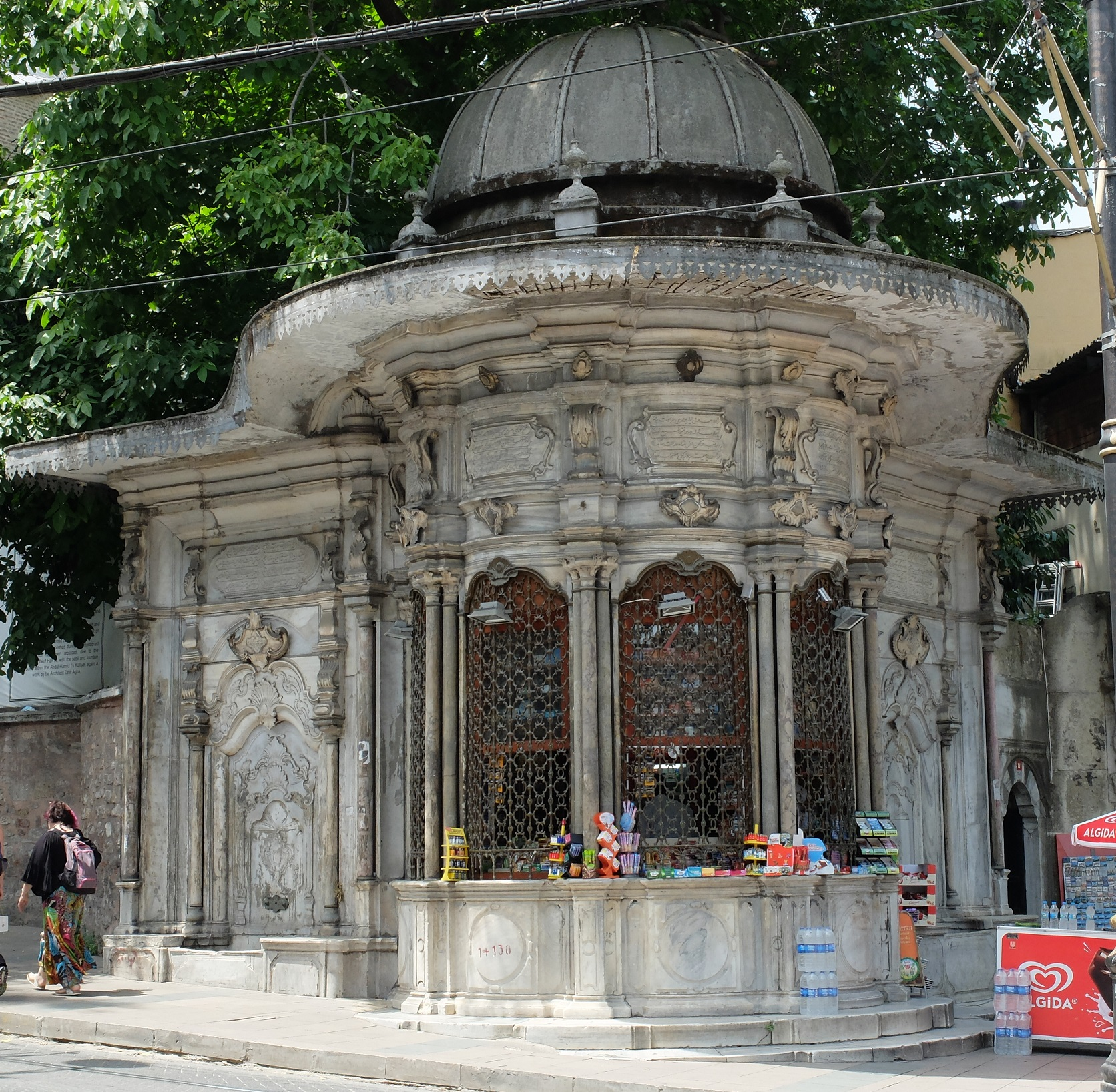
Sebil of Abdülhamid I, Istanbul (circa 1780)

The first structures to exhibit the new Baroque style are several fountains and sebils built by elite patrons in Istanbul in 1741–1742. The most important monument heralding the new Ottoman Baroque style is the Nuruosmaniye Mosque complex, begun by Mahmud I in October 1748 and completed by his successor, Osman III (to whom it is dedicated), in December 1755. Doğan Kuban describes it as the "most important monumental construction after the Selimiye Mosque in Edirne", marking the integration of European culture into Ottoman architecture and the rejection of the classical Ottoman style. It also marked the first time since the Sultan Ahmed Mosque (early 17th century) that an Ottoman sultan built his own imperial mosque complex in Istanbul, thus inaugurating the return of this tradition.

The Ayazma Mosque in Üsküdar was built between 1757–1758 and 1760–1761. It is essentially a smaller version of the Nuruosmaniye Mosque, signaling the importance of the latter as a new model to emulate. Although smaller, it is relatively tall for its proportions, enhancing its sense of height. This trend towards height was pursued in later mosques.

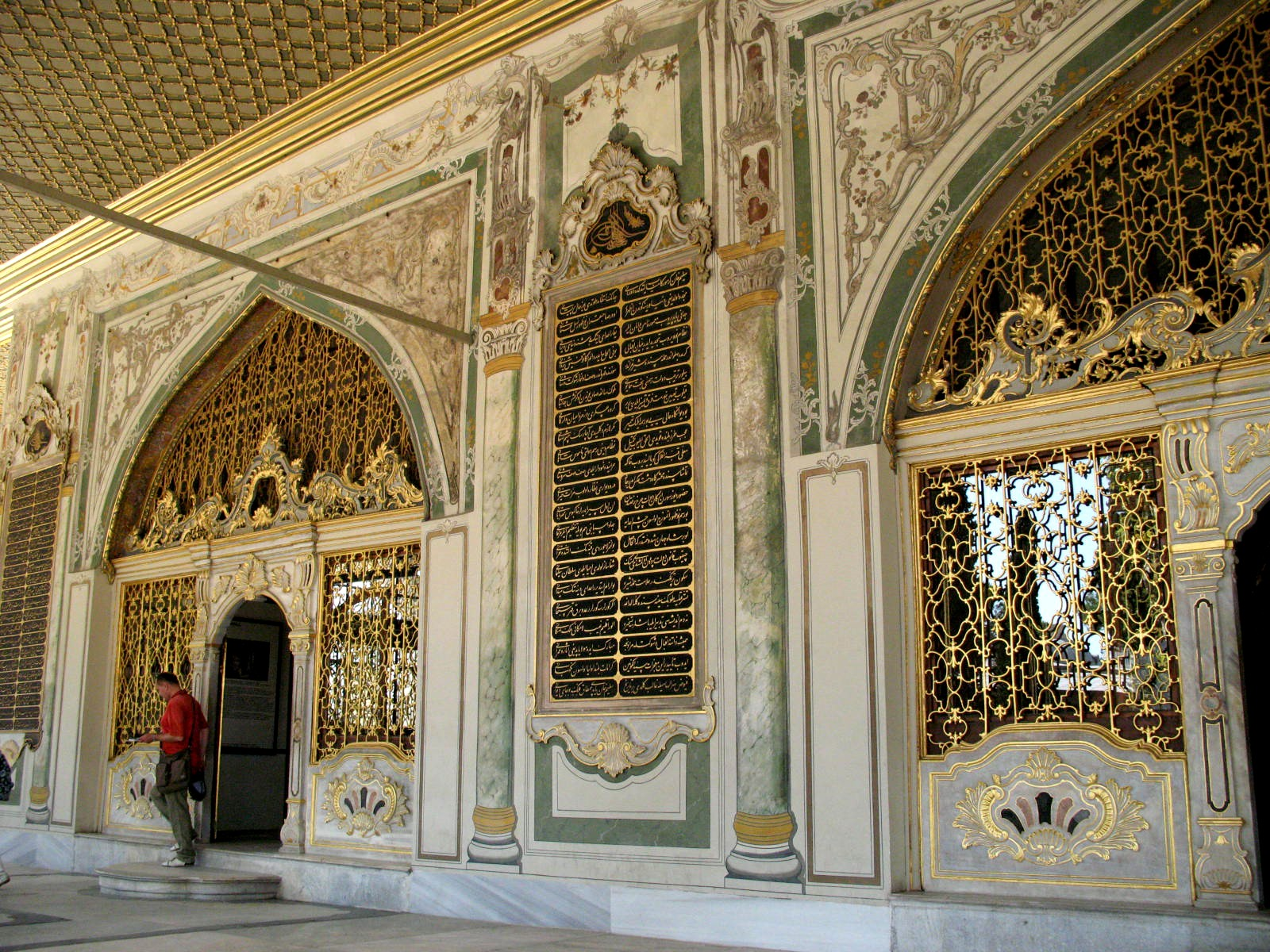
Baroque decoration on the exterior of the Imperial Council (Divan) Hall in Topkapı Palace

In Topkapı Palace, the Ottoman sultans and their family continued to build new rooms or remodel old ones throughout the 18th century, introducing Baroque and Rococo decoration in the process. Some examples include: the Baths of the Harem, renovated around 1744; the Sofa Kiosk (Sofa Köşkü), renovated in 1752; the Kiosk of Osman III, added in 1754–1755; and the Imperial Council (Divan) Hall, redecorated in 1792 and in 1819. As in the preceding centuries, other palaces were built around Istanbul by the sultan and his family. Previously, the traditional Ottoman palace configuration consisted of different buildings or pavilions arranged in a group, as was the case at Topkapı Palace, the Edirne Palace, and others. However, at some time during the 18th century there was a transition to palaces consisting of a single block or single large building. Moreover, the sultans increasingly favoured waterside residences and therefore built new palaces along the shores of the Golden Horn and the Bosphorus.

Beyond Istanbul, the greatest palaces were built by powerful local families, but they were often built in regional styles that did not follow the trends of the Ottoman capital. The Azm Palace in Damascus, for example, was built around 1750 in a largely Damascene style. In eastern Anatolia, near present-day Doğubayazıt, the Ishak Pasha Palace is an exceptional and flamboyant piece of architecture that mixes various local traditions including Seljuk Turkish, Armenian, and Georgian. It was begun in the 17th century and generally completed by 1784.

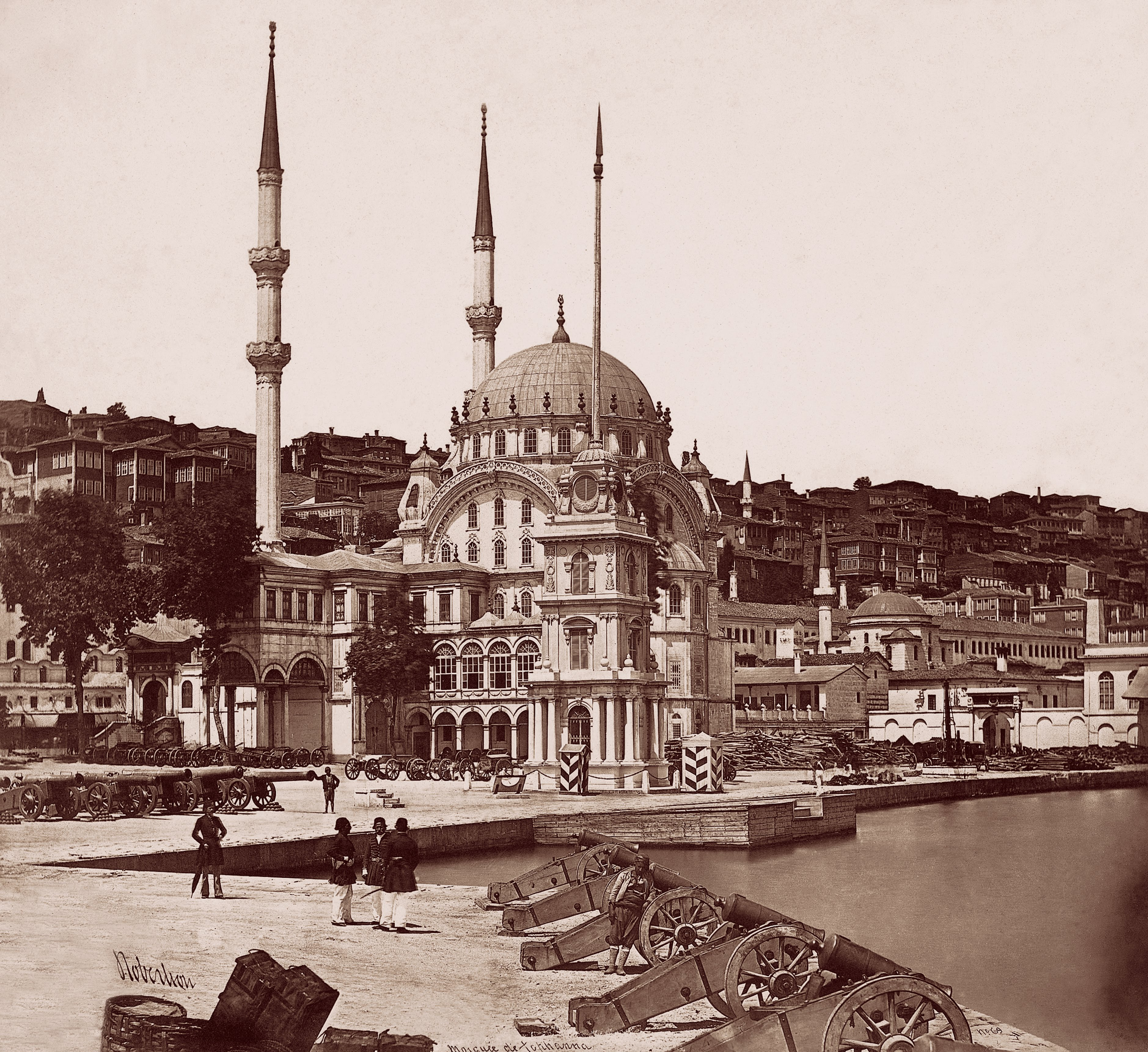
Nusretiye Mosque in Tophane, Istanbul (1822–1826)

The Nusretiye Mosque, Mahmud II's imperial mosque, was built between 1822 and 1826 at Tophane. The mosque is the first major imperial work by Krikor Balyan. It is sometimes described as belonging to the Empire style, but is considered by Godfrey Goodwin and Doğan Kuban as one of the last Baroque mosques, while Ünver Rüstem describes the style as moving away from the Baroque and towards an Ottoman interpretation of Neoclassicism. Goodwin also describes it as the last in a line of imperial mosques that started with the Nuruosmaniye. Despite its relatively small size, the mosque's tall proportions create a sense of height, which may be the culmination of a trend that began with the Ayazma Mosque.

== 19th century and early 20th century ==
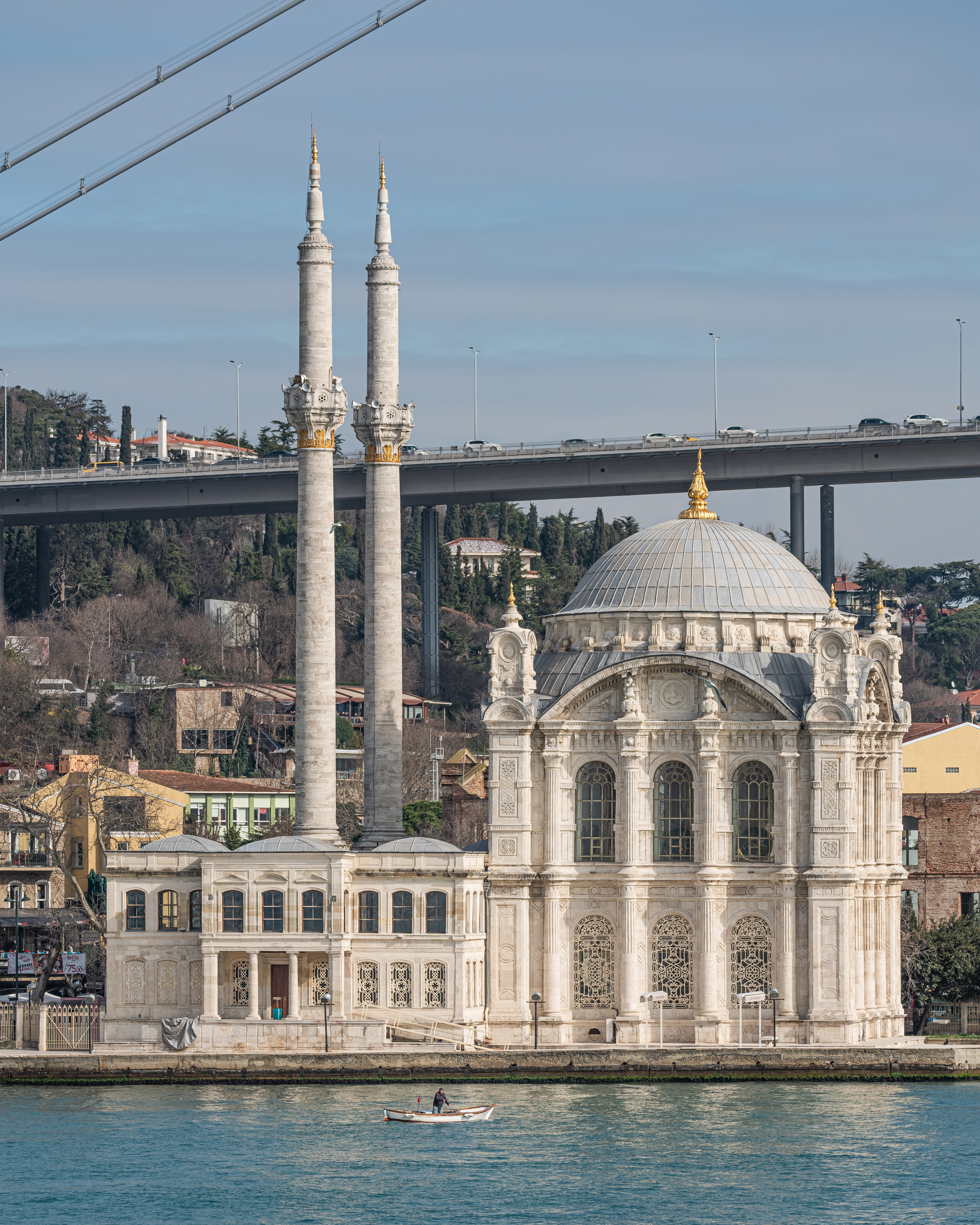
Ortaköy Mosque, Istanbul (1854–1856), one of many mosques in the 19th century designed with a mix of styles

During the reign of Mahmud II (r. 1808–1839) the Empire style, a Neoclassical style which originated in France under Napoleon, was introduced into Ottoman architecture. This marked a trend towards increasingly direct imitation of Western styles, particularly from France. The Tanzimat reforms that began in 1839 under Sultan Abdülmecid I sought to modernize the Ottoman Empire with Western-style reforms. In the architectural realm, this resulted in the dominance of European architects and Ottoman architects with European training. Among these, the Balyans, an Ottoman Armenian family, succeeded in dominating imperial architecture for much of the century. They were joined by European architects such as the Fossati brothers, William James Smith, and Alexandre Vallaury. After the early 19th century, Ottoman architecture was characterized by an eclectic architecture which mixed or borrowed from multiple styles. The Balyans, for example, commonly combined Neoclassical or Beaux-arts architecture with highly eclectic decoration. As more Europeans arrived in Istanbul, the neighbourhoods of Galata and Beyoğlu (or Pera) took on very European appearances.

A number of mosques built in the 19th century reflect these trends, such as the Ortaköy Mosque and the Pertevniyal Valide Mosque in Istanbul. The Tanzimat reforms also granted Christians and Jews the right to freely build new centers of worship, which resulted in new constructions, renovations, and expansions of churches and synagogues. Most of these followed the same eclecticism that prevailed in the rest of Ottoman architecture of the 19th century.

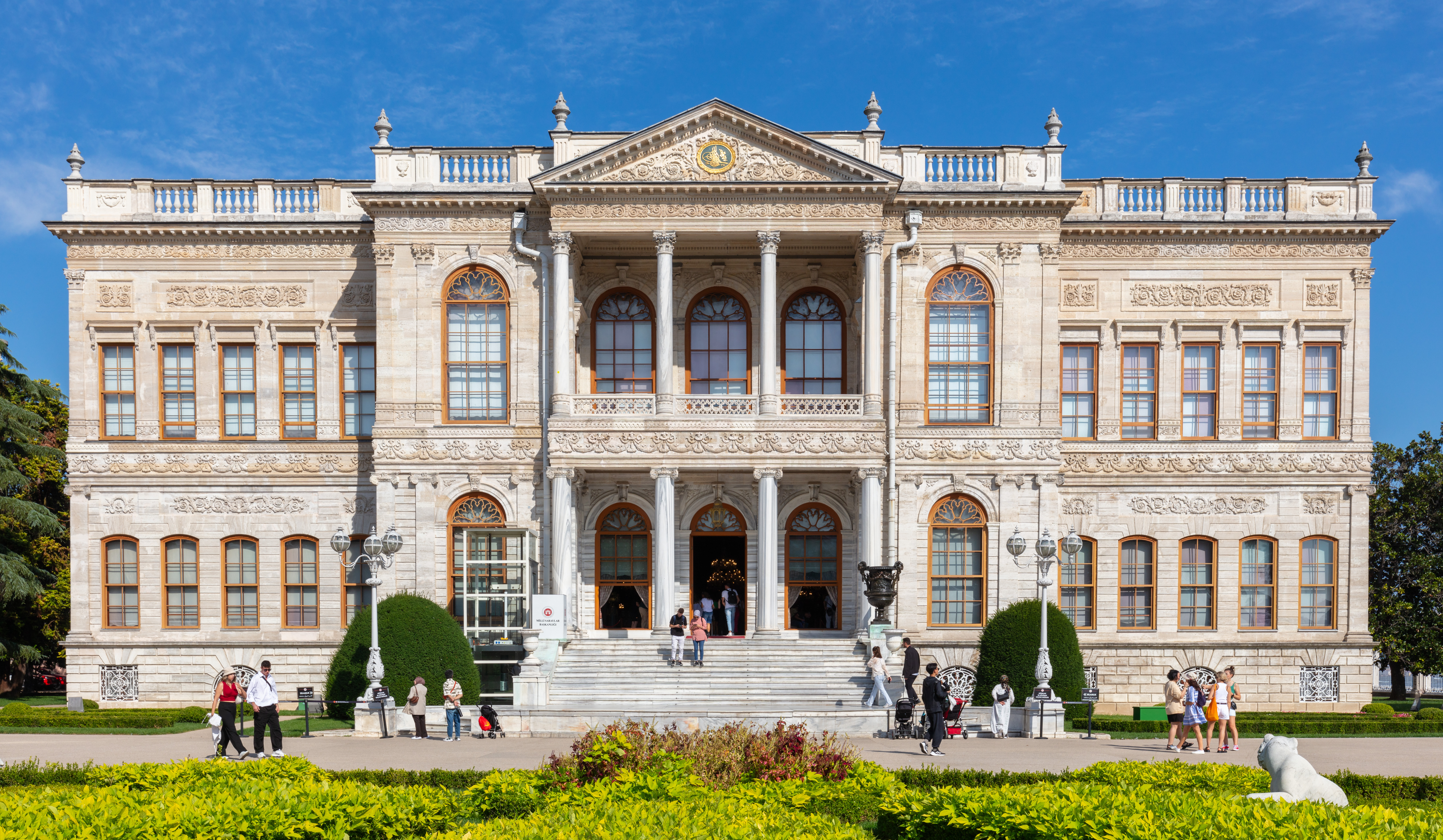
The Dolmabahçe Palace (1842–1856), on the shore of the Bosphorus, was built to serve as the new imperial palace of the Ottoman dynasty

Many palaces, residences, and leisure pavilions were built in the 19th century, most of them in the Bosphorus suburbs of Istanbul. The most significant is the Dolmabahçe Palace, constructed for Abdülmecid I between 1842 and 1856. It replaced the Topkapı Palace as the official imperial residence of the sultan. The palace consists mainly of a single building with monumental proportions, which represented a radical rejection of traditional Ottoman palace design. The style of the palace is fundamentally Neoclassical but is characterized by a highly eclectic decoration that mixes Baroque motifs with other styles.

Various new types of monuments were also introduced to Ottoman architecture during this era. For example, clock towers rose to prominence over the 19th century. The construction of railway stations was a feature of Ottoman modernisation reflecting the new infrastructure changes within the empire. The most famous example is the Sirkeci Railway Station, built in 1888–1890 as the terminus of the Orient Express. It was designed in an Orientalist style by German architect August Jasmund (also spelled "Jachmund"). In the Beyoğlu district of Istanbul, Parisian-style shopping arcades appeared in the 19th century. Some consisted of a small courtyard filled with shops and surrounded by buildings, while others were simply a passage or alley (pasaj in Turkish) lined with shops, sometimes covered by a glass roof. Other commercial building types that appeared in the late 19th century included hotels and banks.

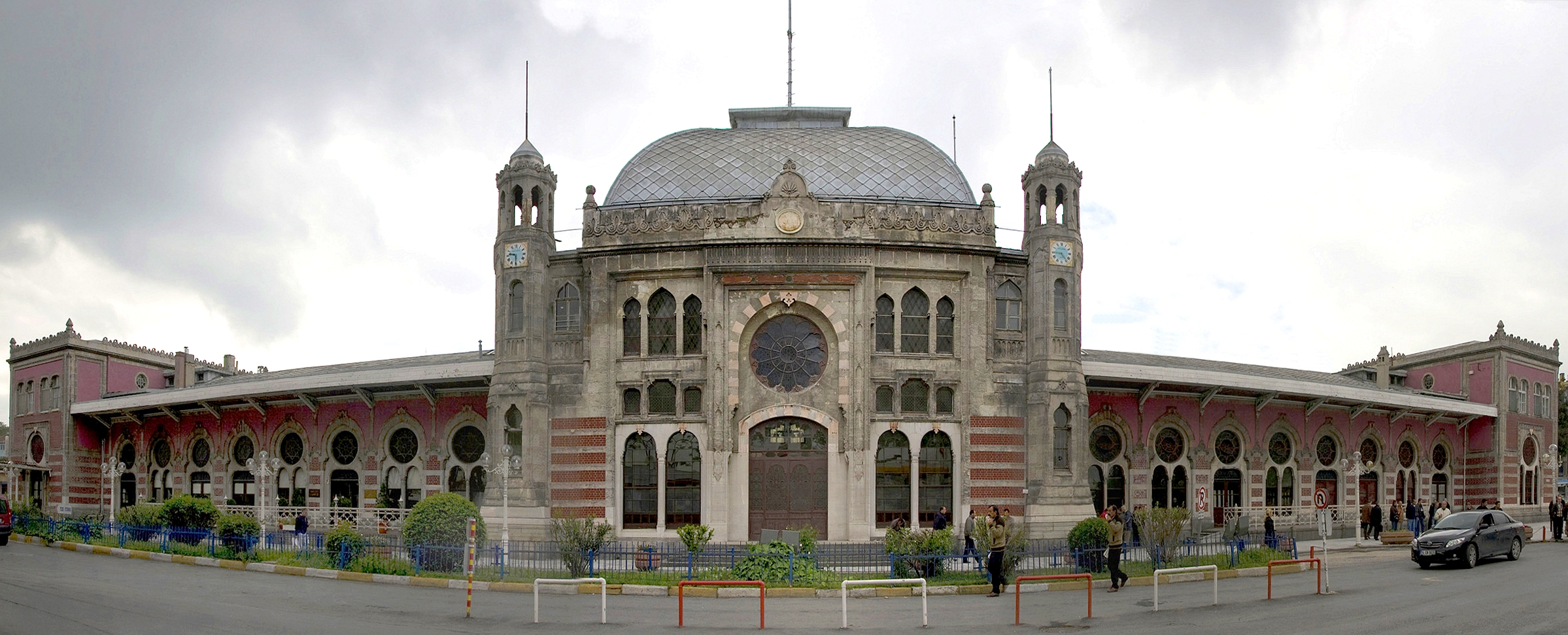
The Sirkeci Railway Station in Istanbul (1888–1890), designed in Orientalist style

A local interpretation of Orientalist fashion steadily arose in the late 19th century, initially used by European architects such as Vallaury. This trend combined "neo-Ottoman" motifs with other motifs from wider Islamic architecture. The eclecticism and European imports of the 19th century eventually led to the introduction of Art Nouveau, especially after the arrival of Raimondo D'Aronco in the late 19th century. D'Aronco came at the invitation of Sultan Abdülhamid II and served as chief court architect between 1896 and 1909. Istanbul became a new center of Art Nouveau and a local flavour of the style developed. The new style was most prevalent in the new apartment buildings being built in Istanbul at the time.

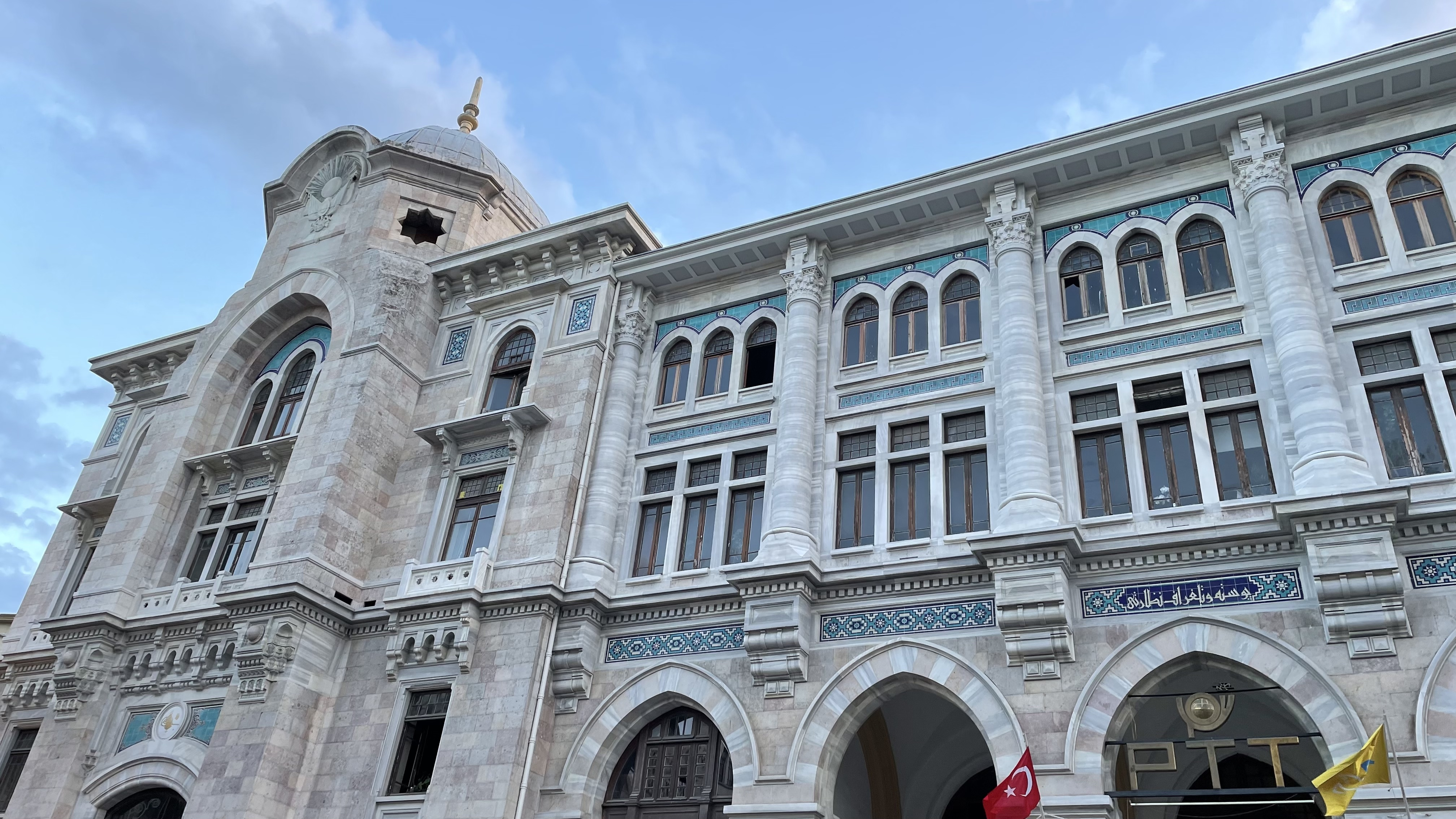
The Grand Post Office in Sirkeci, Istanbul, is one of the earliest Ottoman Revival buildings that marked the First national architectural movement (1909)

The final period of architecture in the Ottoman Empire developed after 1900 and in particular after the Young Turks took power in 1908–1909, in what was then called the "National Architectural Renaissance" and since referred to as the First national architectural movement of Turkish architecture. The approach in this period was an Ottoman Revival style, a reaction to influences in the previous 200 years that had come to be considered "foreign", such as Baroque and Neoclassical architecture, and was intended to promote Ottoman patriotism and self-identity. This was related to earlier Ottoman architecture in rather the same manner as other roughly contemporaneous revivalist architectures related to their stylistic inspirations. New government-run institutions that trained architects and engineers, established in the late 19th century and further centralized under the Young Turks, became instrumental in disseminating this "national style".

== Dome design ==
Basic schematic illustration of a dome with four pendentives

The dome was a paramount feature of Ottoman architecture for most of its history. In religious architecture, the dome and the integration of the interior with the central domed space could be a symbol for the "oneness of God" (tawhid). Especially after Sinan, the design of monumental Ottoman buildings was conceptualized with the central dome above as its starting point, rather than the floor plan being conceived first and the roofing system after. Under Sinan, the core of the design was more specifically the domed baldaquin, which is to say the dome and its basic structural support system: a set of pillars or buttresses in a square, hexagonal, or octagonal configuration – involving four, six, or eight pillars, respectively. Thanks to the influence of the Hagia Sophia and early Ottoman mosque designs, the central dome was often accompanied with semi-domes and the transition from the base of the dome to the space below was typically accomplished through pendentives. The focus on the central dome also led Ottoman architects to emphasize verticality in their designs.

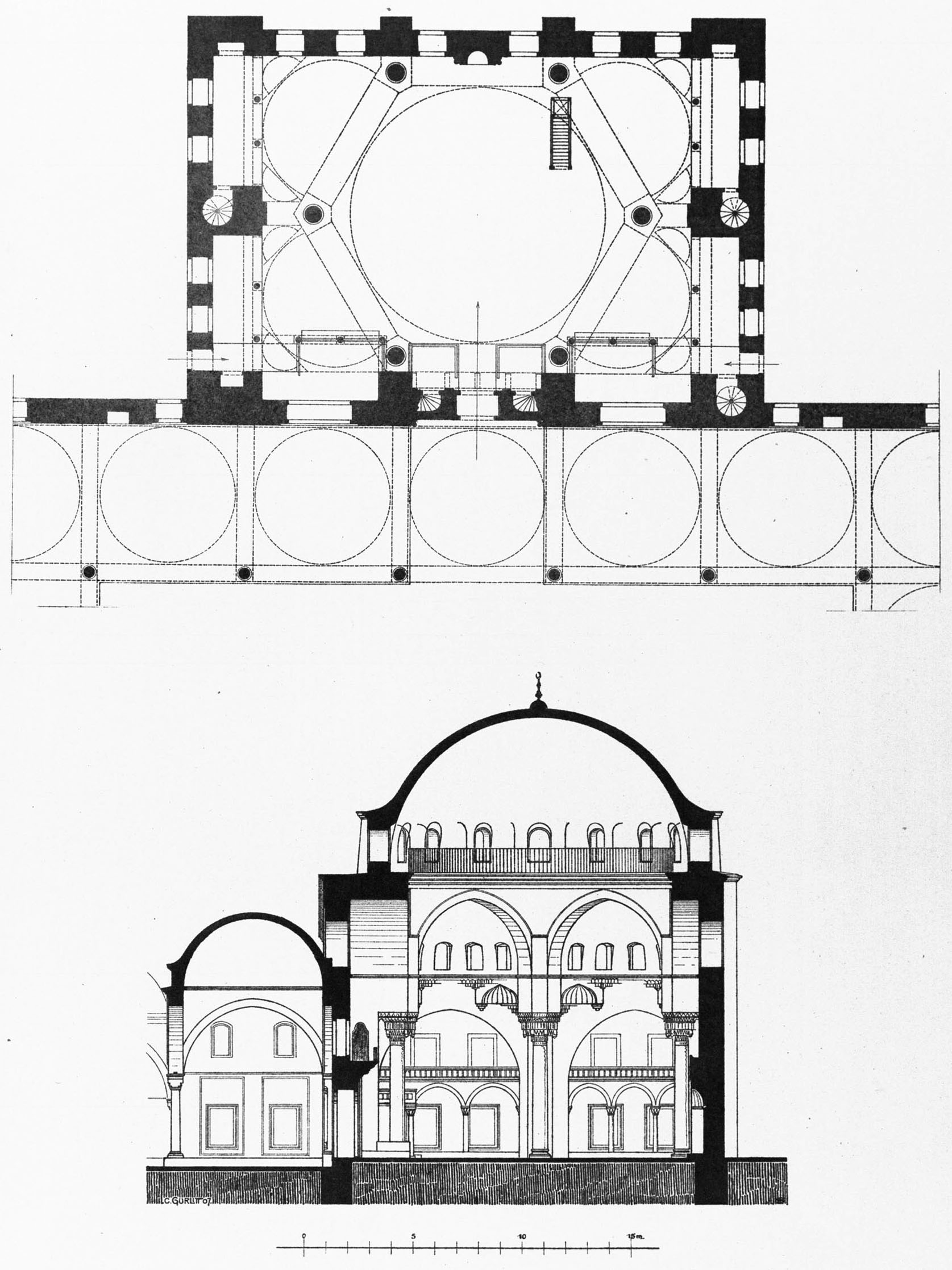
Plan and elevation of the Kara Ahmed Pasha Mosque (1554), showing a hexagonal baldaquin support for the main dome, one of several designs Sinan experimented with.

The dome itself remained geometrically simple in Ottoman architecture. While many different types of domes had previously developed in Islamic architecture and while contemporary European architecture experimented with ostentatious dome constructions, Ottoman architects consistently used simple hemispheric domes. Sinan knew of double-shelled domes, which were used in earlier Islamic architecture, and he employed them in the Mausoleum of Suleiman and in multiple other mausoleums. Nonetheless, they were not the norm and the Ottomans more regularly used single-shelled domes in almost every context. For example, the huge dome of Sinan's masterpiece, the Selimiye Mosque in Edirne, is a single-shelled construction. When double-shelled domes were used, the outer and inner shells had the same shape, thus maintaining the same profile on the outside as on the inside. Ottoman domes were not raised on prominent drums, unlike their Byzantine predecessors, but their outer edge usually rested on a circle of alternating buttresses and windows.

Since the early Ottoman period, domes were usually built with brick, a material that was convenient for this purpose because it was relatively light. This remained the usual practice even after stone replaced brick as the main material for walls after the early period. Wood was used for the centring during construction. On the outside, early domes were commonly covered with terracotta tiles but by the 16th century they were generally covered with lead.

== Decoration ==
=== Tile decoration ===
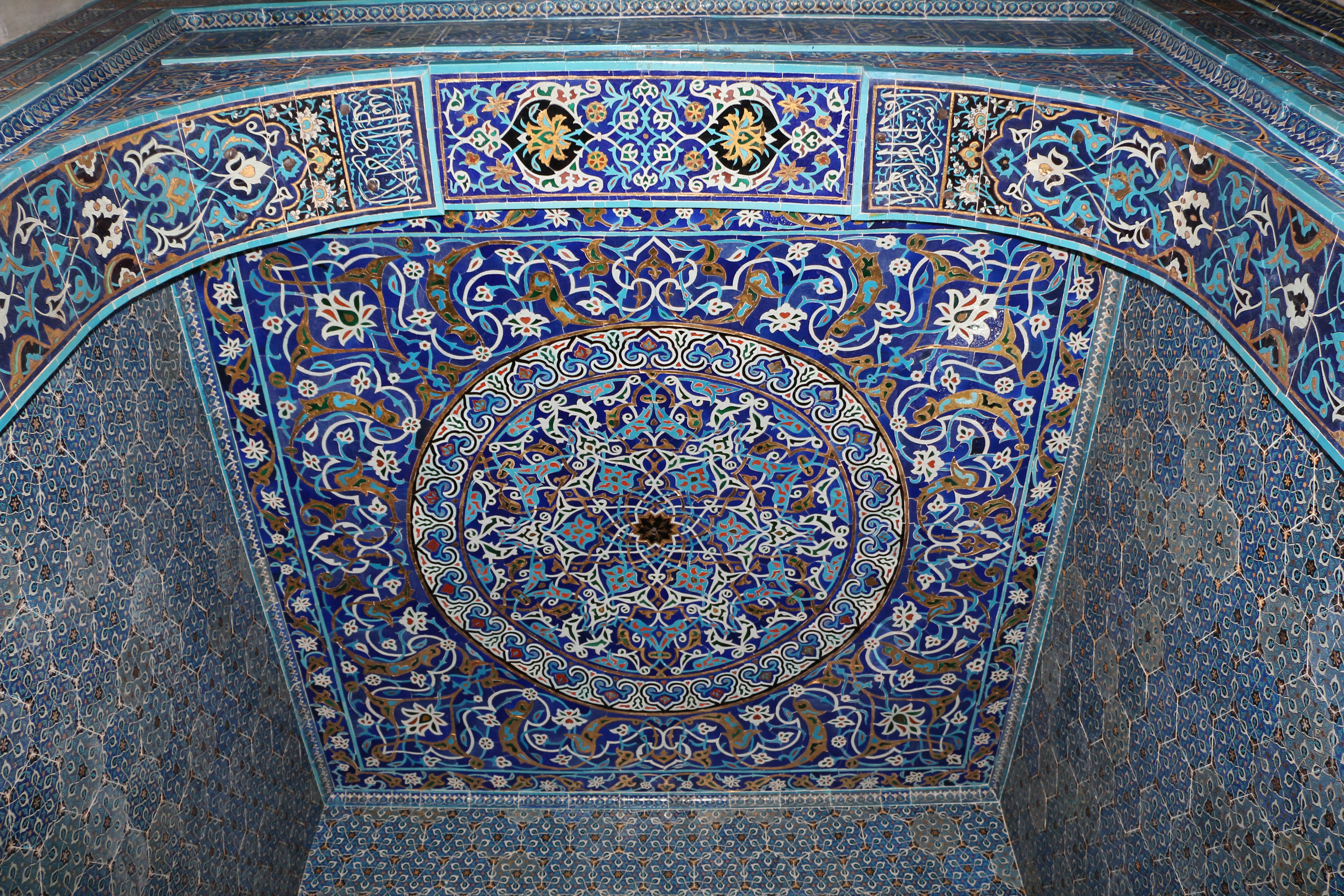
Early cuerda seca tile decoration with arabesque motifs in the Green Mosque in Bursa (1424)

Glazed tile decoration in the cuerda seca technique was used in early Ottoman monuments. The most extensive example is the Green Mosque and the associated Green Tomb in Bursa (early 15th century). The tiles of the Green Mosque complex generally have a deep green ground mixed with combinations of blue, white, and yellow forming arabesque motifs. A large portion of the tiles are cut into hexagonal and triangular shapes that were then fitted together to form murals. The artistic style of these tiles – and of other early Ottoman art – was influenced by an "International Timurid" taste that emerged from the intense artistic patronage of the Timurids, who controlled a large empire across the Middle East and Central Asia.

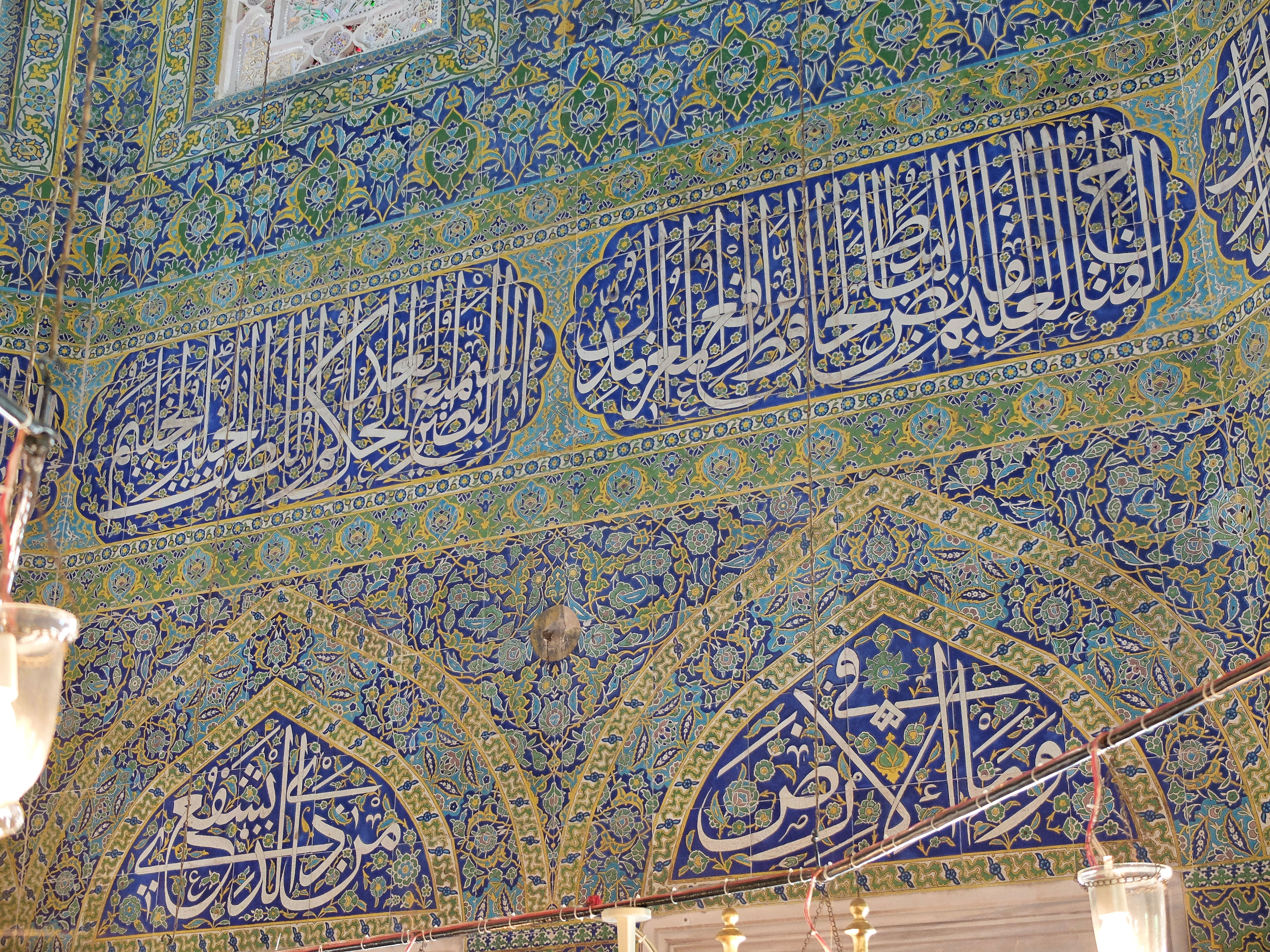
Cuerda seca tilework in the tomb of Şehzade Mehmed (1548)

Another stage in Ottoman tiles is evident in the surviving tiles of the Fatih Mosque (1463–1470) and in the Selim I Mosque (1520–1522). In these mosques the windows are topped by lunettes filled with cuerda seca tiles with motifs in green, turquoise, cobalt blue, and yellow. Chinese motifs such as dragons and clouds also appear for the first time on similar tiles in Selim I's tomb, built behind his mosque in 1523. A more extravagant example of this type of tilework can be found inside the tomb of Şehzade Mehmed in the cemetery of the Şehzade Mosque (1548).

By the late 15th century, the ceramic industry in the city of İznik was growing and began producing a new "blue-and-white" fritware which adapted and incorporated Chinese motifs in its decoration. The most extraordinary tiles from this stage are a series of panels on the exterior of Circumcision Pavilion (Sünnet Odası) in Topkapı Palace. At least some of these tiles are believed to date from the 1520s and feature large floral motifs in blue, white, and turquoise. They exemplify the advent of the saz style: a style of motif that appeared the 16th century and featured a variety of flowers attached to gracefully curving stems with serrated leaves. This continued to reflect earlier influences of the "International Timurid" style but also demonstrates the development of an increasingly distinct Ottoman artistic style at this time.

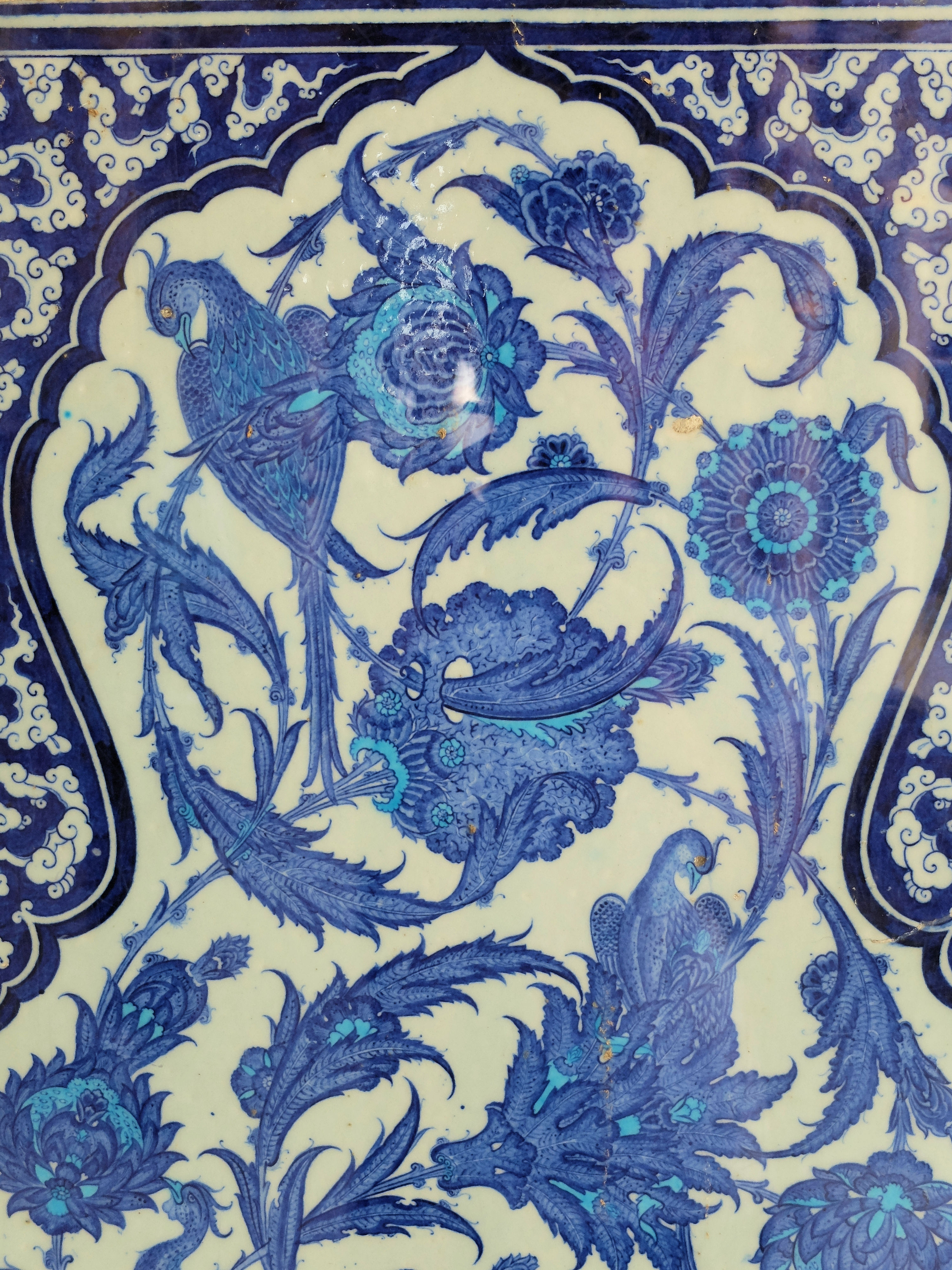
Details of blue-and-white tiles (early 16th century) on the exterior of the Circumcision Room in Topkapı Palace, which exemplify the newer saz style

The architect Mimar Sinan generally used tile decoration in a fairly restrained manner and seems to have preferred focusing on the architecture as a whole rather than on overwhelming decoration. An exception to this austerity is the extensive tilework in the Rüstem Pasha Mosque (1561–1562), which also marks the beginning of the artistic peak of Iznik ceramic art from the 1560s onward. Blue colours predominate, but the important "tomato red" colour began to make an appearance. The repertoire of motifs includes tulips, hyacinths, carnations, roses, pomegranates, artichoke leaves, narcissus, and Chinese "cloud" motifs. Larger tile murals became more common in Ottoman buildings and thus square tiles, which were more suitable for this purpose, had become the norm instead of the hexagonal tiles of the older Iranian tradition. Other examples of buildings featuring Iznik tile art in its prime include the Sokollu Mehmed Pasha Mosque (1568–1572), the Piyale Pasha Mosque (1574), the tomb of Selim II (1576), the tomb of Murad III (1595), and some parts of the Topkapı Palace.

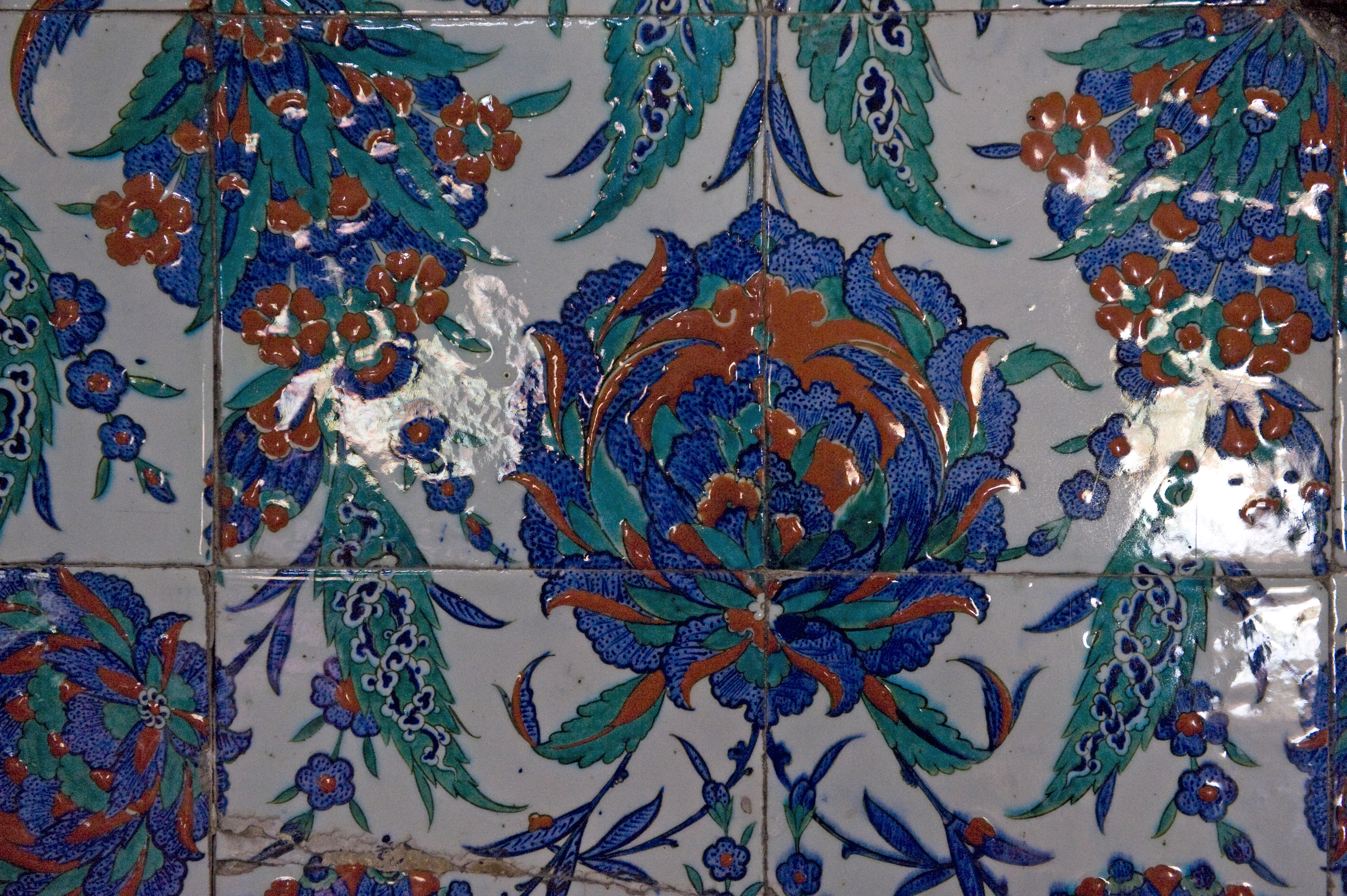
Details of tiles at the Sokullu Mehmed Pasha Mosque in Istanbul (1572), produced during the artistic apogee of Iznik tiles

In the early 17th century, some features of 16th-century Iznik art began to fade, such as the use of embossed tomato red. At the same time, some motifs became more rigidly geometric and stylized. Production was pushed to the limit for the enormous Sultan Ahmed Mosque (or "Blue Mosque"), begun in 1609 and inaugurated in 1617, which contains the richest collection of tilework of any Ottoman mosque. According to official Ottoman documents it contained as many as 20,000 tiles. While the craftsmen at Iznik were still capable of producing rich and colourful tiles throughout the 17th century, there was an overall decline in quality. Some of the production continued in the city of Kütahya instead of Iznik, but tile manufacture declined further in the second half of this century. By this period, blue and turquoise colours increasingly predominated and many commissioned works limited their patterns to single tiles instead of creating larger patterns across multiple tiles. Tile production in Iznik came to an end in the 18th century.

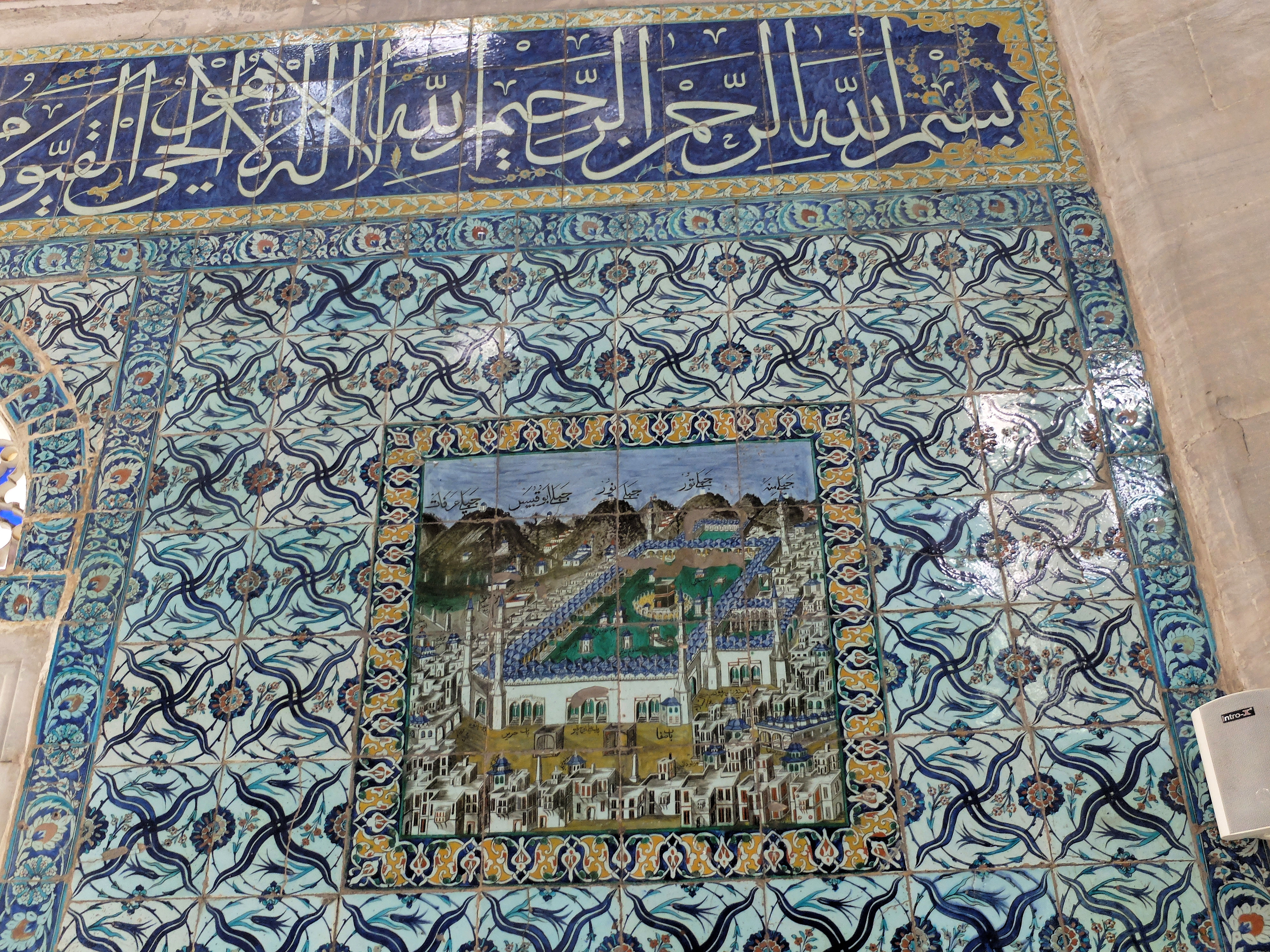
Tekfursaray tiles in the Hekimoğlu Ali Paşa Mosque (1734), including a depiction of the Great Mosque of Mecca

The shortage of quality tiles in the 18th century caused Iznik tiles from older buildings to be reused and moved to new ones on multiple occasions. Ahmed III and his grand vizier attempted to revive the tile industry by establishing a new workshop between 1719 and 1724 at Tekfursaray in Istanbul. Production continued here for a while but the quality was not comparable to earlier Iznik tiles. Pottery production also continued and even increased at Kütahya, where new styles developed alongside imitations of older classical Ottoman designs. The colours of tiles in this period were mostly turquoise and dark cobalt blue, while a brownish-red, yellow, and a deep green also appeared. The background was often discoloured, colours often ran together slightly, and the patterns were typically limited to single tiles. The Tekfursaray kilns ceased to function after 1730, when the Patrona Halil rebellion deposed Ahmed III. Ultimately, tile decoration in Ottoman architecture lost its significance during this century.

=== Painted decoration ===
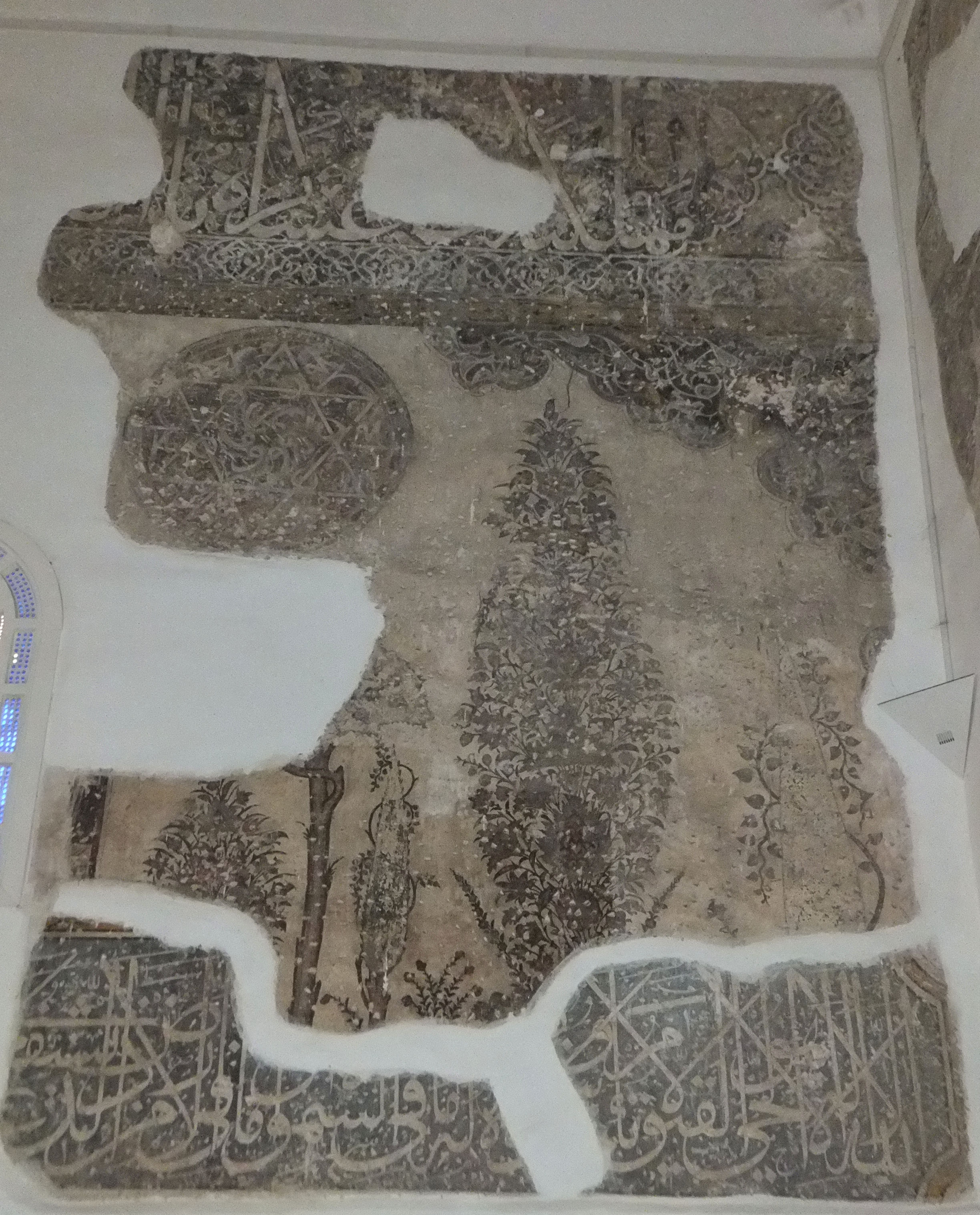
Partially preserved mural decoration inside the Murad II Mosque in Edirne, circa 1436, depicting stylized trees and plants alongside calligraphic inscriptions

Painted decoration was an essential part of the decoration of Ottoman buildings. It covered interior walls, ceilings, and domes. However, very little original painted decoration has been preserved in Ottoman buildings as they were frequently repainted during later restorations. Paint, as well as gold leaf, was applied on a variety of mediums including plaster, wood, leather or cloth, and stone. For plaster decoration, there were generally two types: kalemişi and malakâri. The first refers to paint being applied directly to plaster, while the second referred to applying paint onto relief decoration sculpted beforehand.

The motifs of painted decoration were typically similar to those used in other contemporary arts, such as manuscript illumination. Early examples indicate that Ottoman decoration developed a preference for floriate motifs. One such motif that was popular throughout the history of Ottoman art is the rumî style, whose existence predates the Ottomans. It consists of scrolling, spiraling, and/or intertwining stems with stylized leaves. Another floriate style that appeared in Ottoman decoration from the 15th century onward is hatayî, which largely depicts peonies and leaves in varying stages of budding and blooming. This style had its origins further east in China or Turkestan and it appeared in Islamic art from the 13th century onward. One of the most important examples of early Ottoman painted decoration is the partially-preserved mural decoration inside the Murad II Mosque in Edirne, which still dates back to its construction circa 1436 and depicts natural landscapes with stylized flowers and trees. These appear to reflect the same artistic styles used in book illustrations and miniatures, particularly those from the Timurid Empire further east.

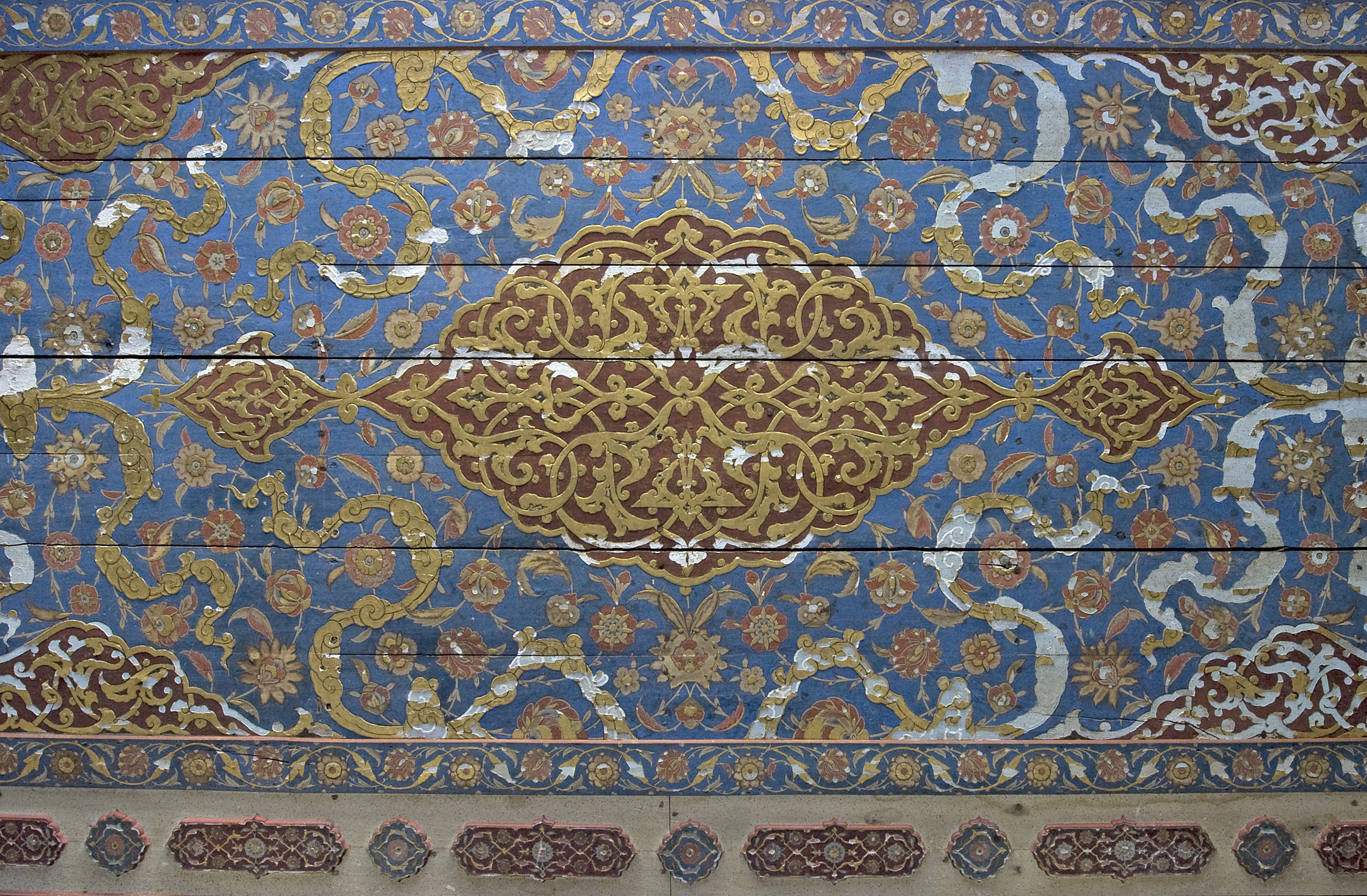
A painted wooden ceiling under the gallery of the Kara Ahmed Pasha Mosque in Istanbul, circa 1554. This mixes a number of design elements including a central medallion, saz-style motifs, and "Chinese clouds".

In the second quarter of the 16th century, the saz style (also mentioned above for tile decoration) was developed by Ottoman artist Şahkulu. It was derived from the hatayî style and added new motifs, most notably large serrated leaves. It was less formal and geometrically rigid, allowing these motifs to be combined and arranged in a wide variety of ways to fill any space.

The most monumental painted compositions were employed in and around the domes and semi-domes of Ottoman buildings. For much of the Ottoman era, the center of domes were typically decorated with a circular medallion-like composition that was filled with a calligraphic rendition of Qur'anic verses. The motif of the central medallion radiated outward to cover the rest of the dome, with the details filled by rumî, hatayî, or saz motifs. This type of dome decoration is well-known from the 16th century onward but it probably had appeared earlier in the 15th century as well.

In the later 17th century, painted decoration underwent a gradual shift in style that can be attributed to European influence. Among other trends, shading was introduced to what had previously been areas of flat colour. Around the same time (in the second half of the 17th century), a new style known as Edirnekārī began to appear. It primarily depicted flowers, a traditional Ottoman motif, but with an increased level of naturalism not previously seen in Ottoman art. The reign of Ahmed III (r. 1703–1730), which include the years of the Tulip Period (1718–1730), saw the popularization of a style derived from this, featuring plentiful depictions of flowers in vases and bowls of fruit, sometimes with shading. The most vivid example of this is the so-called Fruit Room, created by Ahmed III inside Topkapı Palace in 1705.

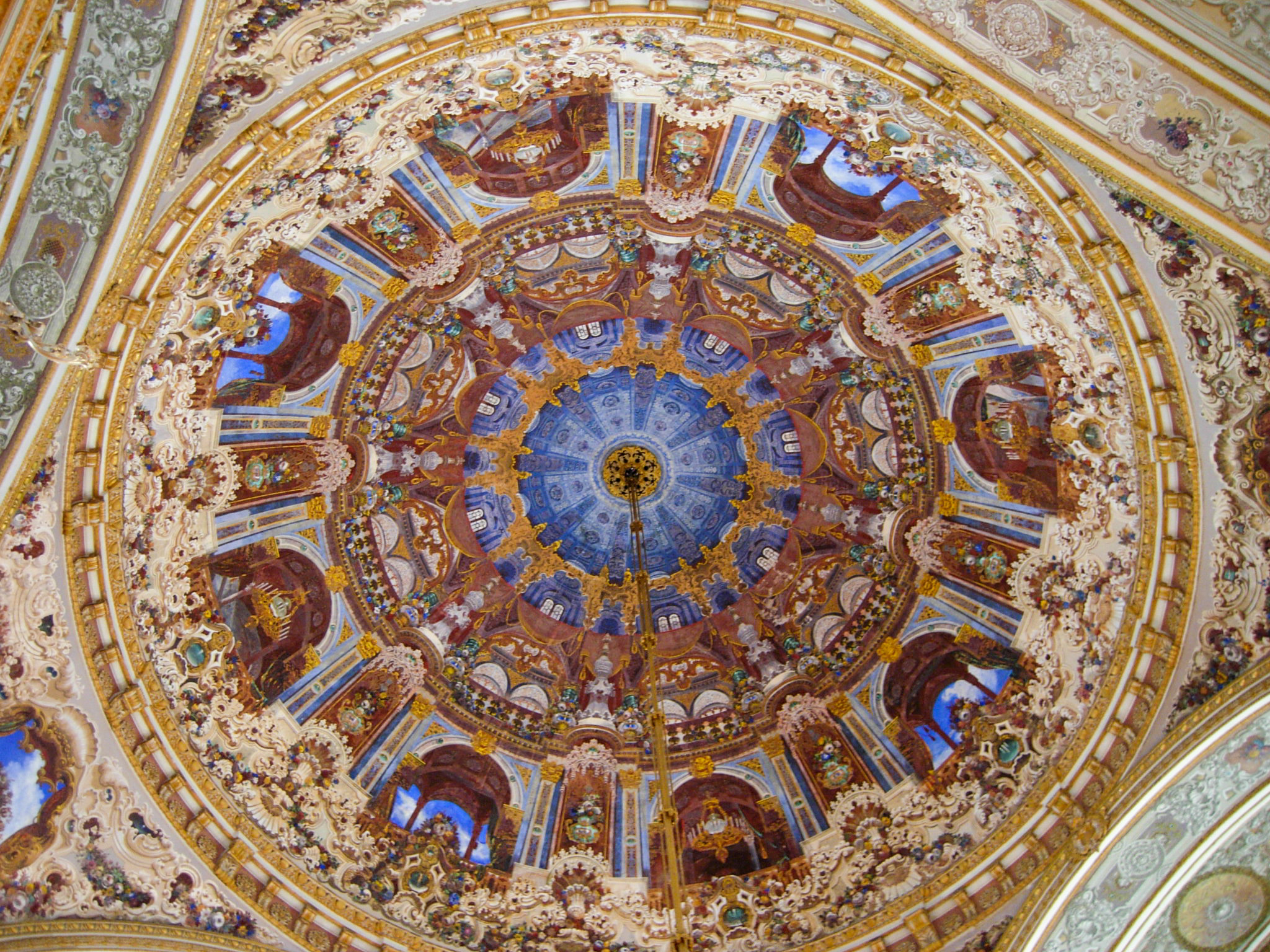
Dome of the Ceremonial Hall in the Dolmabahçe Palace in Istanbul (1842–1856), painted with trompe-l'œil

The advent of the Ottoman Baroque architectural style in the 1740s also brought new motifs of European origin or influence. By the end of the 18th century, European influence continued to grow and the new repertoire of motifs included garlands, ribbons, flower bouquets, and baskets of roses. Decoration could now be painted to appear three-dimensional, adding a new visual effect even when otherwise traditional motifs were used. The trompe-l'œil technique was also introduced, particularly during the reign of Abdülmecid I (r. 1839–1861). Examples of this technique can be seen inside the Ortaköy Mosque (1850s) and the Dolmabahçe Palace (1842–1856).

=== Stone carving ===
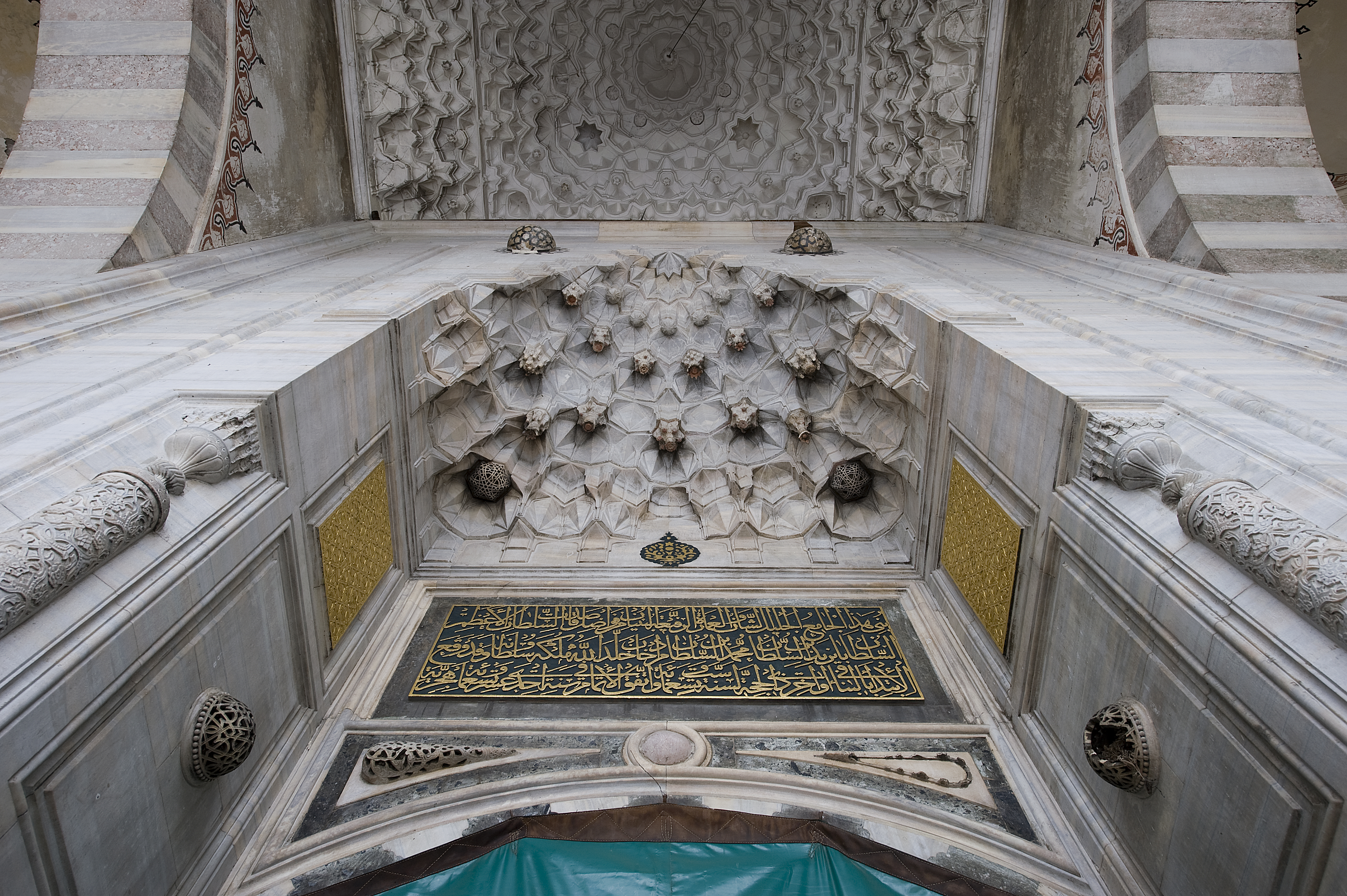
Entrance portal with muqarnas vaults, inscription panels, and other carved stonework at the Bayezid II Mosque in Istanbul (1500–1505)

Compared to the Anatolian Seljuk architecture that came before it, Ottoman architecture treated stone carving as a less important decorative medium. In the early Ottoman period, an exception to this paucity of traditional stone carving is the Green Mosque in Bursa, which features skilled carving of marble surfaces into vegetal arabesque and calligraphic motifs. This was generally not repeated in subsequent Ottoman monuments, with the partial exception of mihrabs.

Nonetheless, high-quality stone carving was still used to enrich the details of buildings throughout the Ottoman period, particularly for entrance portals, minaret balconies, niches, column capitals, and moldings. One of the main decorative techniques in this medium was muqarnas (or "stalactite") carving, which is used in all of these aforementioned elements. Since the Seljuk era, muqarnas semi-vaults had been a typical feature of entrance portals and mihrabs, and this tradition continued in Ottoman mosques.

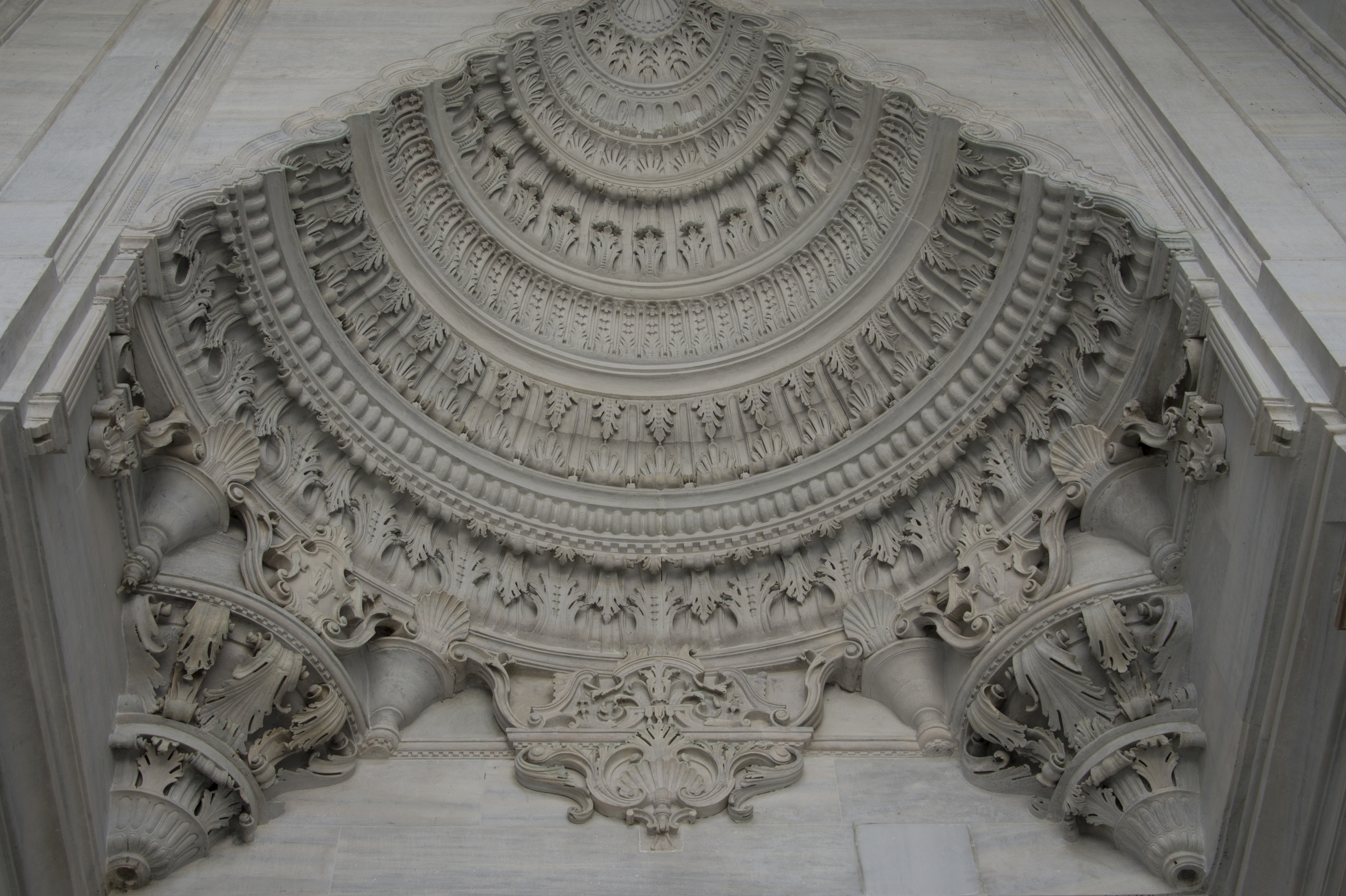
Entrance portal at the Nuruosmaniye Mosque in Istanbul (1748–1755), where traditional muqarnas has been replaced with baroque-style moldings and acanthus friezes

In the early 18th century, around the Tulip Period, diverse new floral motifs were added to the decorative repertoire of buildings. These can be found in carved reliefs, employed most prolifically on the façades of fountains and sebils, which became common types of monuments commissioned during this century. The motifs include flowers, fruits, garlands, and rosettes, as well as designs developed from the hatayî style previously used for painted decoration.

With the advent of the Ottoman Baroque in the mid 18th century, Ottoman stone carving borrowed motifs directly from the relief ornamentation of French Rococo architecture, including acanthus leaves, shells, baroque moldings, and mixtilinear arch forms. Although many novelties were introduced, one traditional feature that continued throughout this period were the calligraphic inscriptions placed in panels over gates, in friezes, and in other prominent locations.

== Houses ==
Beyond the architecture of Ottoman royal palaces, vernacular house architecture varied greatly across the Ottoman Empire according to regional climates, geography, and existing architectural traditions. The style of house or private mansion (konak) most commonly associated with the Ottoman period is found mainly in central and western Anatolia, in Istanbul, and in the Balkan peninsula. This type has foundations or a ground floor built in stone or brick, above which are one or two stories built in timber frame with other materials as infill, and a sloping roof. The upper floor, built in lighter materials, could accommodate more windows and its rooms could project over the street below. The most characteristic feature of the floor plan is a central hall or salon (the sofa or hayat) through which other rooms could be accessed. The exact configuration varied; for example, the main hall could be a long room with a single axis and smaller rooms around the sides, or it could be "T"-shaped or cross-shaped with other rooms occupying the corners.

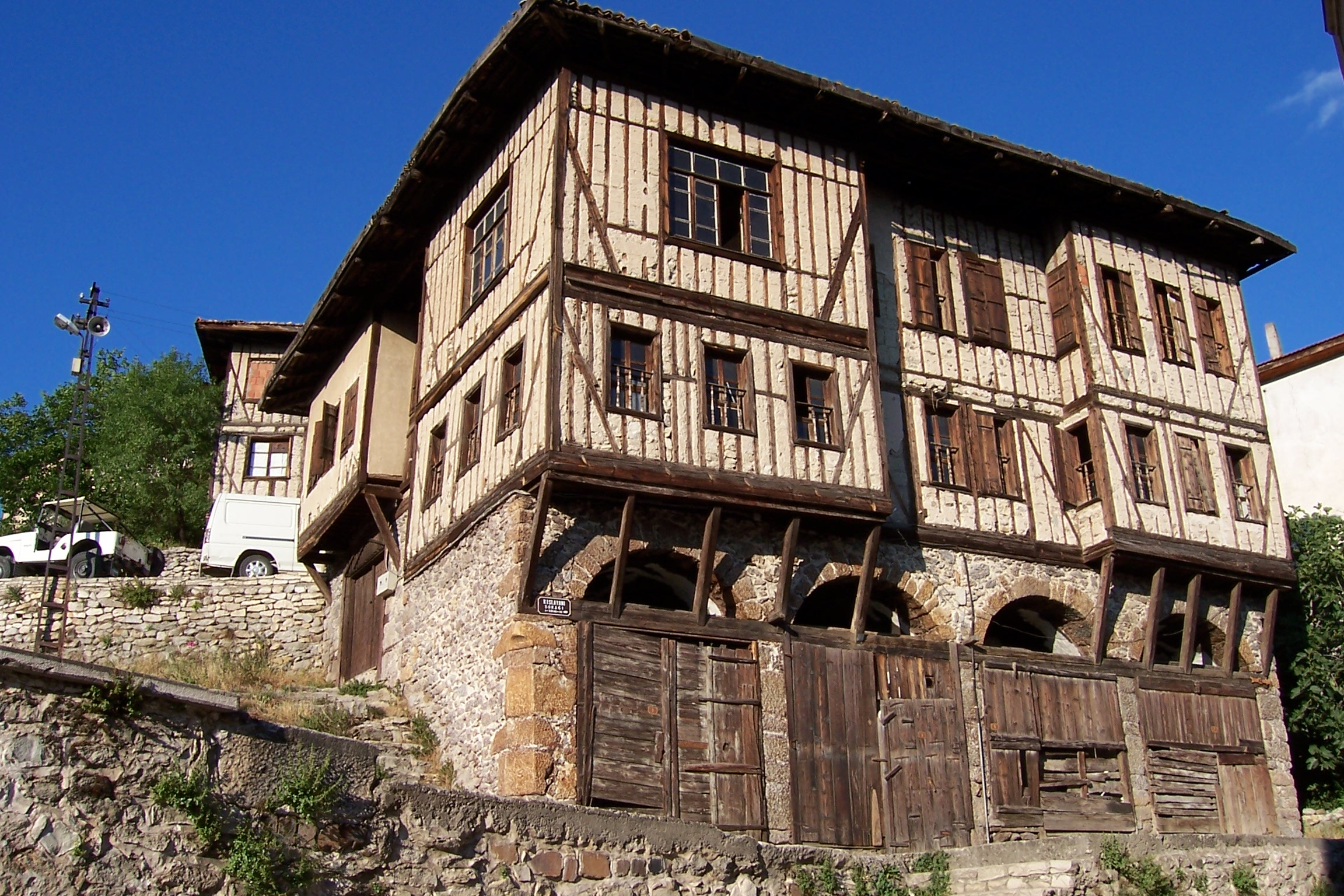
Traditional Ottoman house in Safranbolu

One of the corner rooms in the upper floor could function as a reception room. Receptions rooms are larger, more decorated, and have views over the street outside. Rooms are often divided between two areas: a small entry area, whose floor was at the same level as the central main hall, and the rest of the room, whose floor is raised slightly above the entry and where guests could sit. The most richly decorated element is often the wooden ceiling and the center of the main hall sometimes features a shallow dome. The walls of rooms can be occupied by windows, a fireplace (ocak), a long continuous seat (sedir), built-in cupboards, or niches for storing lamps, vases, and water jugs.

The origins of this traditional Ottoman house are unclear and have been the subject of debate by scholars. The vast majority of surviving Ottoman houses date from the 19th century, making it difficult to trace earlier developments. Doğan Kuban notes that some early documentary evidence alludes to houses with some of these characteristic Ottoman elements and he suggests that their style originated in the 15th or 16th century. In Anatolia and more rural locations, the main hall is often oriented towards the outside by opening onto a garden or courtyard. In urban centres such as Istanbul, the main hall is usually more central, interior-focused, and has a cross shape. This urban style likely developed later and eventually spread beyond the capital.

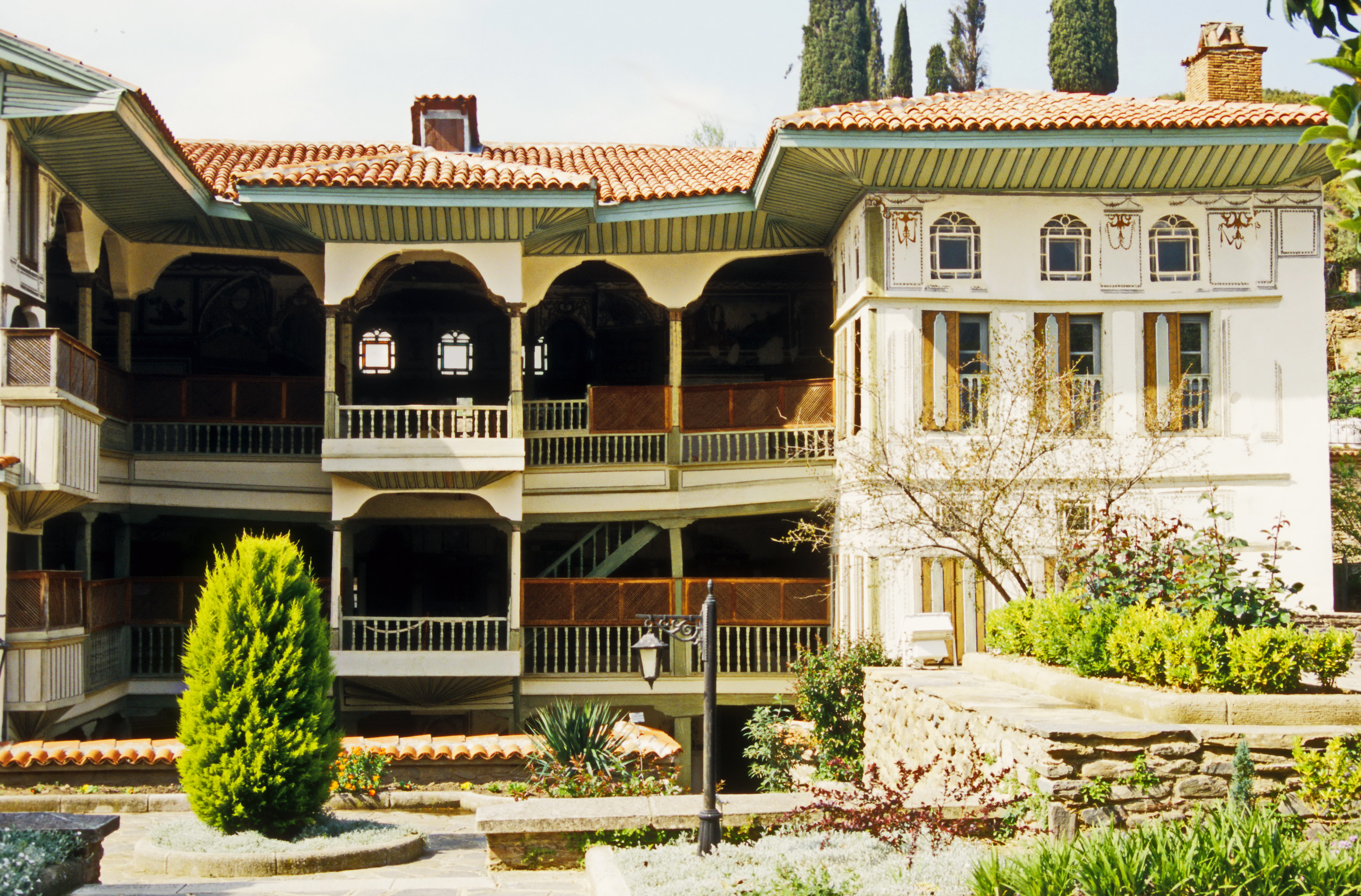
Exterior of the Çakırağa Konak in Birgi (late 18th or early 19th century)

A few konak mansions have survived from the 18th century in various Anatolian towns. Of these, the largest and most elaborate is the Çakırağa Konak in Birgi, dating from the late 18th or early 19th century. By the early 18th century, the seaside mansions known as yalıs also began to proliferate along the Bosphorus shores. The oldest surviving example of these and one of the oldest surviving private mansions in Istanbul is the yalı of Amcazade Hüseyin Pasha, dating to 1695. These mansions followed the same floor plan as other urban mansions with a central main hall.

In the 19th century, floor plans became more diverse and began to include a larger number of rooms. European influence and other social changes likely also encouraged the use of more centralized and symmetrical floor plans. Historic Safranbolu is one of the best surviving 19th-century Ottoman townscapes with traditional wooden houses. Other examples of 19th-century wooden houses can be found in Anatolian towns including Amasya, Kütahya, and in the Muradiye district of Bursa, as well as in the Bulgarian city of Plovdiv.

== Gardens ==
Ottoman gardens were relatively informal and tended to accommodate natural topography, unlike gardens in many other parts of the Islamic world – such as Iran or South Asia – where a more formal design was preferred with a symmetrical four-part division or other geometric layout. Gardens could be planted with large trees for shade, smaller citrus trees, and flowerbeds. Tulips were favored for flowers, even more so in the Tulip Period during the reign of Sultan Ahmed III (r. 1703–1730).

=== Palaces and leisure gardens ===
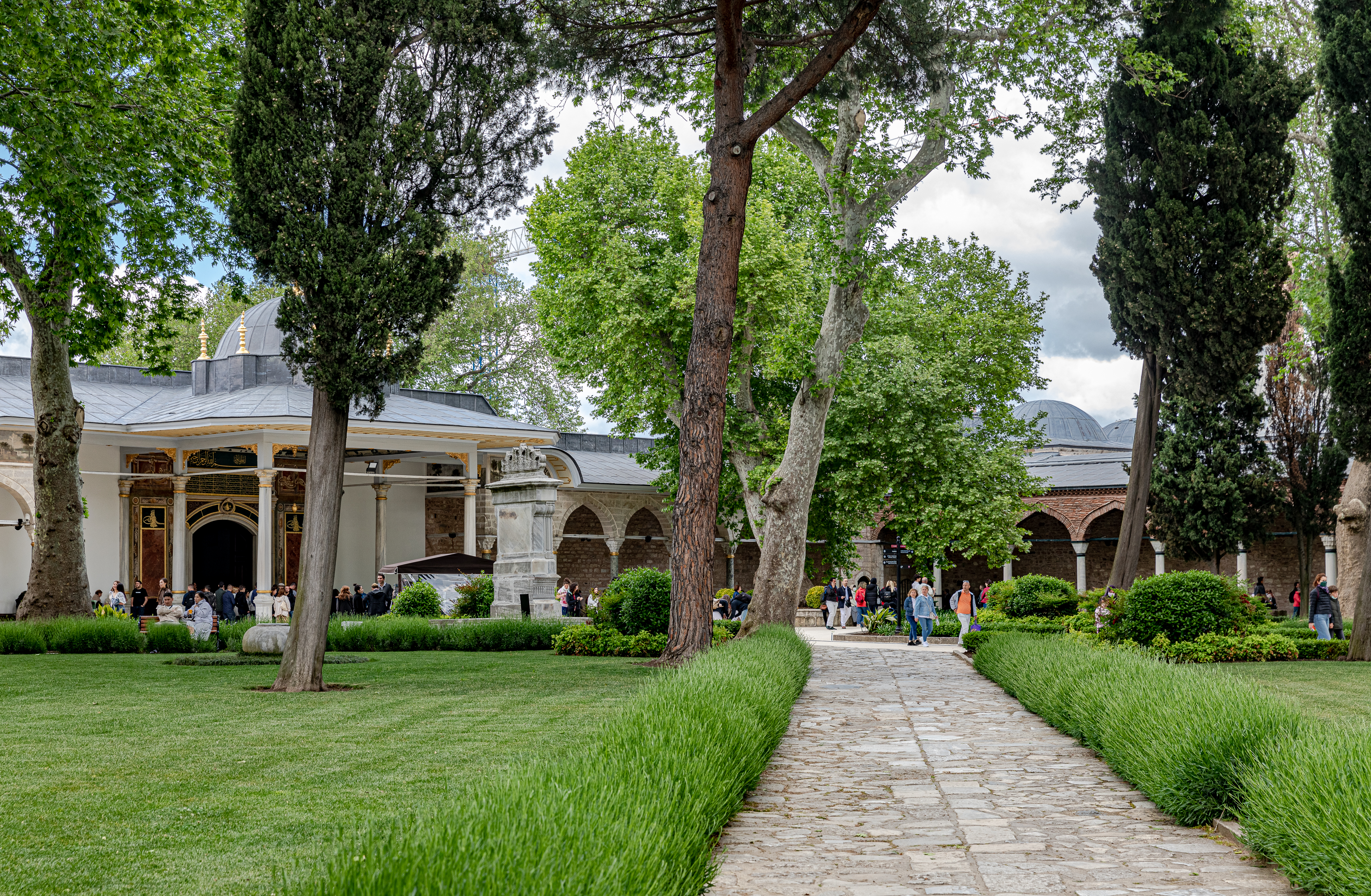
Park area with trees in the Second Court of the Topkapı Palace in Istanbul, Turkey

Exemplifying this Ottoman trend, the gardens in Topkapı Palace were laid out according to the existing topography and emphasized naturalism over geometry. Some were organized as formal gardens whereas others took the appearance of semi-natural parks, with some sections consisting of formal parterres that were then placed inside larger informal garden areas. Sultan Suleiman was a lover of gardens and employed some 2,500 gardeners to tend to roses, cypresses, and other flowering plants in the palace grounds. Ahmed III had a tulip garden planted in the Fourth Court of the palace, just outside the Circumcision Room.

One documented exception to the general trend of informal design was the Karabali Garden, laid out in the early 16th century in Kabataş (a district of Istanbul). It had four symmetrical quadrants divided by axial paths, making it an uncommon example of the chahar bagh-type garden in an Ottoman context.

Garden pavilions were a common feature of palaces and private gardens, designed to provide shelter for residents and visitors as they enjoyed views of the gardens. They are depicted in many Ottoman miniature paintings. They were often simple open kiosks with arches or columns supporting a sloped roof, but there were also more monumental tower-pavilions such as the Tower of Justice in Topkapı Palace or the Cihannüma in the Edirne Palace.

Ottoman sultans and elites built many other palaces, leisure kiosks, and estates, especially along the shores of the Bosphorus and the Sea of Marmara around Istanbul. An illustration of the Bosphorus from 1738–1739 shows many walled gardens lining both of its shores. These waterside palaces often had one side overlooking the water and the other side overlooking gardens. The Topkapı-style tradition of a sprawling palace with multiple pavilions amidst gardens made a comeback in the late 19th century when Sultan Abdulhamid II (r. 1876–1909) moved his residence to the new Yıldız Palace, which is set inside a large park area on the slopes overlooking the Bosphorus.

=== Mosques and cemeteries ===
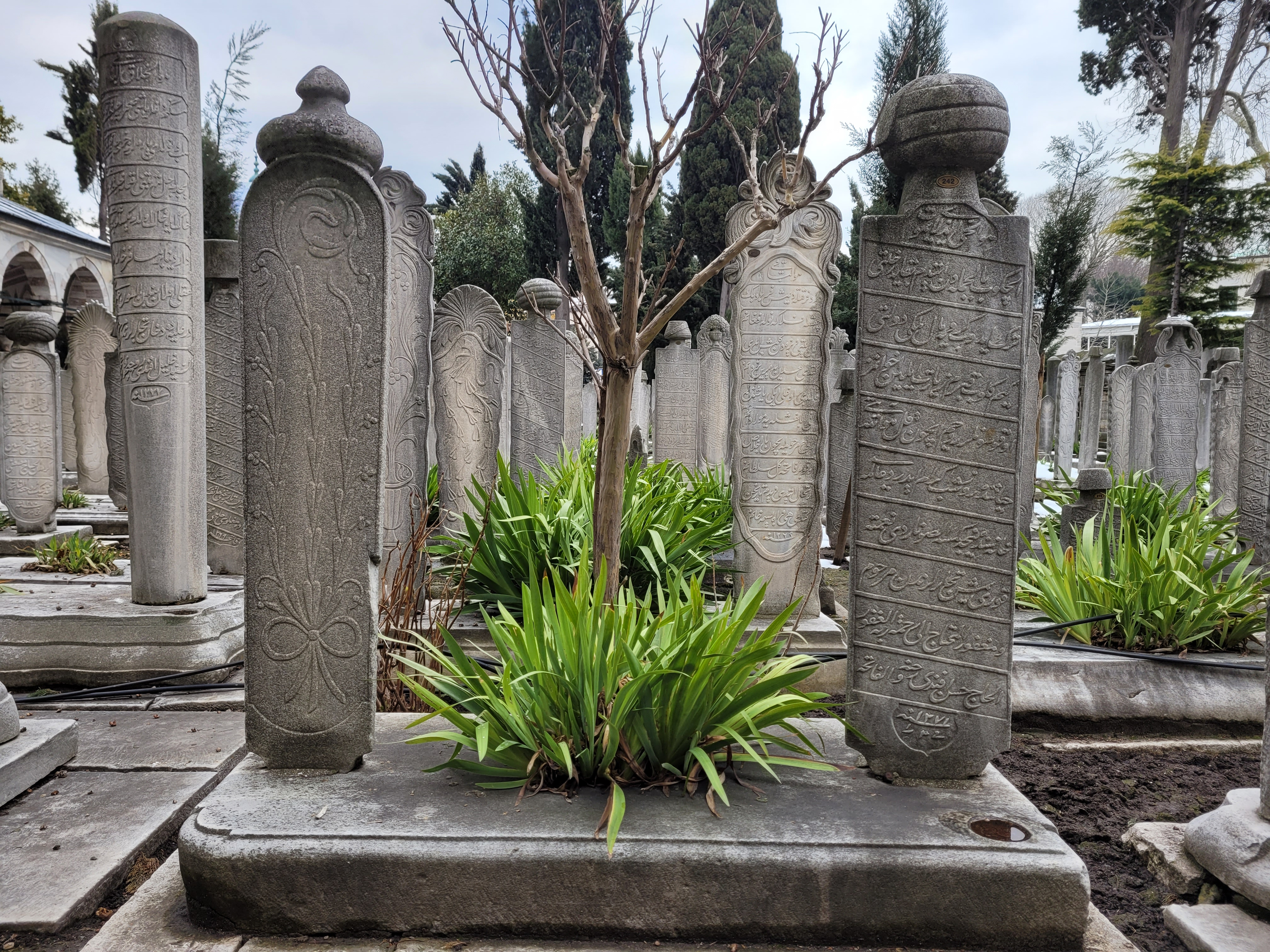
Cemetery behind the Süleymaniye Mosque in Istanbul. Ottoman cemeteries were also gardens and were often established next to mosques.

Large Ottoman küllliye complexes, which consisted of a mosque with other charitable and religious buildings around it, were often set inside an outer enclosure. The grounds and common spaces of these enclosures were planted with grass and trees, around which the various structures were organized.

Some Ottoman mosques in Istanbul also had trees planted inside their courtyards. At the Fatih Mosque, the courtyard once contained four cypress trees planted around a central fountain, a composition likely originating from the now-vanished atrium of the Hagia Sophia, which featured the same arrangement. A late 18th-century illustration of the Süleymaniye Mosque also indicates the presence of trees in its courtyard. According to Godfrey Goodwin, the first mosque to have a courtyard filled with a garden may be either the Mesih Mehmed Pasha Mosque or the Nışançı Mehmed Pasha Mosque, both built in the same neighborhood around 1585.

In Ottoman society, cemeteries and places of burial were usually gardens. Cypress trees were a common presence in this context as well. Many Ottoman mosques were accompanied by garden-cemeteries. At the Fatih and Süleymaniye mosques, these garden-cemeteries are set behind the qibla wall of the mosque and contain the mausoleum of the sultan who founded the mosque, along with other burials. The cemeteries were planted with trees and flowers but the graves themselves may have also been imagined as miniature gardens, since they contain small plots laid out for planting and some of the tombstones even have holes to anchor vines.

== Architecture in the provinces ==
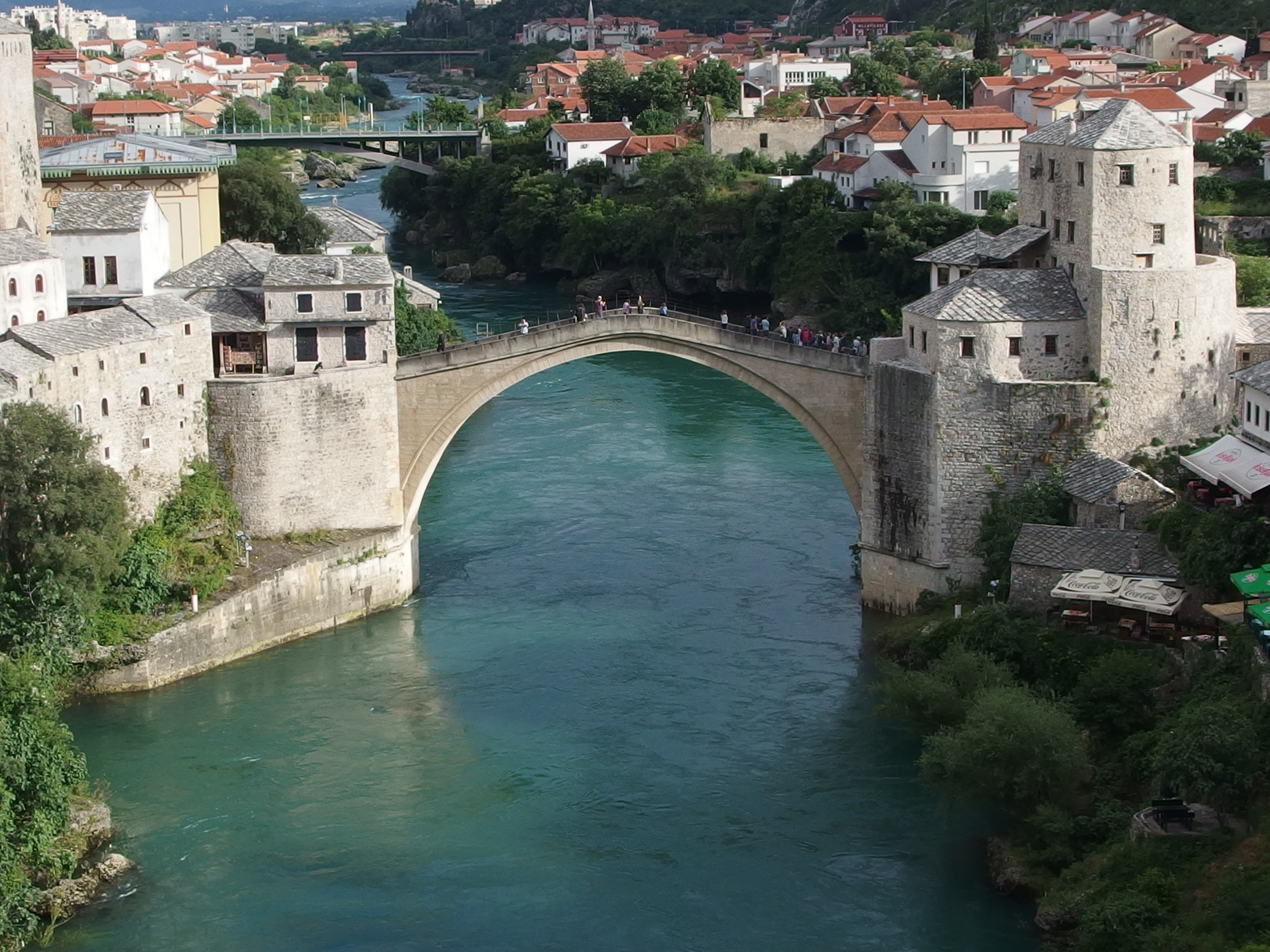
Stari Most (Old Bridge) in Mostar (1557–1566) is one of the most celebrated Ottoman monuments in the Balkans.

The main developments in Ottoman architecture generally took place in the capital cities (Bursa, Edirne, Istanbul) and other major administrative centers that were closely associated with the Ottoman dynasty, where imperial patronage was most concentrated. Beyond these imperial centers, Ottoman provincial governors and other local elites sponsored their own constructions, but the architectural style of these buildings varied depending on local context.

In Europe (Rumelia) and in western Anatolia, Ottoman constructions mostly imitated the trends of the capital, though there were still local variations and eccentricities. In the Balkans, the reign of Murad II (r. 1421–1451 with brief interruption) saw many renovations of early Ottoman buildings and also the construction of multiple new mosques and civic or religious complexes. Nearly all the other important Ottoman monuments in the European provinces beyond Istanbul and Edirne date from the 16th and 17th centuries. Building activity was particularly intense in the 16th century, even surpassing that of Anatolia, but it declined over the course of the 17th century. Sarajevo, Mostar, Skopje, Plovdiv and Thessaloniki were among the most important cities in the region and their Ottoman monuments often reflect a classical style. As in many other provincial areas of the empire, mosques in the Balkans generally consisted of the single-dome type with one minaret, though some were also built with sloped wooden roofs instead.

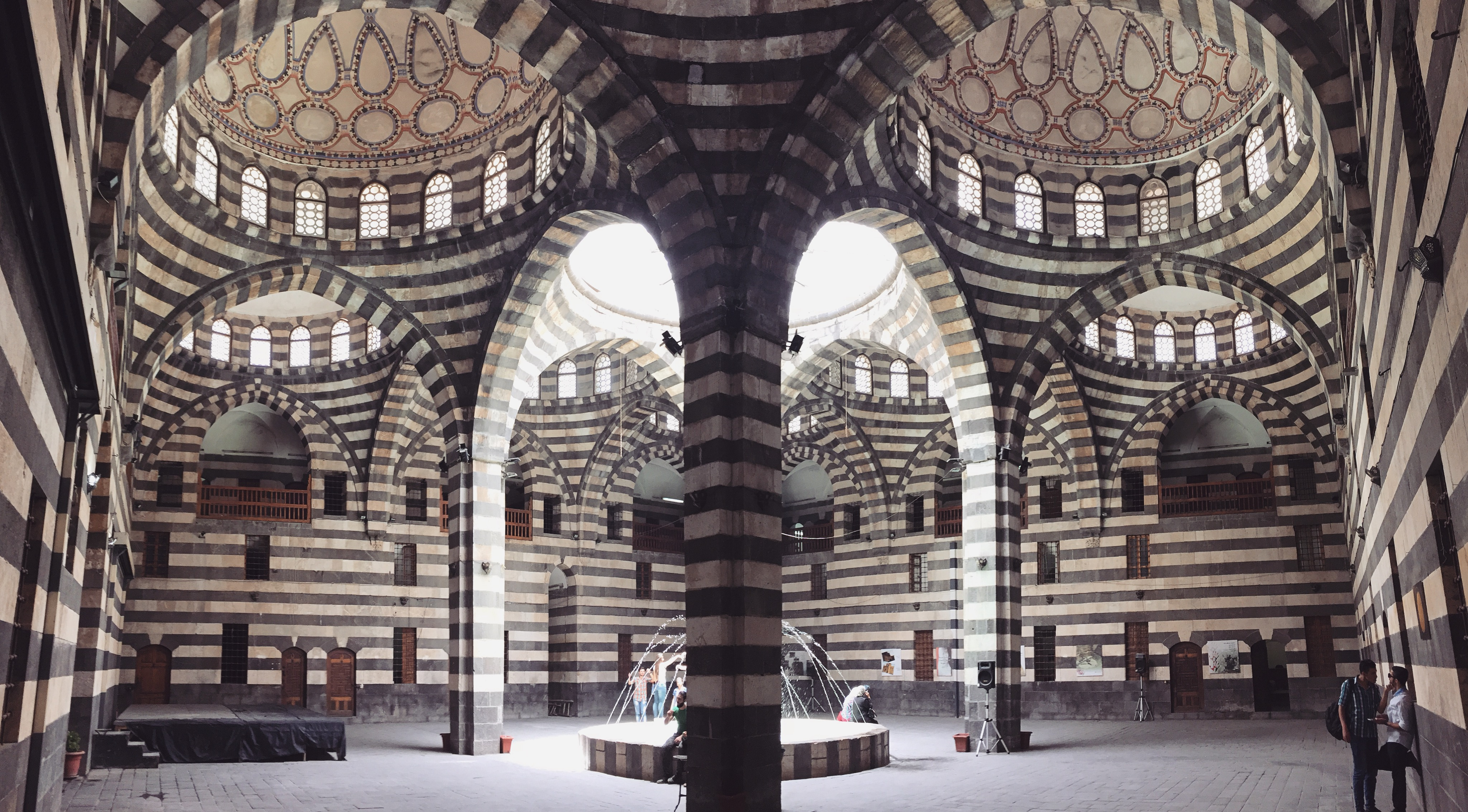
The Khan As'ad Pasha in Damascus (1753) is an example of the Ottoman penchant for domed units being integrated into local Syrian building styles.

In other regions which had been Islamized long before the Ottomans, local Islamic architectural traditions were not easily displaced and remained highly relevant in the construction of new buildings. In Egypt and the Syrian region, the Mamluk architectural style that existed before the Ottoman conquest of 1516–1517 was largely continued while incorporating elements and ideas of Ottoman architecture to varying degrees. The regions along the edges of Anatolia, Syria, and Mesopotamia (around southeastern Turkey today) also resisted assimilation to the culture of the Ottoman capital and continued to be strongly influenced by local styles. For example, Diyarbakir, Van, and Adana were important regional centers that retained or developed their own local architectural styles. Further afield in North Africa, particularly in Ottoman Algeria and Ottoman Tunisia, which were autonomous for much of the Ottoman era, the local western Islamic style was blended with Ottoman architecture in different ways. In Baghdad, Ottoman-era mosques were built almost entirely according to local traditions.

== Neo-Ottoman architecture ==
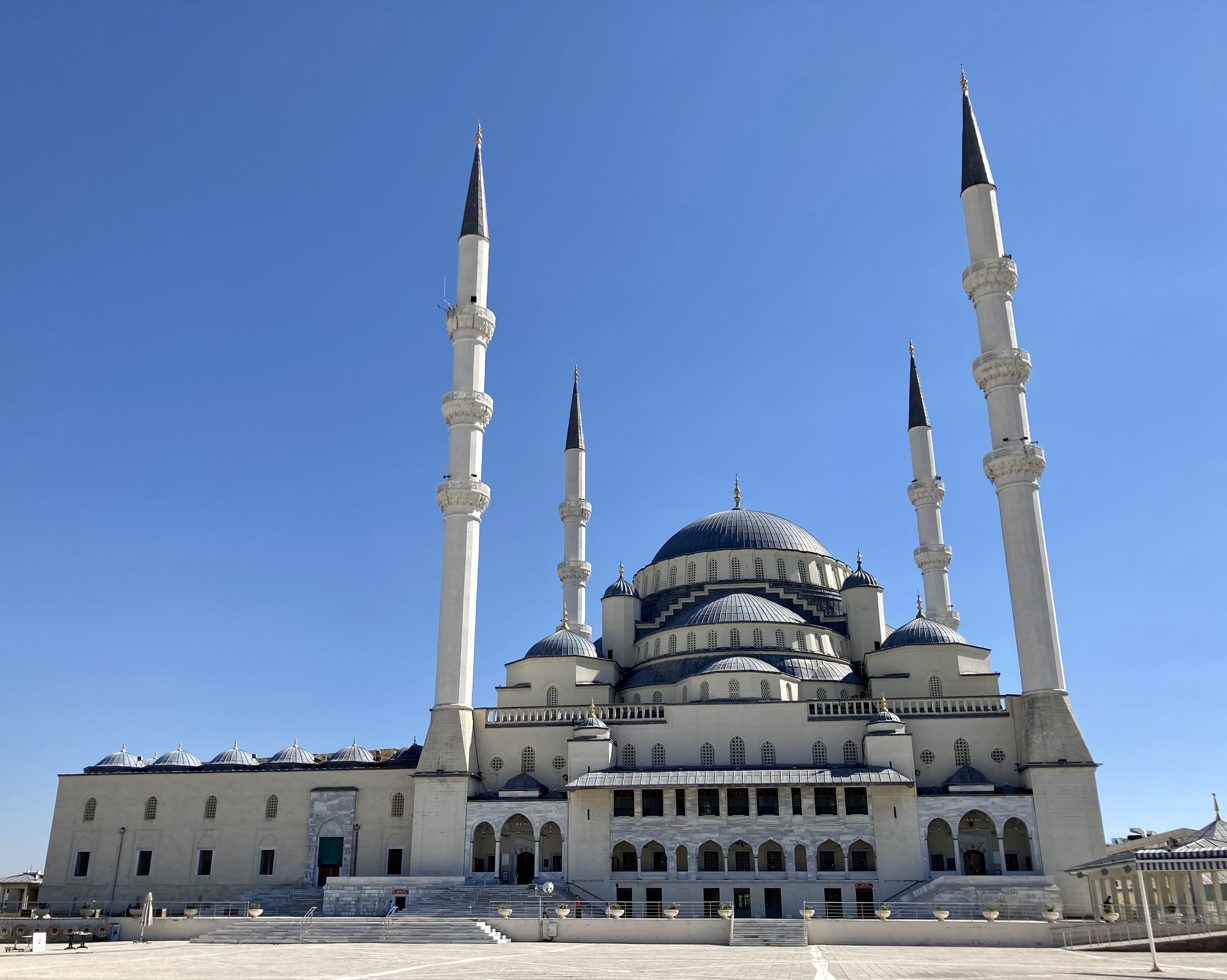
The Kocatepe Mosque in Ankara (completed in 1987) is a modern imitation of classical Ottoman mosque design.

After the dissolution of the Ottoman Empire in the early 20th century and the creation of the modern Republic of Turkey, the construction of new mosques in Turkey ceased to be a major public endeavour for many years. When new mosques were constructed, their design remained conservative and followed traditional Ottoman or local architectural models. After World War II, the Democrat Party of Turkey showed more interest in the public role of Islam. In 1957, it initiated the construction of the Kocatepe Mosque, a major new mosque in the capital, Ankara, and chose a modernist architectural design with Ottoman inspirations. After the military coup of 1960, this project was canceled and the uncompleted modernist building, which was opposed by conservative voices, was demolished in 1966. The project was re-launched the following year but the new design, by architects Hüsrev Tayla and Fatin Uluengin, was a large-scale imitation of the classical Ottoman Şehzade Mosque. After this, the design of new mosques in Turkey generally continued to imitate the former Ottoman style for several decades. Another example is the Sabancı Merkez Mosque in Adana, inspired by the works of classical Ottoman architect Sinan. Built from 1988 to 1998, it is one of the largest mosques in the region.

Neo-Ottoman mosques were also built abroad in projects that were linked to the Turkish government, such as the Ertuğrul Gazi Mosque (completed in 1998) in Ashgabat, Turkmenistan, the Tokyo Mosque (2000) in Japan, and the Şehitlik Mosque (2005) in Berlin, Germany. These were all designed by Hilmi Şenalp, whose architectural firm has specialized in neo-Ottoman designs. Another mosque of neo-Ottoman inspiration outside Turkey is the Mohammad al-Amin Mosque in Beirut, Lebanon, sponsored by the Lebanese politician Rafiq Hariri and officially inaugurated in 2008.

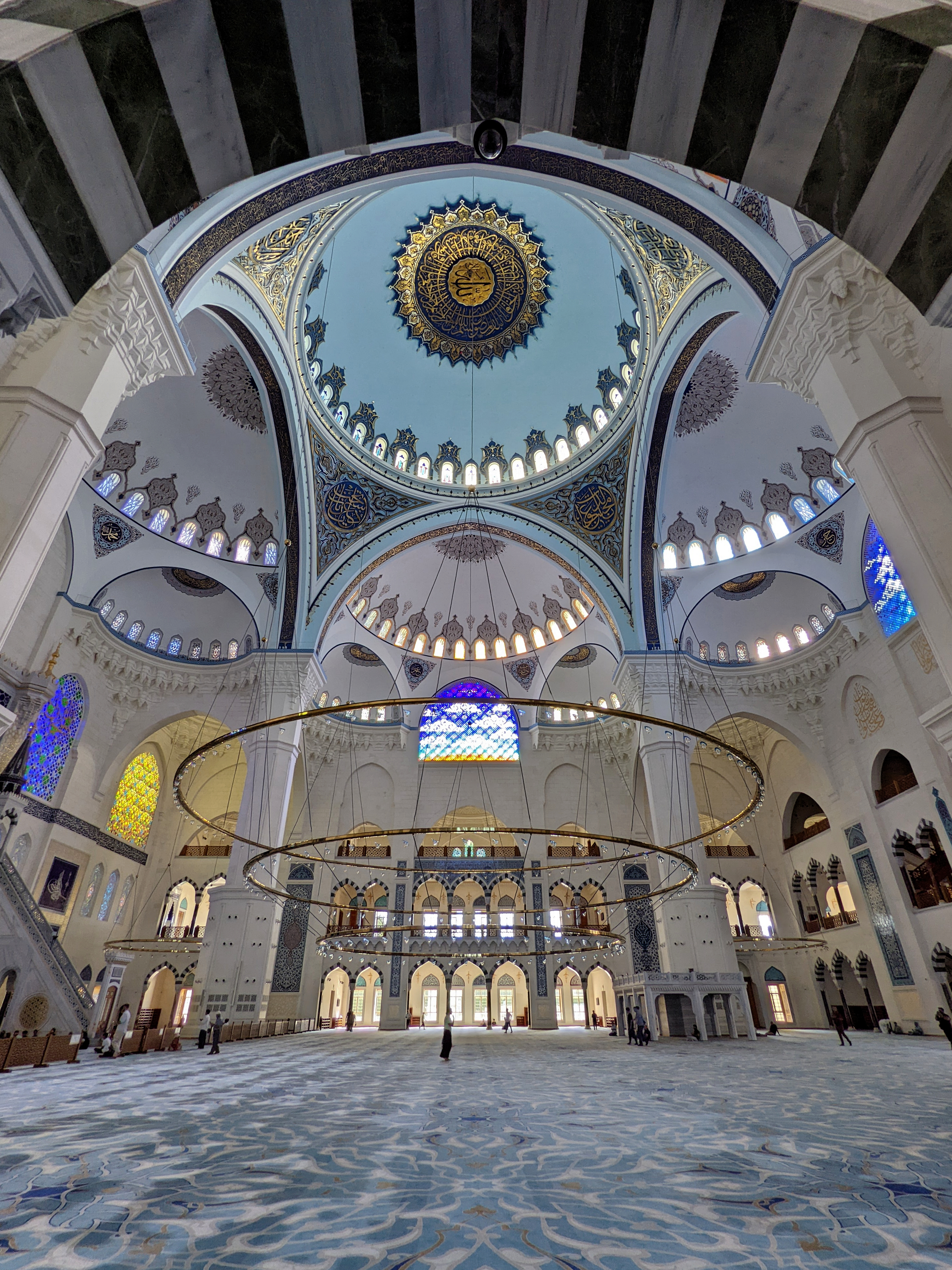
Interior of the Çamlıca Mosque (2019) in Üsküdar, a recent neo-Ottoman mosque

After the rise to power of the AKP in Turkey at the beginning of the 21st century, some more experimental modernist designs attempted to innovate on the old Ottoman model, such as the Şakirin Mosque (completed in 2009) and the Ahmet Hamdi Akseki Mosque (opened in 2013). Ultimately, the AKP favoured stricter neo-Ottoman designs as an expression of modern Turkish Islamism and as a link to the Ottoman imperial past. The first grand neo-Ottoman mosque built under the AKP government was the Mimar Sinan Mosque in the Ataşehir district of Istanbul, designed again by Hilmi Şenalp and built between 2010 and 2012. Another mosque in Adana, the Ramazanoğlu Mosque built between 2006 and 2014, also employed a neo-Ottoman design, this time by four female architects. In 2012, construction began on the neo-Ottoman Çamlıca Mosque in the Üsküdar district of Istanbul. It was officially sponsored by Turkish president Recep Tayyip Erdoğan, who pushed for the Ottoman-style design. Upon its completion in 2019, it was the largest mosque in Turkey and, like major Ottoman imperial mosques before it, it sits atop a hill to dominate the nearby skyline.

== See also ==
- List of mosques commissioned by the Ottoman dynasty
- List of Ottoman palaces in Istanbul
- Clock towers in Turkey
- Ottoman tents
