= Asakusa (disambiguation) =

Asakusa (浅草) is a district in Tokyo, Japan.

Asakusa may also refer to:

- Asakusa Station
- Asakusa International Theater in Asakusa, Tokyo
- Asakusa Mosque in central Tokyo
- Asakusa Shrine in Asakusa, Tokyo
- Toei Asakusa Line, a subway line in Tokyo
- The Scarlet Gang of Asakusa, a novel by Yasunari Kawabata
