= Atsushi Kobayashi (disambiguation) =

Atsushi Kobayashi is a Japanese retired baseball player. Others with the same name include:

- Atsushi Kobayashi, director of Just Because! and other anime
- Atsushi Kobayashi (volleyball) (born 1974), Japanese volleyball player - see 2003 FIVB Volleyball Men's World Cup squads
- Atsushi Kobayashi, 21st century mixed martial arts competitor - see 2008 in Shooto
- Atsushi Kobayashi, translator of the Quran into Japanese - see Ahmadiyya in Japan
- Atsushi Kobayashi, a character in Space Battleship Yamato: Resurrection, a 2009 Japanese animated film
