= Fukuoka Mosque =

Mosque in Fukuoka, Japan

- 福岡マスジド
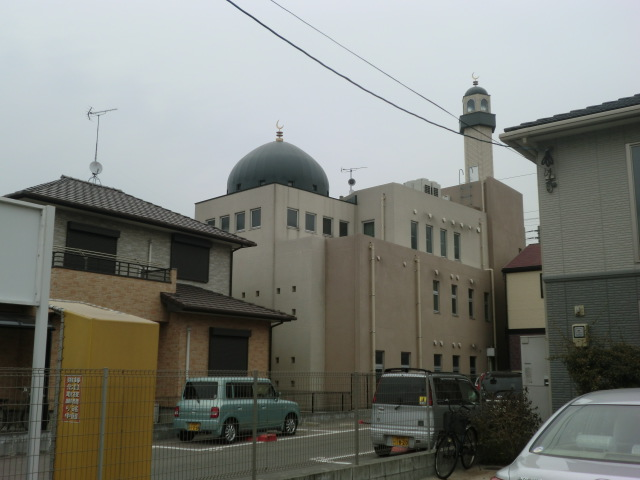

- Location within Fukuoka Prefecture

Religion
- Affiliation: Sunni Islam
- Ecclesiastical or organisational status: Mosque

Location
- Location: Higashi-ku, Fukuoka, Fukuoka Prefecture
- Country: Japan
- Interactive map of Fukuoka Mosque
- Coordinates: 33°37′12″N 130°25′37″E

Specifications
- Dome: 1
- Minaret: 1

Website
- fukuokamasjid.org

The Fukuoka Mosque, officially the Fukuoka Masjid Al Nour Islamic Culture Center (Japanese: アン ヌール イスラム文化センター 福岡マスジド), is a mosque located in Hakozaki, Higashi-ku, in the city of Fukuoka, in the Fukuoka Prefecture of Japan. Opened on 12 April 2009, it was the first mosque on the island of Kyūshū. Fukuoka Mosque serves the approximately 1,000 Muslims in the prefecture.

The first floor is mainly set for the men's prayer room, the second floor is the women's prayer room. On the basement level, there is a multi-purpose hall, a library, and a kitchen. The third floor has classrooms and a kitchen..

The mosque arranges daily prayers, Friday prayers, and Eid prayers on a regular basis. It occasionally, arranges program for conversion into Islam, Muslim marriage, and funeral prayers. The cultural wing of the mosque offers weekend Arabic language lessons and cooking classes once every three months. It also arranges seminars and dialogue sessions occasionally. Due to the difficulties of obtaining halal certificates in Japan, Fukuoka Mosque has taken to issuing certifications per local scholars' fatwa. The issuance of a free certification to a local restaurant that served both halal and non-halal food was criticized by a halal certification agency due to lack of adherence to stricter standards.

== History ==
The Kyushu University Muslim Student Association (KUMSA) initiated the idea of building a mosque in 1998, and started collecting donations. In 2006, land was purchased and construction plans were developed. After a series of discussions with concerned neighbors, construction commenced in 2008 and works were completed a year later. After earthquakes in 2011 and 2016, Fukuoka Mosque was involved in relief efforts for affected communities.

== See also ==
- Islam in Japan
- List of mosques in Japan
