= Babul Islam Mosque =

Mosque in Oyama, Tochigi, Japan

- バーブ・ル・イスラーム・マスジド
- Location within Tochigi Prefecture

Religion
- Affiliation: Islam
- Branch/tradition: Sunni
- Status: Active

Location
- Location: 237-1 Hitotonoya, Oyama, Tochigi Prefecture
- Country: Japan
- Interactive map of Babul Islam Mosque
- Coordinates: 36°18′17.8″N 139°47′18.0″E

Architecture
- Type: mosque
- Capacity: 800 worshippers

The Babul Islam Mosque is a mosque located in Oyama, Tochigi, Japan. Its main hall has a capacity of 600 worshippers.

Main activities include five times Salat, Salat ul Jumma, Salat ut Taraweeh, Salat ul Eid and weekly gathering for dars of Quran on Saturday. Other activities include Shahdah & Nikah arrangements, Gussul e Mayah (bathing of dead bodies), Janazah and other community works.

The mosque is situated at the intersection of Route 4 & Route 50.

== See also ==
- Islam in Japan
- List of mosques in Japan
