= Kamata Mosque =

Mosque in Ōta, Tokyo, Japan

- 蒲田モスク
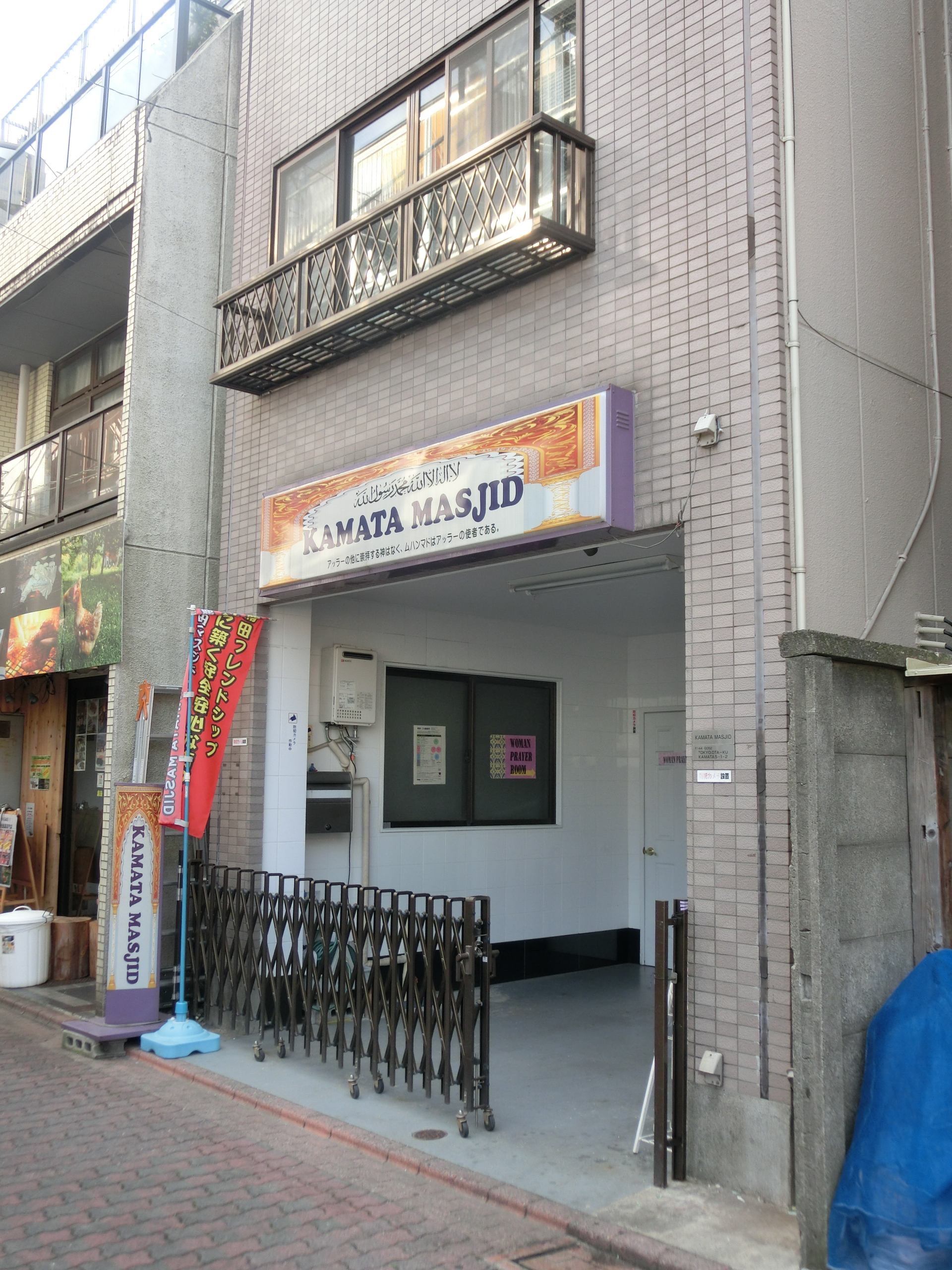
- Entrance to the mosque in 2017

- Location of the mosque in Tokyo

Religion
- Affiliation: Sunni Islam
- Ecclesiastical or organizational status: Mosque

Location
- Location: Kamata, Ōta, Tokyo
- Country: Japan
- Interactive map of Kamata Mosque
- Coordinates: 35°33′52″N 139°43′02″E

Architecture
- Established: 2001

The Kamata Mosque (Japanese: 蒲田モスク) is a mosque in Kamata District, Ōta, Tokyo, Japan.

== Overview ==
The mosque was established in 2001 and is situated in a 3-story building. The mosque is accessible within walking distance north of Kamata Station of JR East.

== See also ==
- Islam in Japan
- List of mosques in Japan
