= Yokohama Mosque =

Mosque in Yokohama, Kanagawa, Japan

- 横浜モスク
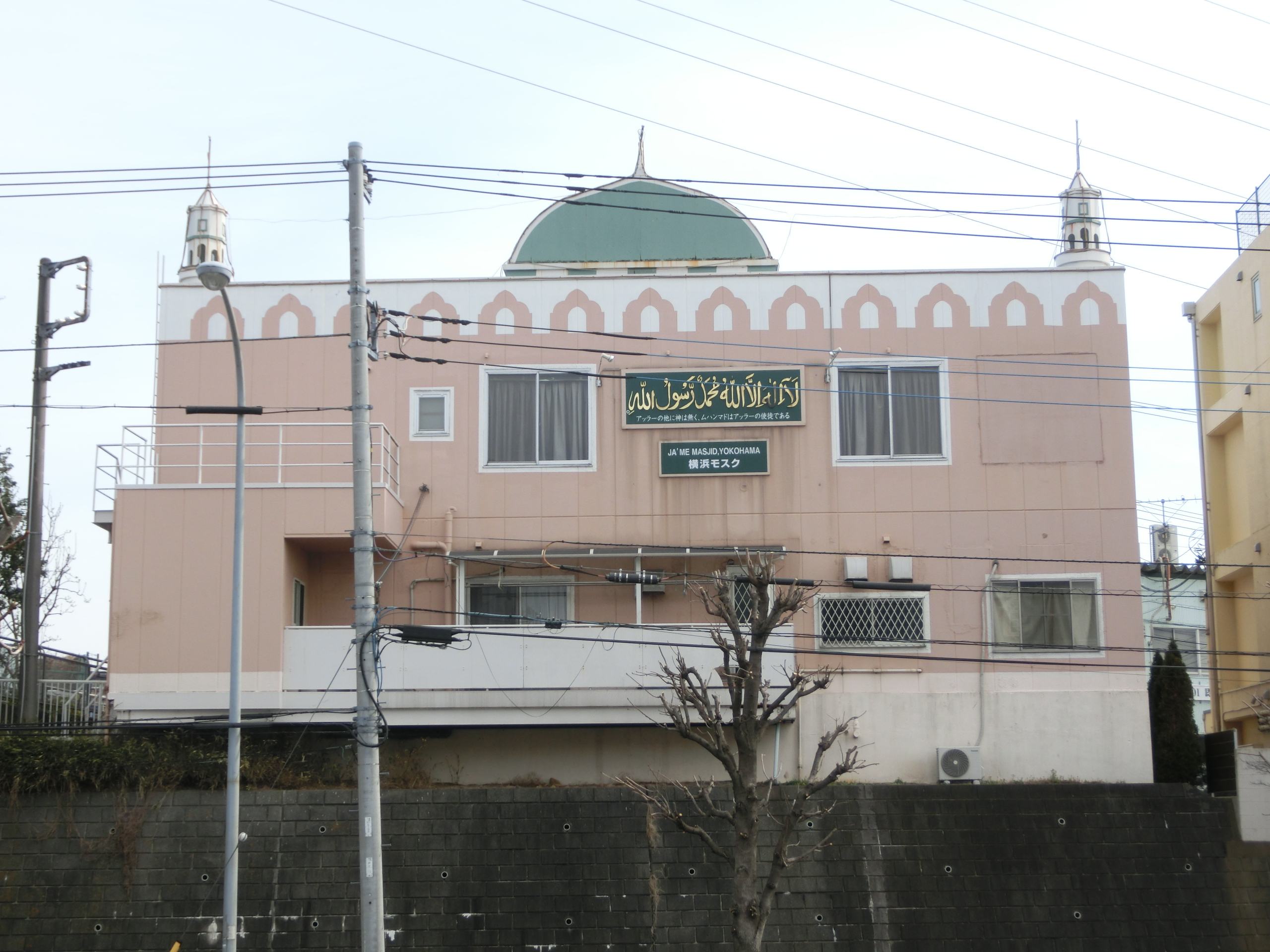

- Location within Kanagawa Prefecture

Religion
- Affiliation: Islam
- Ecclesiastical or organizational status: Mosque
- Leadership: Ramzan Hameed (Chairperson)
- Status: Active

Location
- Location: Yokohama, Kanagawa
- Country: Japan
- Interactive map of Yokohama Mosque
- Coordinates: 35°32′39″N 139°36′05″E

Architecture
- Completed: 2006
- Dome: One

Website
- masjid-yokohama.jp/index.html

The Yokohama Mosque or Ja'me Masjid, Yokohama (Japanese: 横浜モスク) is a mosque in Yokohama City, in the Kanagawa Prefecture of Japan.

== Overview ==
The mosque was established on 29 December 2006. In addition to a prayer hall, the mosque contains classrooms and a kitchen. The mosque is within walking distance south of Higashi-Yamata Station.

== See also ==
- Islam in Japan
- List of mosques in Japan
