= Gifu Mosque =

Mosque in Gifu City, Gifu Prefecture, Japan

- 岐阜モスク
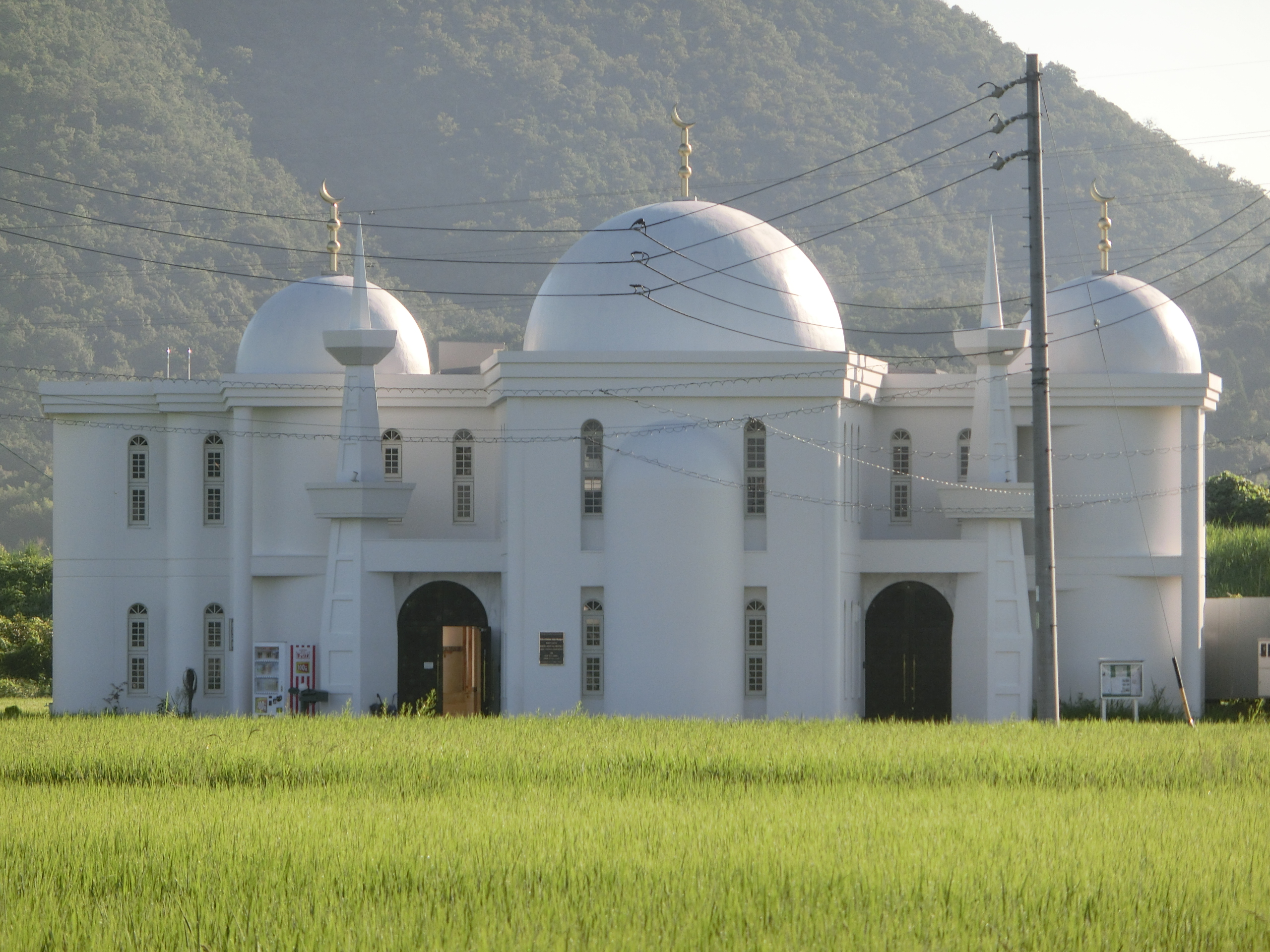

- Location within Gifu Prefecture

Religion
- Affiliation: Sunni Islam
- Ecclesiastical or organizational status: Mosque
- Status: Active

Location
- Location: Gifu City, Gifu Prefecture
- Country: Japan
- Interactive map of Gifu Mosque
- Coordinates: 35°27′30.8″N 136°44′29.9″E

Architecture
- Style: Modern Ottoman
- Groundbreaking: 2007
- Completed: 2008

Specifications
- Interior area: 351 m^{2} (3,780 sq ft)
- Dome: 3

The Gifu Mosque or Bab al-Islam Gifu Mosque (Japanese: 岐阜モスク) is a mosque in Gifu City, Gifu Prefecture, Japan. It is the first mosque in the prefecture.

== Overview ==
The mosque was established by Nagoya Mosque. The construction started on 25 October 2007 and completed on 30 June 2008 at a cost of JP¥129 million.

The 2-story mosque building was constructed in a Modern Ottoman architectural style, that has been painted white. The complex has a total area of 351 square metres (3,780 sq ft); and is located adjacent to a Muslim Culture Center and an Islamic school, that were constructed at a cost of JP¥135 million.

The mosque is accessible by bus from Gifu Station.

== See also ==
- Islam in Japan
- List of mosques in Japan
