= List of mosques in Japan =

This is a list of major mosques in Japan.

According to The Asahi Shimbun, in may 2023 there are 113 mosques in Japan.

== History ==
The first mosque was the Kobe Muslim Mosque, established in 1935. According to japanfocus.org, as of 2009 there were 30 to 40 single-story mosques in Japan, the largest of which is the Tokyo Mosque, plus another 100 or more apartment rooms set aside for prayers in the absence of more suitable facilities. 90% of these mosques use the 2nd floor for religious activities and the first floor as a halal shop (imported food; mainly from Indonesia and Malaysia), due to financial problems, as membership is too low to cover the expenses. Most of these mosques have only a capacity of 30 to 50 people. In 2016, the first ever mosque tailored for native Japanese worshipers (as opposed to services in foreign languages) was opened. In 2021, there were 113 Mosques in Japan. As of 2023, there is one Ahmadi mosque in Japan, The Japan Mosque. It was established in 2015 by Mirza Masroor Ahmad, the mosque has a capacity of 500 worshippers, the largest of any mosque in Japan.

== List ==
Name	Images	City	Year	Remarks
Asakusa Mosque		Asakusa, Taitō, Tokyo	1998	ICOJ
Edogawa Mosque		Edogawa, Tokyo		
Fukuoka Mosque		Fukuoka, Fukuoka	2009	
Gifu Mosque		Gifu, Gifu	2008	
Hira Mosque		Ichikawa, Chiba	1997	ICOJ
Meguro Mosque		Meguro, Tokyo	after 2015	Sunni mosque located in a four-storey building, funded with the support of the Indonesian Ministry of Foreign Affairs
The Japan Mosque		Tsushima, Aichi	2001	The only Ahmadiyya mosque in Japan.
Kamata Mosque		Kamata, Ōta, Tokyo	2001	
Kōbe Mosque		Kobe, Hyōgo	1935	The first mosque in Japan; completed in the Indo-Islamic style.
Mito Mosque		Mito, Ibaraki	2007	ICOJ
Nagoya Mosque		Nagoya, Aichi	1998	
Babul Islam Mosque		Oyama, Tochigi		ICOJ
Tokyo Mosque		Shibuya, Tokyo	1938	The largest mosque in Japan, the Turkish Sunni mosque was completed in the Ottoman style and remodelled in 2000.
Tatebayashi Mosque		Tatebayashi, Gunma	2004	ICOJ
Yokohama Mosque		Yokohama, Kanagawa	2006	

== See also ==
- Islam in Japan
- Lists of mosques
