= Sacred Heart Cathedral, Yokohama =

Cathedral in Yokohama, Japan

Coordinates: 35°26′11″N 139°38′50″E

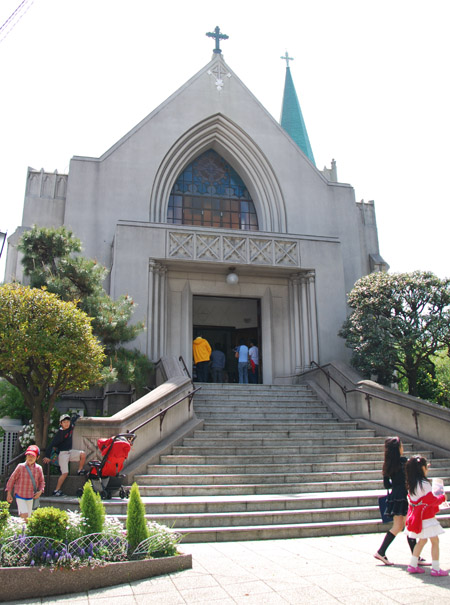
Front view

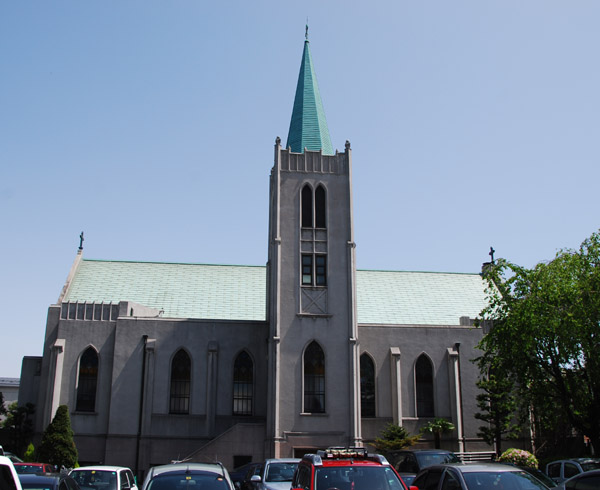
Side view

Sacred Heart Cathedral (Japanese: カトリック山手教会) is the seat of the bishop of the Roman Catholic Diocese of Yokohama, Japan. The Yokohama diocese includes Kanagawa, Shizuoka, Nagano, and Yamanashi prefectures. As it is located at 44 Yamate-cho, Naka-ku, the cathedral is commonly known locally as Yamate Catholic Church (カトリック山手教会, Katorikku Yamate Kyōkai).

Immediately after the lifting of the a long-standing ban on Christianity, a Catholic church was built in 1862 by the Paris Foreign Missions Society in the Yokohama foreign settlement (currently Yamashita-cho). This church was moved to its current location in 1906, and was a brick building with two bell towers, which was completely destroyed during the 1923 Great Kantō earthquake. The rebuilt Yamate Catholic Church was designed by Czech architect Jan Josef Švagr in the Neo-Gothic style and completed in 1933. When the Diocese of Yokohama was erected in 1937, the Yamate church became its cathedral.

== See also ==
- List of cathedrals in Japan
