= Arabs in Japan =

在日アラブ人 Zainichi Arabujin

Regions with significant populations
- Tokyo (mainly Shinjuku and Shibuya), Anjō, Chiba, Handa, Kariya, Kawasaki, Kōbe, Komaki, Kyoto, Nagoya, Ōsaka, Saitama, Sakai, Tōkai, Yokohama

Languages
- Arabic, Japanese

Religion
- Islam

Arabs in Japan consist of Arab migrants that come to Japan, as well as their descendants. In December 2016, there were 6,037 Arabs living in Japan.

== History ==
There are isolated records of contact between Arab countries and Japan before the opening of the country in 1853. Some elements of Islamic philosophy From Rashidun, Umayyad and Abbasid were also distilled as far as back as the Heian period. Early European accounts of Muslims and their contacts with Japan were maintained by Portuguese sailors who mention a passenger aboard their ship, an Arab who had preached Islam to the people of Japan. He had sailed to the islands in Malacca in 1555.

== Population ==
Number of Arabs in Japan by nationality
Nation	Population
Egypt	2,273 (2023)
Syria	1,091 (2022)
Tunisia	733 (2023)
Morocco	677 (2025)
Saudi Arabia	385 (2025)
Sudan	278 (2023)
Algeria	229 (2019)
Jordan	224 (2022)
Iraq	160 (2022)
Lebanon	157 (2022)
Yemen	133 (2022)
UAE	87 (2024)
Palestine	82 (2021)
Libya	70 (2018)
Kuwait	41 (2019)
Oman	37 (2023)
Bahrain	27 (2019)
Qatar	26 (2018)
Mauritania	24 (2019)
Somalia	14 (2018)
Djibouti	10 (2018)
Comoros	1 (2019)
Total	6,613

== Notable people ==
- Sultan Nour, politician (Syrian parents)
- Carlos Ghosn, businessman (Lebanese parents)
- Mei Shigenobu, journalist (Palestinian father)
- Ken Noguchi, mountaineer (Egyptian mother)
- Erika Sawajiri, actress (Algerian mother, raised in Japan)
- Osama el-Samni, soccer player (Egyptian father)
- Fairouz Ai, voice actress (Egyptian father, raised in Egypt and Japan)
- Elly Akira, actress (Syrian father)
