= Japan Muslim Association =

Muslim congregation in Japan

- 日本ムスリム協会
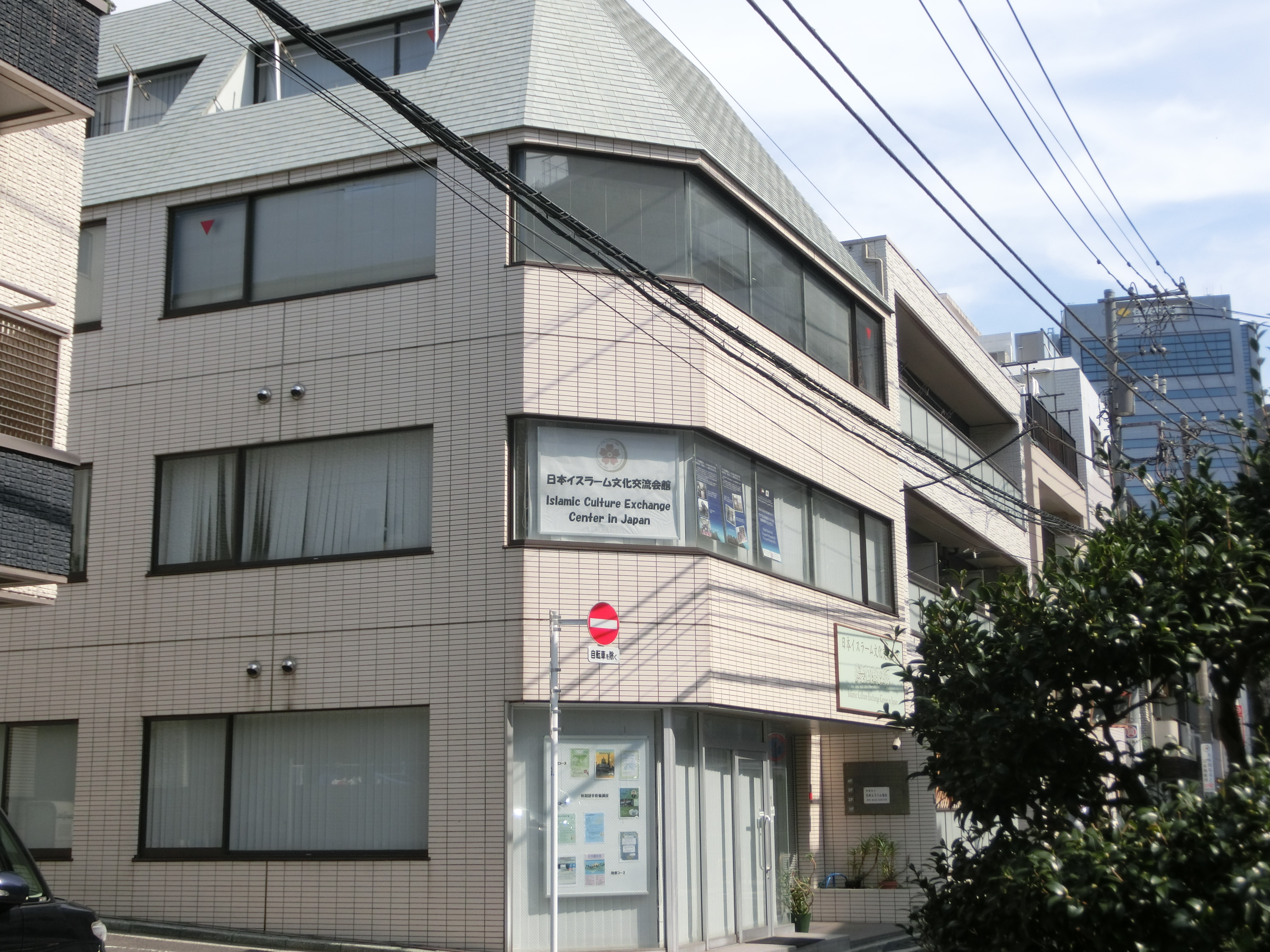
- Japan Muslim Association Headquarters
- Abbreviation: JMA
- Formation: 1952
- Founder: 47 founding members
- Type: Religious organization
- Legal status: Religious corporation
- Headquarters: Tokyo, Japan
- Region served: Japan
- Services: To promote Islamic faith and cultural understanding in Japan
- Official language: Japanese
- President: Yahya Toshio Endo
- Vice President: Saeed Sato
- Main organ: Board of Trustees
- Affiliations: Department of Islamic Development Malaysia (JAKIM); Majelis Ulama Indonesia (MUI); Islamic Religious Council of Singapore (MUIS)
- Website: www.muslim.or.jp

The Japan Muslim Association (日本ムスリム協会, nihon musurimu kyōkai) (JMA) is the first Muslim congregation in Japan. Founded in 1952 by 47 members, it was chartered as a religious corporation in June 1968. It aims to create a path for the Muslim minority to practice the doctrines of Islam while in harmony with Japanese society. Since its inception, the Association has dispatched its members to Islamic countries as exchange students, and the number has reached 60.

== History ==
The Japan Muslim Association was initially founded in 1952 when 47 Japanese Muslims and scholars who were engaged during World War II in intelligence gathering work in Asian countries formed the "Society of Islamic Friends." In 1953, it was renamed to the current "Japanese Muslim Association." Since 1957, the Association has sent Muslims to Islamic universities such as the Al-Azhar University in Egypt, and in 1959, it launched the official bulletin, the Voice of Islam. In 1968, the Association was registered as a religious corporation. The number of members during this period was about 60, according to the Voice of Islam. In 1961, the Muslim Students Association was founded with Muslim international students as its core members, and in 1963, the Association for Islamic Studies in Japan was established as an academic society.

In 2009, the Association was invited to an Iftar (dinner to end Ramadan fasting) held at the Kuwaiti Embassy in Tokyo. In 2015, the Association joined other Islamic organizations and mosques in Japan in support of the Nagoya Mosque's request to the Japanese mass media to change their use of the term Islamic State for the ISIL (Islamic State of Iraq and the Levant) to something else. In 2020, in response to the COVID-19 pandemic, the Association collaborated with more than 30 Islamic organizations and groups, such as Islamic Center Japan and Hokkaido Islamic Society, to avoid Ramadan gatherings and for Imams (Islamic leaders of prayer in mosques) to hold online classes for Muslims.

== Activity ==
=== Publishing ===
The Japan Muslim Association publishes various religious texts, such as the Qur’an and Tafsir, available upon inquiry with shipping fees.

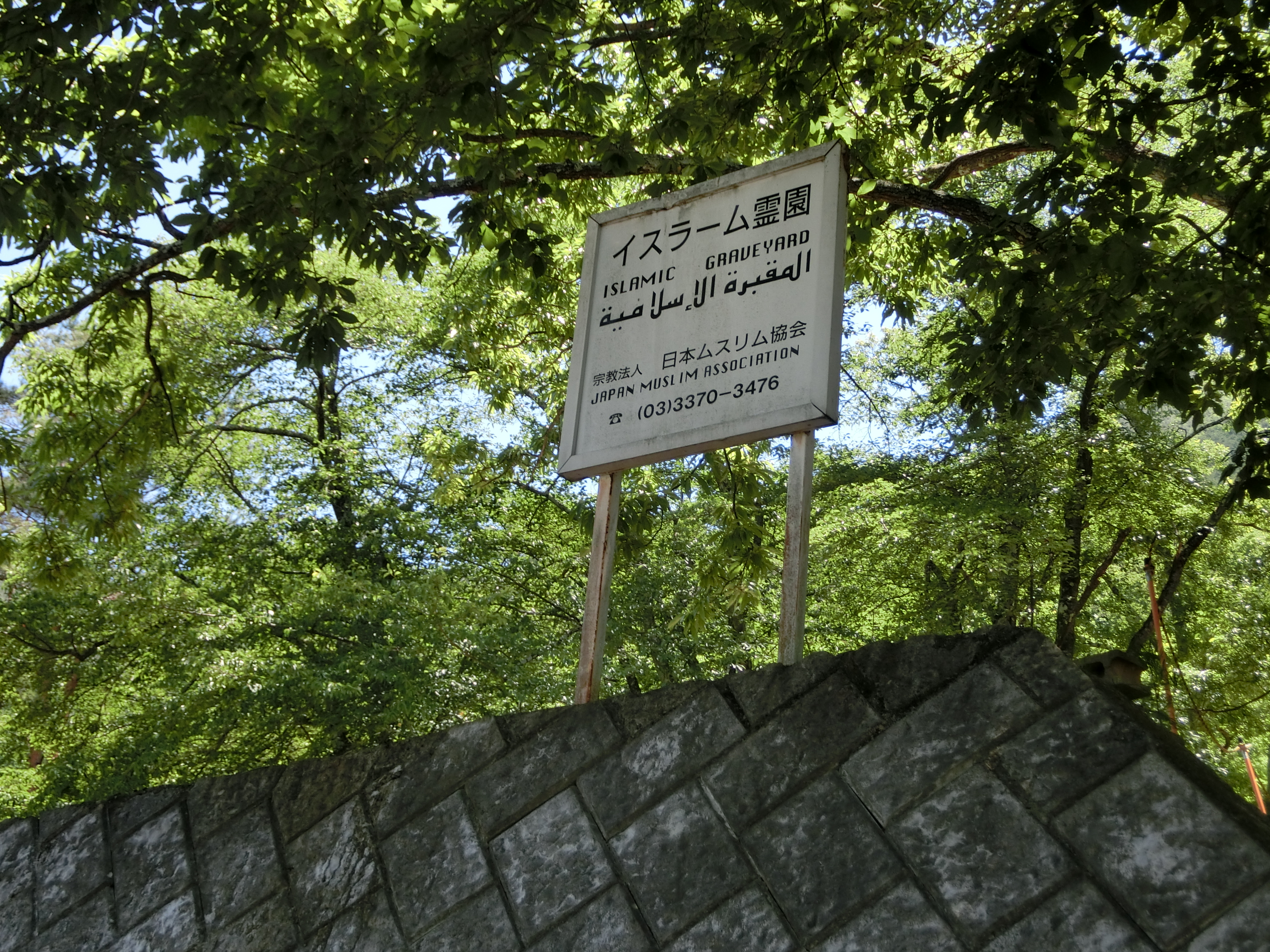
Enzan Islamic Graveyard

=== Operation of Muslim Cemeteries ===
In 1963, the Japan Muslim Association purchased the land of a Buddhist temple, Monjuin, and in 1969, with the approval of Yamanashi Prefecture, it established Japan's first Muslim cemetery in Enzan city, covering 85,400 square feet in nine sections. It has been in operation to this day. In 2000, the burial plots were expanded in response to the increase in the number of Muslims in the country. Initially, this cemetery was established as a cemetery for Muslims from all over the world, but the Association changed the name to a Cemetery for Japanese Muslims.

=== Halal Certification ===
Halal refers to sanctioned activities (e.g., promises, contracts, jobs) and objects (e.g., food, drinks, cosmetics) under Islamic law. Under it, eating pork is prohibited, and other food products must be processed and cooked by designated methods. Foods that comply with these rules are considered Halal. In Japan, halal foods were mainly sold at grocery stores for Muslims in the country, but in recent years, restaurants that provide halal food have also appeared. In addition, responding to the recent increase in the number of international students from Islamic countries, some universities (e.g., Tohoku University, Kyushu University, University of Yamanashi, and the International University of Japan) have begun to add Halal food to their student cafeteria menus. According to the National Federation of University Co-operative Associations, as of 2014, at least 19 university co-ops in Japan serve halal food.

Japan Muslim Association is accredited by the international halal certification bodies, such as the Department of Islamic Development Malaysia, Indonesia's Majelis Ulama Council Food, Drug, and Cosmetic Inspection Agency, and Cosmetics, and Islamic Religious Council of Singapore. Of these, the only domestic halal certification body in the food sector certified by the Indonesian Ulama Council is the Japan Muslim Association as of 2014. The Association also has a partnership with the Kyoto Halal Council, a local halal certification organization in Kyoto City.

== Presidents ==
The following individuals have served as president of the association:

1st	Sadiq Yoshio Imaizumi	1953–1960
2nd	Umar Ryoichi Mita	1960–1962
3rd	Abdulkareem Atsuhira Saito	1962–1971
4th	Abu Bakr Takeo Morimoto	1971–1974
5th	Abdulmunir Shoji Watanabe	1974–1977
6th	Omar Yojiro Iokibe	1977–1984
7th	Abdul Salam Jiro Arimi	1984–1986
8th	Zubeir Hakuro Suzuki	1986–1990
9th	Khalid Mimasaka Higuchi	1990–2003
10th	Amin Kimiaki Tokumasu	2003–2021
11th	Yahya Toshio Endo	2021–Present

== Also see ==
- Japan Islamic Congress
