= Nagoya Mosque =

Mosque in Nagoya, Aichi, Japan

- 名古屋モスク
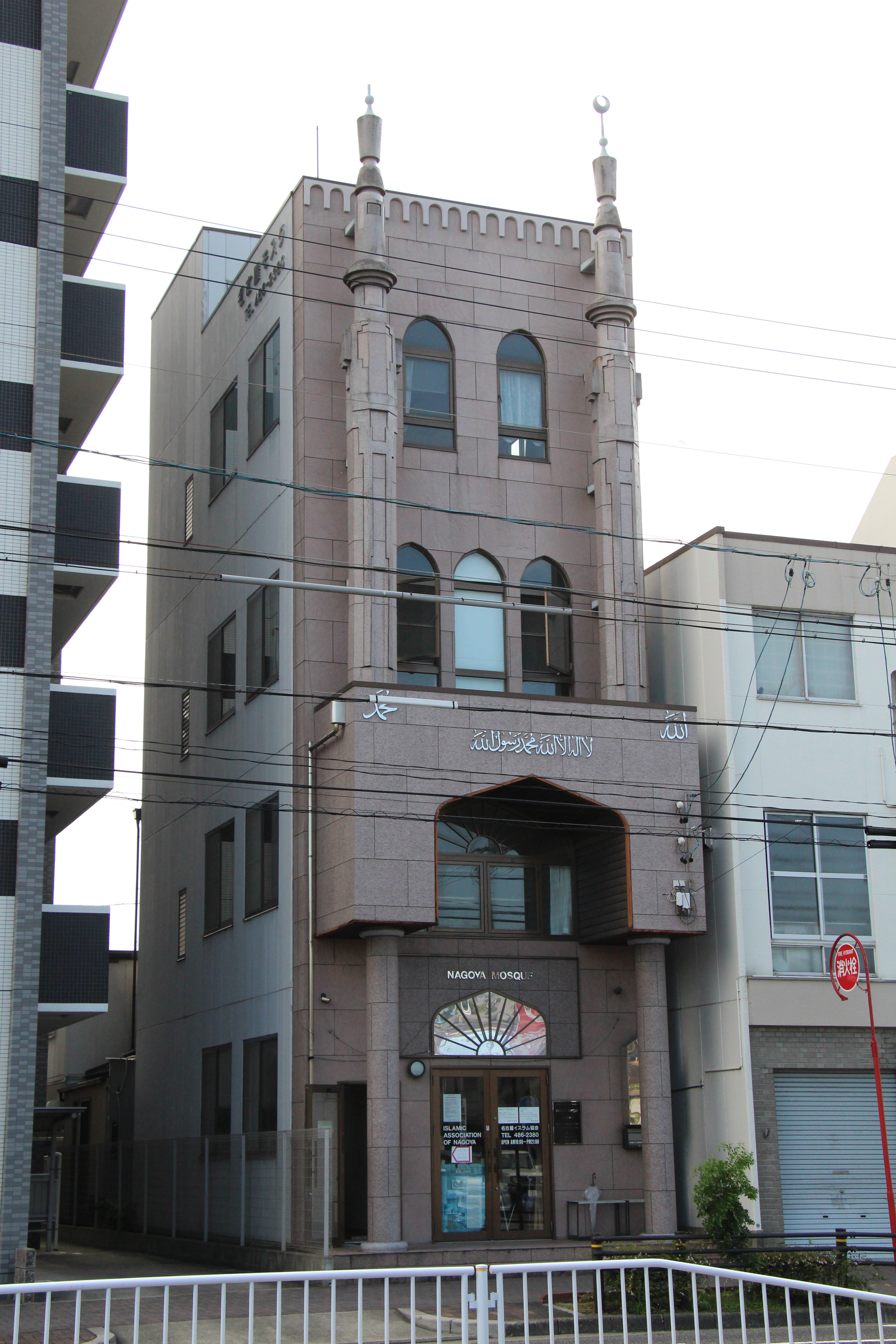

- Location within Aichi Prefecture

Religion
- Affiliation: Sunni Islam
- Ecclesiastical or organizational status: Mosque
- Status: Active

Location
- Location: 2-26-7 Honjindori, Nakamura-ku, Nagoya, Aichi
- Country: Japan
- Interactive map of Nagoya Mosque
- Coordinates: 35°10′39″N 136°52′16″E

Architecture
- Completed: 1998

The Nagoya Mosque (Japanese: 名古屋モスク, romanized: Nagoya Mosuku) is a mosque in Nakamura-ku, Nagoya, in the Aichi Prefecture of Japan.

== Overview ==
Prior to the construction of this mosque, there was a mosque called Nagoya Muslim Mosque in this area, which was burned down during World War II. In 1980s, Muslims around the area started to collect donations for construction. Eventually, the mosque was built in 1998. In 2002, they were recognized as a religious corporation in the name of Islamic Center of Nagoya, and since then, they started running the mosque. In 2008, the organization established the Gifu Masjid in Gifu Prefecture.

The organization distributes issuances and offers introductory booklets on Islam.

== See also ==
- Islam in Japan
- List of mosques in Japan
