= The Japan Mosque =

Mosque in Tsushima, Aichi, Japan

- 日本のモスク
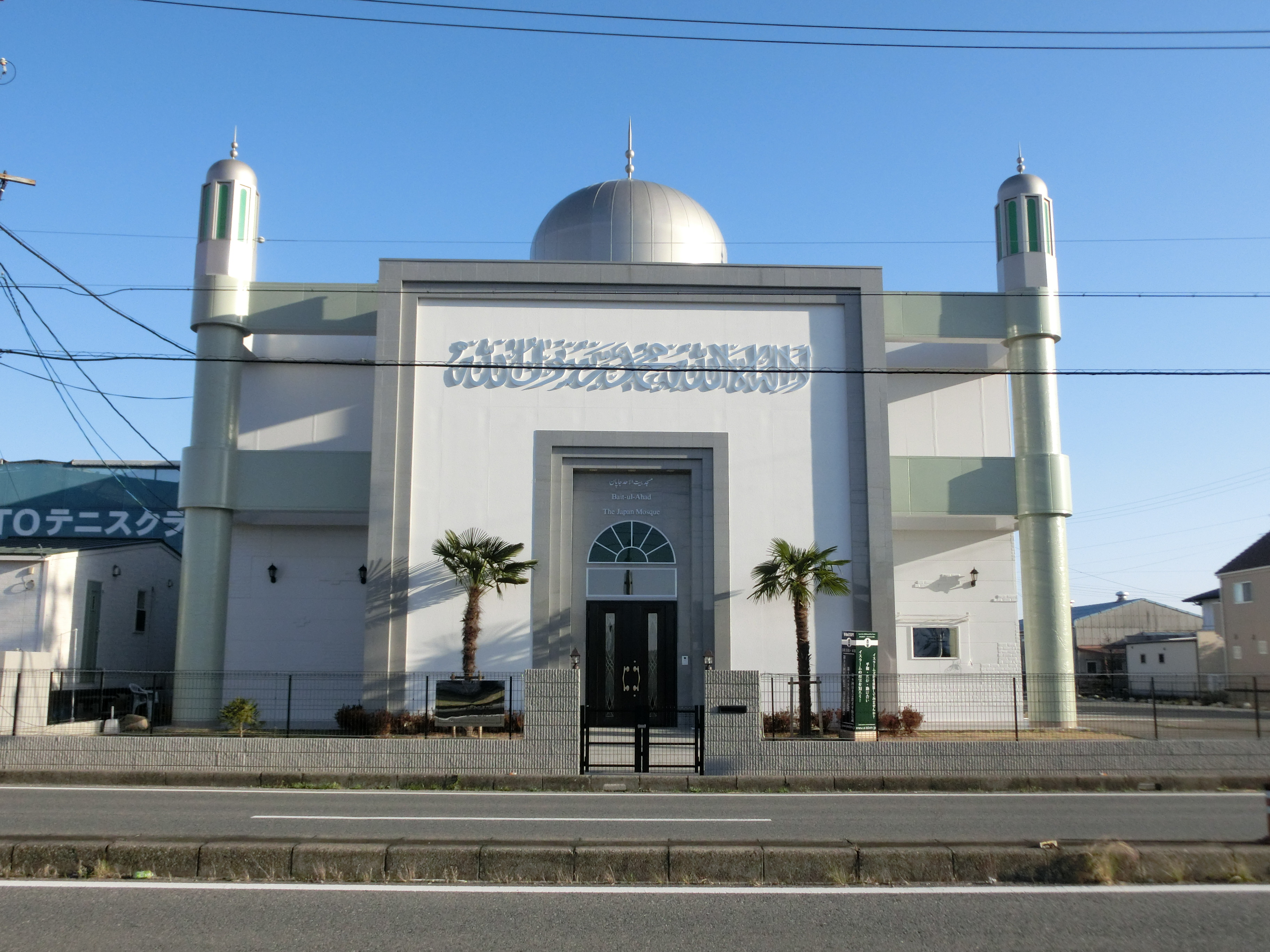

- Location of the mosque in Aichi Prefecture

Religion
- Affiliation: Ahmadiyya Islam
- Ecclesiastical or organizational status: Mosque
- Status: Active

Location
- Location: Tsushima, Aichi
- Country: Japan
- Interactive map of The Japan Mosque
- Coordinates: 35°11′10″N 136°46′22″E

Architecture
- Completed: 2015

Specifications
- Capacity: 500 worshippers
- Dome: One
- Minaret: Four

The Ahmadiyya Mosque, officially known as the Bait-ul-Ahad - The Japan Mosque (Japanese: ベイトゥルアハドモスク - 日本のモスク), is a mosque, located in Tsushima, on the outskirts of Nagoya, in the Aichi Prefecture of Japan.

Opened on 20 November 2015 by Mirza Masroor Ahmad, the fifth caliph of the Ahmadiyya Muslim Community.

== See also ==
- Ahmadiyya in Japan
- Islam in Japan
- List of mosques in Japan
