= Asakusa Mosque =

Mosque in Tokyo, Japan

- 浅草モスク
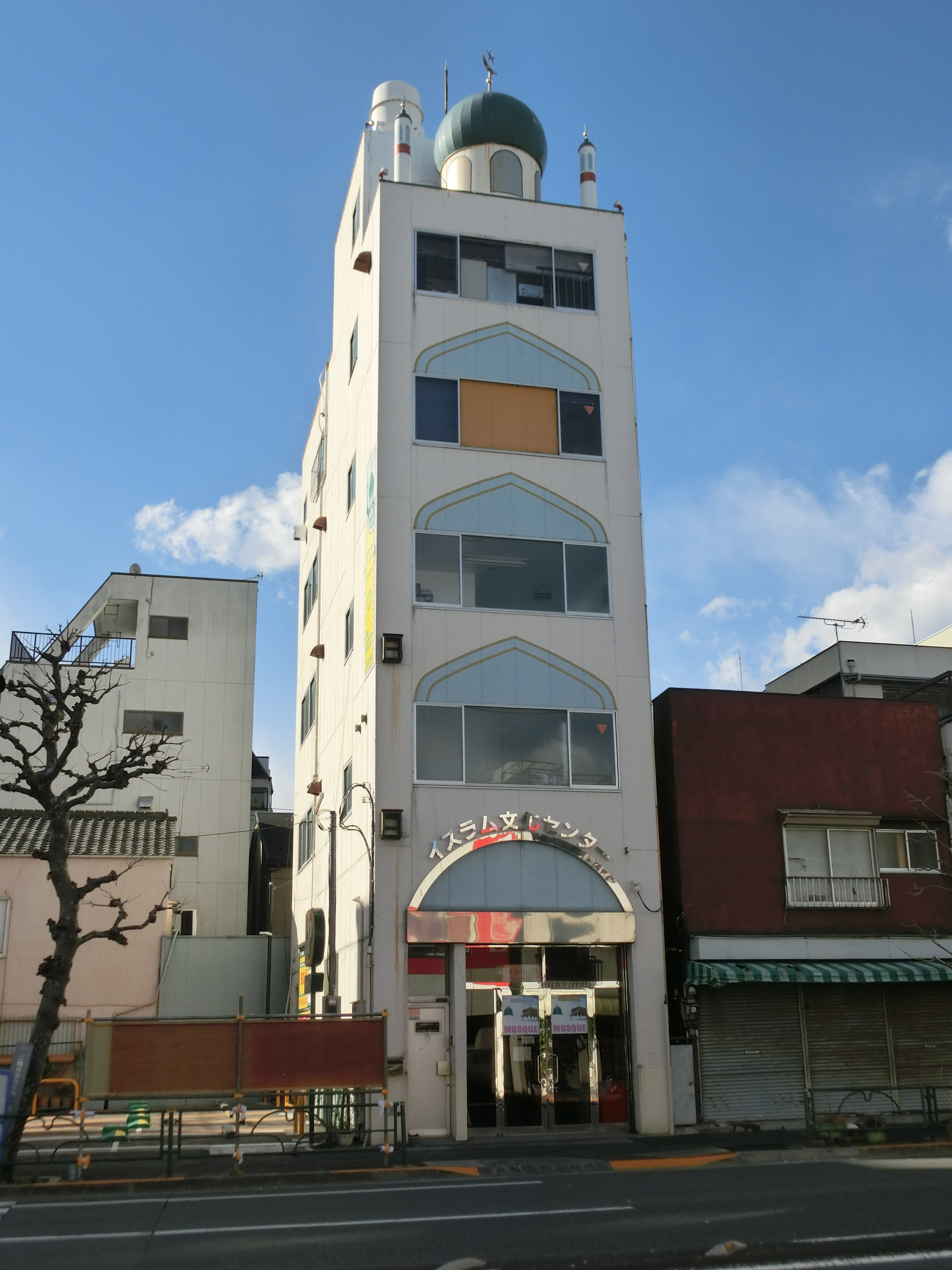
- The mosque in 2017

- Location of the mosque in Tokyo

Religion
- Affiliation: Sunni Islam
- Ecclesiastical or organizational status: Mosque
- Status: Active

Location
- Location: 1-9-12 Higashi Asakusa, Taitō, Tokyo
- Country: Japan
- Interactive map of Asakusa Mosque
- Coordinates: 35°43′18″N 139°48′05″E

Architecture
- Completed: 1998

Specifications
- Capacity: 80 worshippers
- Dome: 1

Website
- masjid-asakusa.ucoz.com/index/0-5

The Asakusa Mosque (浅草モスク (Asakusa mosuku)), officially the Daar Al-Arqam Mosque (ダール・アル・アルカム・マスジド (Dāru Aru Arukamu masujido)), and commonly known as Masjid Asakusa, is a mosque located in Asakusa, downtown Tokyo, Japan. The mosque was completed in 1998 and is managed by the Japan Mosque Foundation, a department of the Islamic Circle of Japan.

== Overview ==
The mosque provides salat and Friday prayers, and other services and classes for followers.

Located in Central Tokyo, Dar Al-Arqam Mosque is situated less than 2 kilometres (1.2 mi) from Tokyo Skytree and 500 metres (1,600 ft) from Sumida Park. It is less than 15 minutes walking from Minami Senju Metro station. Imado and Higashi Asakusa bus stations are nearby.

== See also ==
- Islam in Japan
- List of mosques in Japan
