= Petrovice (Příbram District) =

- Municipality
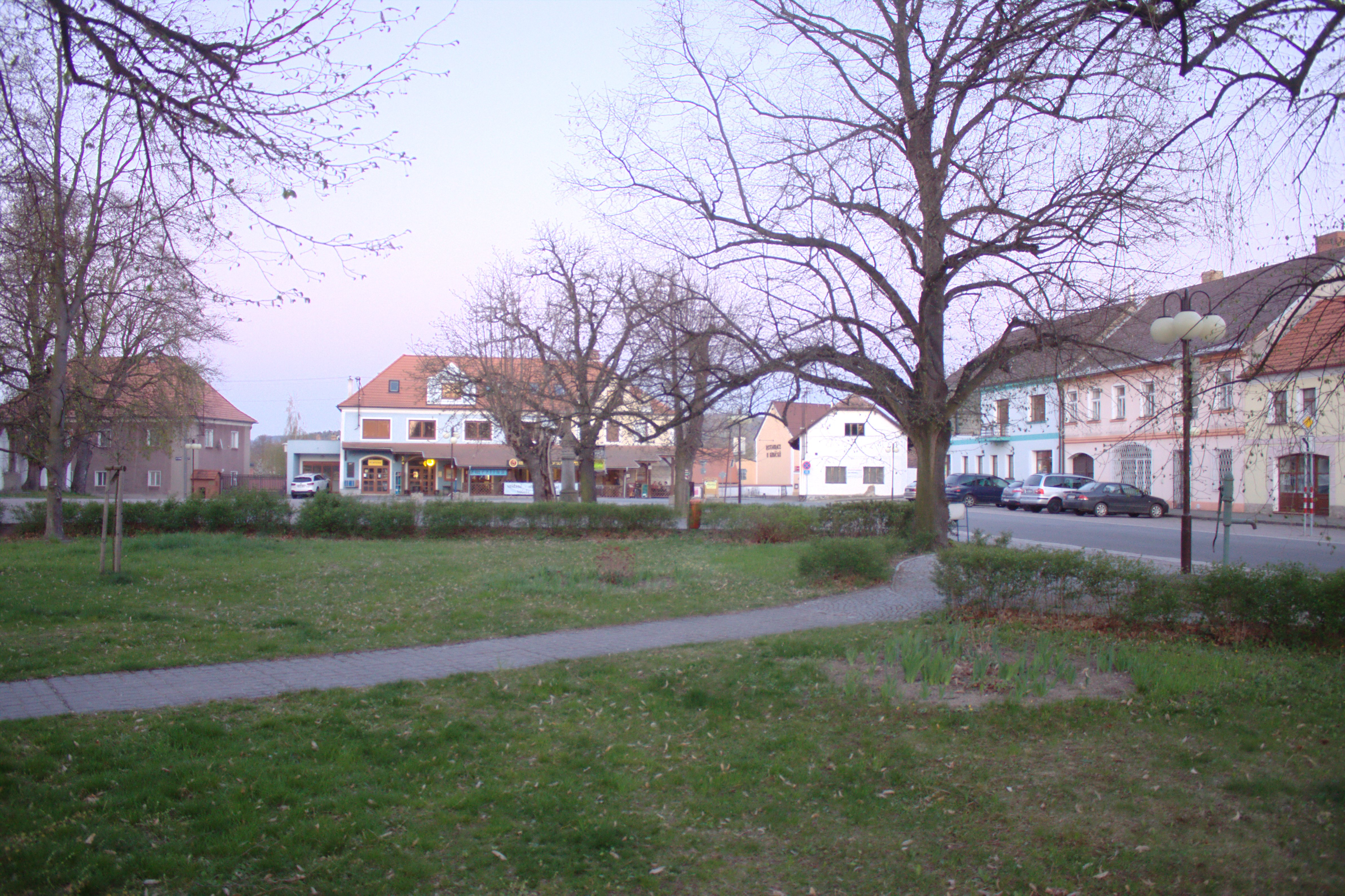
- Square in Petrovice

- Location in the Czech Republic
- Coordinates: 49°33′16″N 14°20′15″E
- Country: Czech Republic
- Region: Central Bohemian
- District: Příbram
- First mentioned: 1219

Area
  - Total: 39.02 km^{2} (15.07 sq mi)
- Elevation: 450 m (1,480 ft)

Population (2026-01-01)
  - Total: 1,334
  - Density: 34.19/km^{2} (88.55/sq mi)
- Time zone: UTC+1 (CET)
  - Summer (DST): UTC+2 (CEST)
- Postal codes: 262 91, 264 01
- Website: www.petrovice-obec.cz

Petrovice is a municipality and village in Příbram District in the Central Bohemian Region of the Czech Republic. It has about 1,300 inhabitants.

== Administrative division ==
Petrovice consists of 18 municipal parts (in brackets population according to the 2021 census):

- Petrovice (659)
- Brod (8)
- Kojetín (104)
- Krchov (18)
- Kuní (51)
- Kuníček (18)
- Mašov (15)
- Mezihoří (16)
- Obděnice (83)
- Ohrada (23)
- Porešín (13)
- Radešice (19)
- Radešín (27)
- Skoupý (75)
- Týnčany (63)
- Vilasova Lhota (46)
- Zahrádka (33)
- Žemličkova Lhota (41)

== Etymology ==
The name is derived from the personal name Petr, meaning "the village of Petr's people".

== Geography ==
Petrovice is located about 19 kilometres (12 mi) east of Příbram and 38 km (24 mi) south of Prague. It lies on the border between the Vlašim Uplands and Benešov Uplands. The highest point is at 684 m (2,244 ft) above sea level. The Brzina Stream flows through the municipality.

== History ==
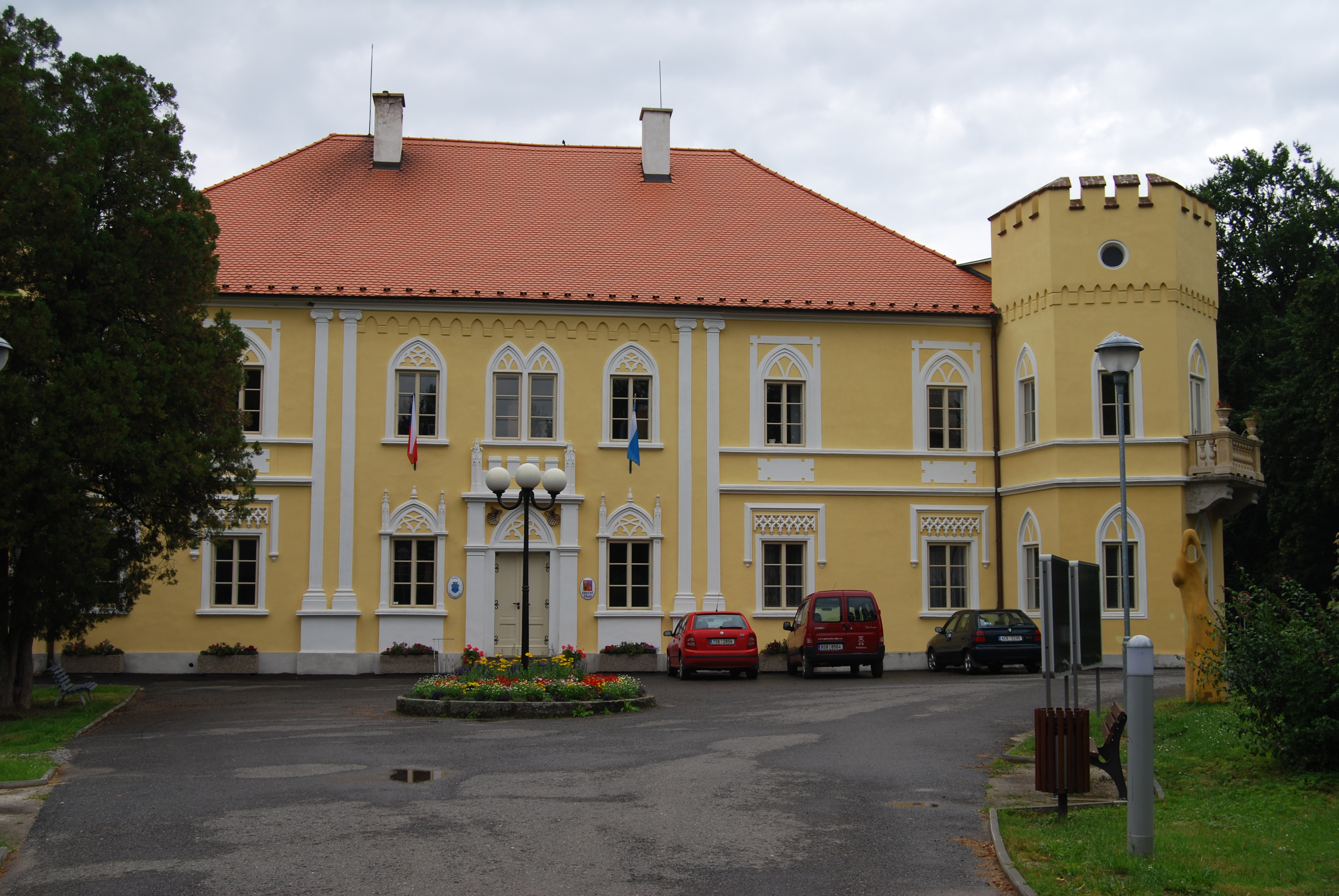
Petrovice Castle, now the municipal office

The first written mention of Petrovice is from 1219. For several centuries, the village was owned by various small noble families. Between 1601 and 1604, it was property of Jakub Krčín. From 1650 until 1773, Petrovice was owned by the Jesuits, who had the greatest influence on the development of the village.

== Demographics ==
Historical population

Year	Pop.	±%
1869	2,989	—
1880	3,101	+3.7%
1890	2,950	−4.9%
1900	2,805	−4.9%
1910	2,679	−4.5%

Year	Pop.	±%
1921	2,613	−2.5%
1930	2,362	−9.6%
1950	1,860	−21.3%
1961	1,735	−6.7%
1970	1,532	−11.7%

Year	Pop.	±%
1980	1,417	−7.5%
1991	1,445	+2.0%
2001	1,402	−3.0%
2011	1,319	−5.9%
2021	1,312	−0.5%

Source: Censuses

== Transport ==
There are no railways or major roads passing through the municipality.

== Sights ==
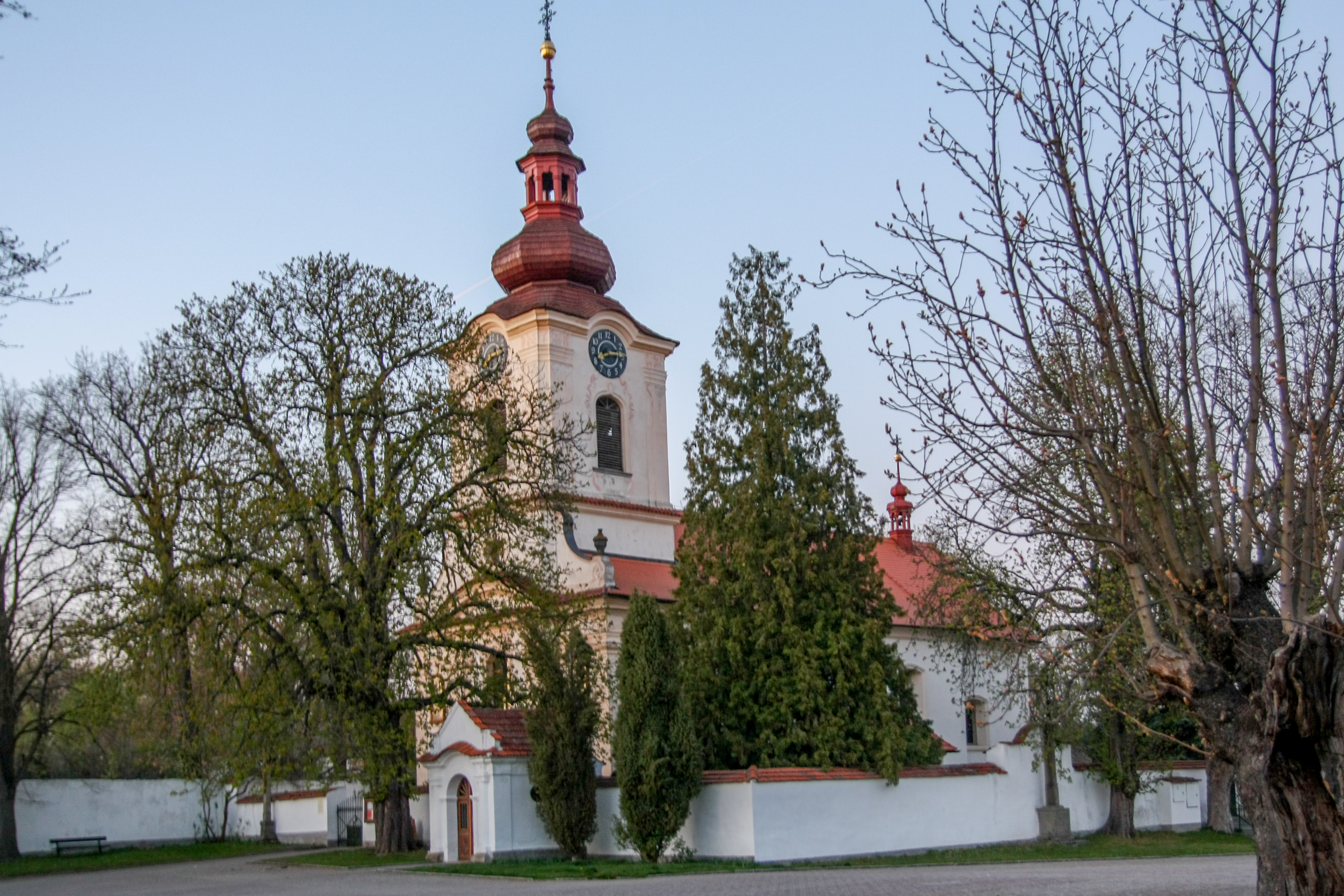
Church of Saints Peter and Paul

The Church of Saints Peter and Paul was originally a medieval church from the 13th century, which was extended and rebuilt in the Baroque style in the 17th and 18th centuries. A valuable early Gothic presbytery has been preserved.

The Petrovice Castle was built as a Jesuit residence. The original Baroque building was rebuilt several times; its present neo-Gothic form dates from the 19th century. Today it houses the municipal office.

The historical character of the Kojetín village has been preserved and the village is protected as a village monument zone.

== Notable people ==
- Jan Josef Švagr (1885–1969), architect
