= Kobe Mosque =

Mosque in Kobe, Hyōgo, Japan

- 神戸モスク
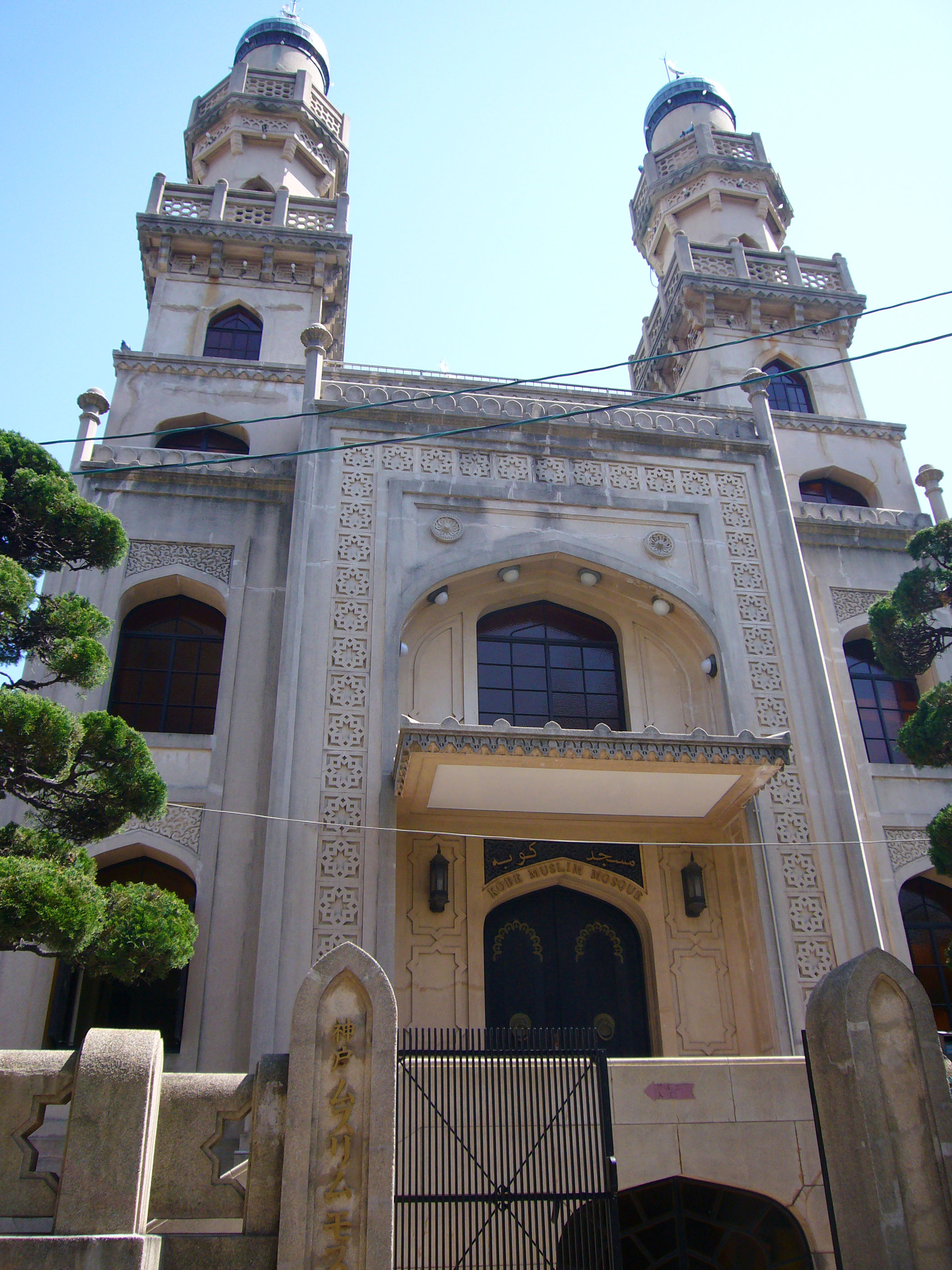

- Location within Hyōgo Prefecture

Religion
- Affiliation: Islam
- Ecclesiastical or organisational status: Mosque
- Status: Active

Location
- Location: 2-25-14 Nakayamate Dori, Chuo-ku, Kōbe-shi, Hyōgo Prefecture
- Interactive map of Kobe Mosque
- Coordinates: 34°41′46″N 135°11′16″E

Architecture
- Architect: Jan Josef Švagr
- Style: Indo-Islamic
- Completed: 1935
- Minaret: 2

Website
- https://www.kobemosque.com/

The Kōbe Mosque (Japanese: 神戸モスク, romanized: Kōbe Mosuku), also known as the Kōbe Muslim Mosque (Japanese: 神戸ムスリムモスク, romanized: Kōbe Musurimu Mosuku, is a mosque located in Kōbe, in the Hyōgo Prefecture of Japan. Founded in October 1935, it is Japan's first mosque. Its construction was funded by donations collected by the Islamic Committee of Kōbe from 1928. (Note: Aga Khan III was a major contributor. He facilitated a meeting between the then East Pakistan Prime Minister and the Emperor of Japan to discuss the building of a mosque in Japan. The Emperor offered land for the mosque's construction.) The mosque was confiscated by the Imperial Japanese Navy in 1943, survived air raids in 1945, and withstood the Great Hanshin earthquake of 1995. It is located in the Kitano-cho foreign district of Kobe, one of the city's best-known tourist areas which features many old western style buildings.

The mosque was built in traditional Indo-Islamic style by the Czech architect Jan Josef Švagr (1885–1969), the architect of a number of Western religious buildings throughout Japan.

As of 2024, it was one of 113 mosques in Japan.

== History ==
The Kobe Mosque's construction, initiated by the Islamic Committee of Kobe in 1928, overcame financial and logistical hurdles. However, it was confiscated by the Imperial Japanese Navy in 1943 during World War II but survived the 1945 air raids largely unscathed. The mosque was damaged during the Great Hanshin earthquake of 1995 but did not completely collapse. Due to its endurance, it has also been called the "Miracle Mosque."

== Architecture ==
Constructed in 1935 by the Takenaka Corporation, the mosque has a reinforced concrete structure. Its architectural style is a fusion of traditional Asian-Turkish influences and was designed by architect Jan Josef Švagr.

Located at 2 Nakayamate Douri, Chuo-Ku, the mosque spans three levels above ground and one underground level. Its roofing comprises a combination of flat roofs and domes with wooden structures and copper roofing. The walls are finished with exposed-aggregate.

== Gallery ==
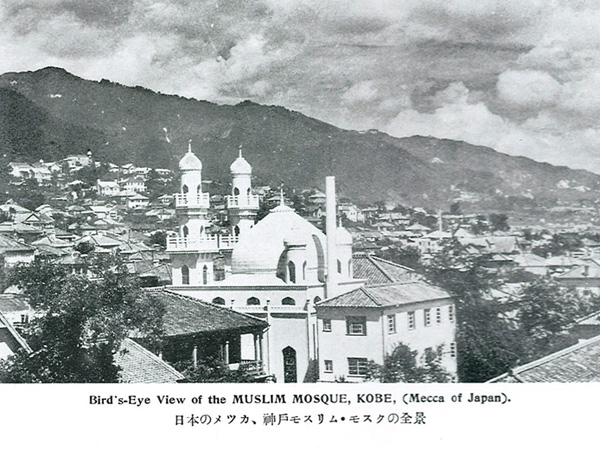
An aerial view of the mosque in 1936, showcasing its early architectural grandeur and historical significance

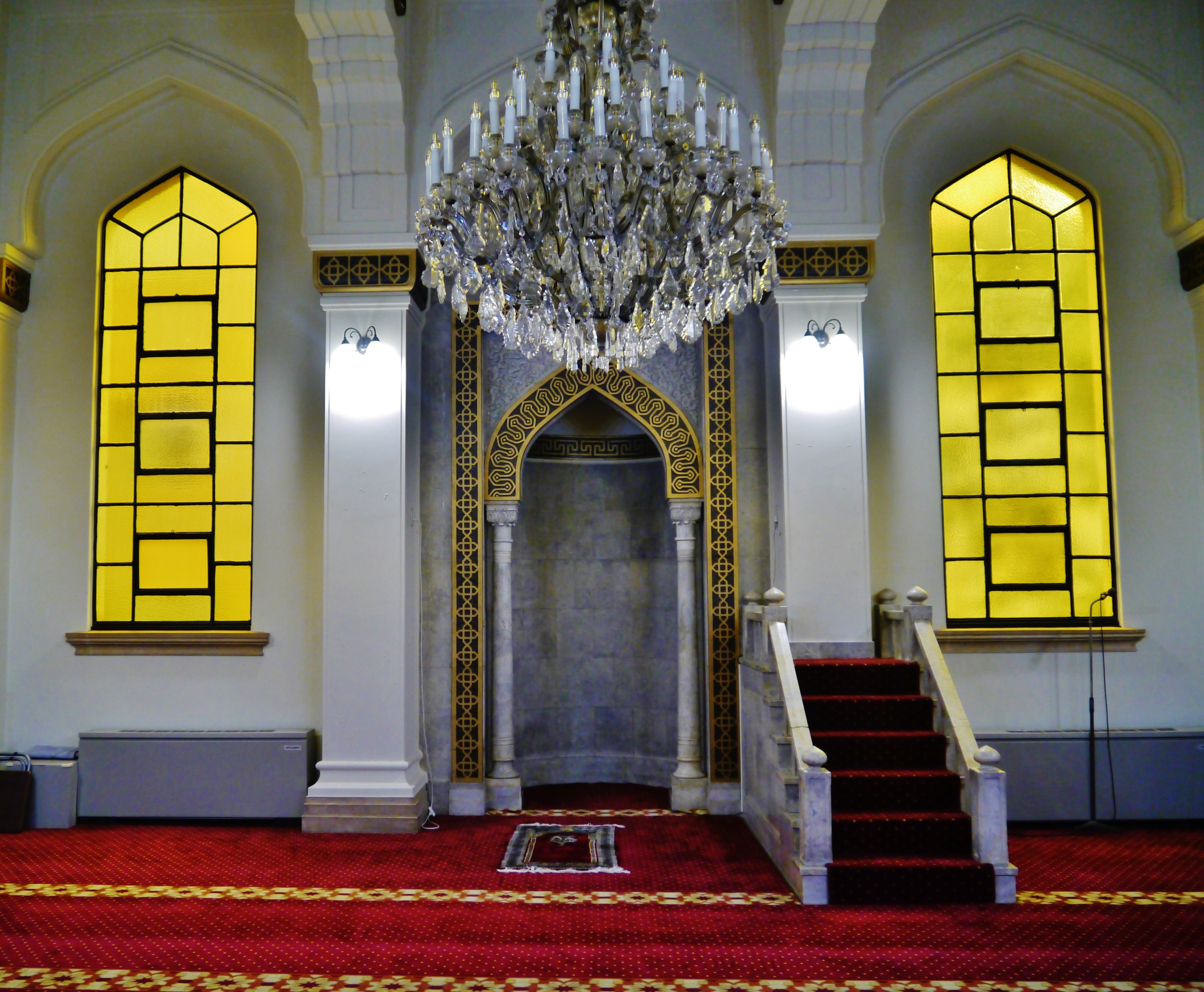
The prayer hall

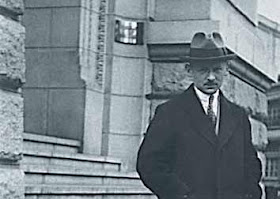
Architect (Jan Josef Švagr; 7 September 1885 – 26 March 1969) of Kobe Mosque in Japan

== See also ==
- Islam in Japan
- List of mosques in Japan
