= Uzbeks in Japan =

在日ウズベキスタン人

Total population
- 7,362 (in December, 2025)

Regions with significant populations
- Tokyo, Nagoya, Chiba

Languages
- Uzbek, Russian, Dari, Japanese

Religion
- Sunni Islam

Related ethnic groups
- Uzbeks in China, Uyghurs in Japan, Kazakhs in Japan, Afghans in Japan

Uzbeks in Japan consist of ethnic Uzbek people that were born in or have immigrated to Japan. As of December 2025, there were 7,362 Uzbeks living in Japan.

== History ==
The first Uzbeks settled to Japan during the Soviet-era in the 1970s, where most of them worked in factories.

Since the independence of Uzbekistan, the population of Uzbeks in Japan grew rapidly. From only 184 Uzbeks in 2000, the number of Uzbeks in Japan grew close to 4,000 in 2018, making it one of the fastest growing foreign population in Japan. It is also the largest Central Asian and the second largest community from former Soviet Union after Russia. It also make the fifth largest Muslim community in Japan after Indonesia, Bangladesh, Pakistan and Malaysia. Many Uzbeks are students or factory and restaurant workers, as well as those working as translators for Russians. There are also a few Japanese-Uzbek non-profit organisations made by Uzbek community and Japanese volunteers.

== Notable people ==
- ANoRA, Uzbek-born Japanese singer
- Timur Dadabaev, Uzbek-born researcher, studied at Tsukuba University
- Arfiya Eri, Japanese politician with Uzbek-Uyghur background

== See also ==
- Japan–Uzbekistan relations
