= Kō Nakata =

Japanese Islamic scholar (born 1960)

- 中田 考
- Born: 1960 (age 65–66); Okayama Prefecture, Japan
- Other name: Hasan
- Occupations: Islamic scholar; author

Academic background
- Education: University of Tokyo; Cairo University

Kō Nakata (Japanese: 中田 考, Hepburn: Nakata Kō; born 1960) is a Japanese Islamic scholar and author. He has written and translated dozens of books related to Islam and Islamic studies, as well as a light novel and manga.

== Biography ==
=== Early life and academic career ===
Nakata was born in Okayama Prefecture in 1960 and raised in Ashiya and Nishinomiya, both in Hyōgo Prefecture. He attended Nada Junior and Senior High School. Nakata said of his time at school: "I simply didn't like studying that much, so all I did was wrestle, shogi, and read novels ... I hated school, so I skipped a lot, and I still have dreams about not getting enough attendance and failing. But looking back now, Nada didn't have any school rules, so it was really free." He inspired Kō Nagata, the main character of his Nada classmate Hideki Wada's novel Nada Monogatari.

After briefly attending the Waseda University Faculty of Political Science and Economics, Nakata transferred to the University of Tokyo Faculty of Letters the next year. He graduated from that university and, after finishing master studies at the University of Tokyo Graduate School of Humanities, got a PhD from Cairo University. He later worked abroad in research, obtaining Embassy of Japan in Saudi Arabia (1992–1994) and the Japan Society for the Promotion of Science Cairo Research Center (1997–1998). He later returned to Japan, becoming a professor at the Doshisha University Faculty of Theology from 2003 to 2011.

=== Writing and media career ===
Nakata became interested in Islamic studies while at the University of Tokyo, and he converted to Islam in 1983. He has written and translated dozens of books related to Islam and Islamic studies. Hiromi Shimada called him "Japan's most renowned Islamic scholar". Maki Tahara remarked that "in Japan's small Islamic studies industry, Nakata and [Akari] Iiyama are both on the fringes, albeit in different directions". He has also frequented the media as a commentator on Islamic subjects. Fumio Miyata of Real Sound called him "well-versed in Islamic society".

Nakata wrote a light novel called Ore no Imōto ga Karifu na wake ga nai! (俺の妹がカリフなわけがない!), illustrated by Manaru Tenkawa. Its title was inspired by Oreimo. Originally sold as a doujinshi at Comiket, it was published by Shobunsha on 14 July 2020. Yuuki Honda of Kai-You called it an "unparalleled and unprecedented" light novel, citing its focus on the concept of the caliph. He and Tenkawa had previously co-authored a manga called Hasan Nakata Kō no Manga de Wakaru Islam Nyūmon (ハサン中田考のマンガでわかるイスラーム入門).

=== Islamic State connections ===
In March 2013, Nakata started visiting areas controlled by the Islamic State (IS), where he often contacted IS commanders. At one point, an IS commander asked him to hire a journalist and a lawyer as part of a planned trial for Haruna Yukawa, before airstrikes by the United States made it impossible to reach any hostages. On 22 January 2015, he and Kōsuke Tsuneoka, a journalist also suspected of having ties to the Islamic State, held a press conference at the Foreign Correspondents' Club of Japan, where he made an Arabic-language plea asking IS to meet with him regarding the hostage situation of Yukawa and Kenji Goto while keeping the two alive for 72 hours, criticized the Ministry of Foreign Affairs' handling of the response to the hostage situation, and proposed providing humanitarian aid to refugees located in Islamic State-controlled territory instead of paying the ransom the Islamic State demanded for both hostages.

In October 2014, a Hokkaido University student placed under questioning by the Tokyo Metropolitan Police Department Public Security Bureau informed them that Nakata had attempted to recruit him to IS. Another man had also contacted Nakata and planned to travel to Syria in August 2014, but failed due to dissuasion from his family. On 2 July 2019, the PSB charged Nakata and several others, including Tsuneoka and the student, for "preparing and conspiring to commit private war"; this was the first time such charges were made in Japan. On 22 July, the Tokyo District Public Prosecutors Office dropped charges against them, including Nakata.

== Personal life ==
Nakata's Islamic name is Hasan. He also runs a recycling shop in Toshima.
