= Jan Josef Švagr =

Jan Josef Švagr (7 September 1885, Týnčany – 26 March 1969, Claypole) was a Czech architect who worked mainly in Japan. He moved to Japan in 1923 and started working there, designing many buildings. Švagr left Japan due to the war in April 1941 to Latin America where he continued to participate in several projects. The following is a list of his works in Japan.

Year	Work	Location	ref
1925?	Kouran Girls' Jr-Sr High School (destroyed)	Yokohama, Kanagawa	
1925	Siber Hegner Co. Warehouse (demolished)	Yokohama, Kanagawa	
1928	Standard Oil Co. Office Bldg. (demolished)	Yokohama, Kanagawa	
1929	Rising Sun Petroleum Co. Office Bldg. (demolished)	Yokohama, Kanagawa	
1929	Rising Sun Petroleum Co. Housing (demolished)	Yokohama, Kanagawa	
1931	Missil Mease's House (demolished)	Yokohama, Kanagawa	
1931	Kent's House (demolished)	Yokohama, Kanagawa	
1932	Official Residence of The Canadian ambassador	Akasaka, Tokyo	
1933	St. Luke's International Hospital	Tsukiji, Tokyo	
1933	Yamate Catholic Church (Sacred Heart Cathedral)	Yokohama, Kanagawa	
1933	Catholic Diocese Of Fukuoka Bishop's Residence	Fukuoka, Fukuoka	
1934	St. Joseph International School Auditorium and Gymnasium (demolished)	Yokohama, Kanagawa	
1934	The House Of The Meditation	Nerima, Tokyo	
1935	Marguerite Bourgeoys Center (Ex-Notre-Dame Monastery)	Fukushima, Fukushima	
1935	The Kobe Muslim Mosque	Kobe, Hyōgo	
1936	Seishin Joshi Gakuin Jr-Sr High School Addition	Shirokane, Tokyo	
1937	E.V.Bernard's House	Yokohama, Kanagawa	
1938	Hodogaya Catholic Church	Yokohama, Kanagawa	
1938	Helm House Apartment (demolished)	Yokohama, Kanagawa	
1939	Toyonaka Catholic Church	Toyonaka, Osaka	
