= Ryoichi Mita =

Japanese Quran translator

- Born: 19 December 1892; Yamaguchi Prefecture, Japan
- Died: 29 May 1983 (aged 90)
- Education: Yamaguchi Commercial College

Ryoichi Mita (三田 了一, Mita Ryōichi; 19 December 1892 – 29 May 1983), also known as Umar Mita, was a Japanese Muslim who is considered the first-ever Muslim to translate the Quran into the Japanese language.

== Biography ==
Mita moved to China at the age of 24 and lived there for almost three decades straight (he briefly returned to Japan in 1921 but moved back to China the following year and found initial employment in the railway industry). During his long life in China, he saw Islam firsthand and developed an interest in it, becoming a preeminent consultant to Japanese forces on Islam-related questions after he had been hired as a propagandist, although it wasn't until 1941 that he formally converted. Throughout this period, Mita was known to have met and had close discussions with Shūmei Ōkawa, another translator of the Quran and fellow pan-Asianist. Mita engaged in spy work for the Imperial Japanese Army and wrote of the need to propagandise Muslims in China in order to obtain their support against the Han Chinese forces.

After the end of World War II, Mita focused his efforts solely on Islam. He joined the recently founded Association of Japanese Muslims (日本ムスリム協会) in 1952, becoming its leader from 1960 to 1962, whereafter Mita left for Pakistan and Saudi Arabia so as to learn Arabic and translate the Quran into his native tongue, a task that he would complete a decade later in 1972. His translation avoided terms with Buddhist connotations in favour of simple native phrases and occasionally terms with Christian precedent.

== Published works ==
- For the Sake of Comprehending Islam (イスラム 理解 の 為に)
- Stories of the Sahaba (サハバ 物語)
- Introduction to Islam (イスラム 入門)
