= Asakusa International Theater =

Building in Tokyo, Japan

Coordinates: 35°42′55.56″N 139°47′32.41″E

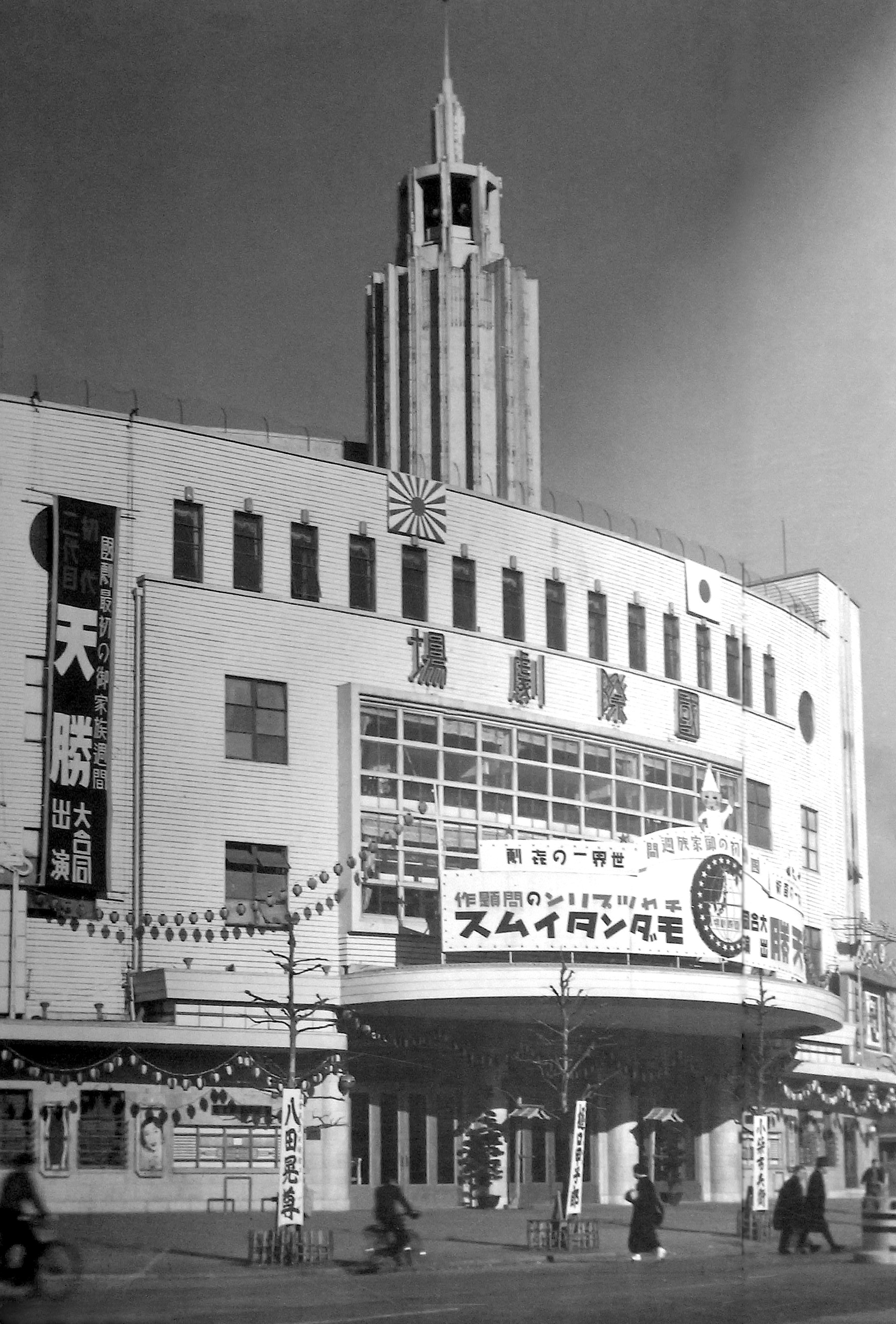
- Interactive map of Asakusa International Theater
- Address: Asakusa, Tokyo; Japan
- Operator: Shochiku
- Capacity: 3,860

Construction
- Opened: July 3, 1937
- Demolished: 1982

Asakusa International Theater (浅草国際劇場, Asakusa Kokusai Gekijō) was a 3,860-seat theater located in Asakusa, Taitō, Tokyo, Japan, which was used for concerts and theatrical performances. Opened in 1937 and closed in 1982, it was demolished and replaced by the Asakusa View Hotel in 1985. It was owned and operated by Shochiku and primarily featured the Shōchiku Shōjo Kagekidan (松竹少女歌劇団), an all-woman musical theatre troupe. The SKD often appeared in a double bill with a film. Other artists that performed at the theater include King Crimson and Whitesnake.
