= Mitsutarō Yamaoka =

First Japanese pilgrim to Mecca

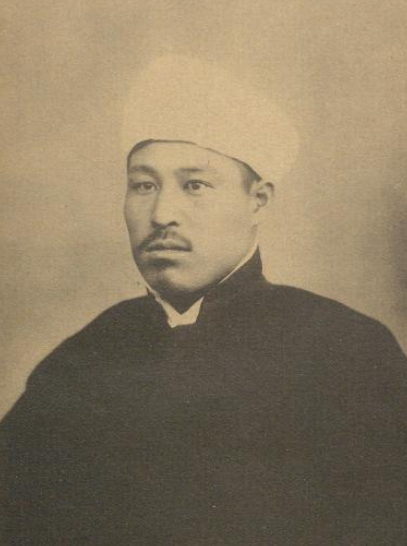

Mitsutarō Yamaoka (Japanese: 山岡光太郎; 7 March 1880 – 23 September 1959), also known as Umar Yamaoka (Japanese: ウマル・ヤマオカ) was a Japanese Islamic scholar known for being the first known Japanese pilgrim to Mecca.

== Biography ==
Yamaoka was born in Fukuyama, Hiroshima prefecture, Japan.

Yamaoka studied Russian at the Tokyo University of Foreign Studies. He became a military volunteer in the Russo-Japanese War and graduated university in 1905.

In 1909, Yamaoka met Abdurreshid Ibrahim. Ibrahim highly advised him to convert to Islam at a stay in Mumbai. He converted to Islam and accompanied him on a pilgrimage to Mecca, making himself the first ever Japanese pilgrim to Mecca. After Mecca, Yamaoka also visited Mount Ararat, Medina, Damascus, Jerusalem, Cairo, and Istanbul. He returned to Japan via Russia in 1910.

Yamaoka published a book titled 「アラビヤ縦断記」 "Arabian Longitudinal Records" in 1912, which was insisted to the Meiji Emperor and Empress Shōken. He also wrote articles about Islam and translated some parts of the Quran.

In 1923, Yamaoka moved to Cairo for a year, then to Istanbul for three years, and returned to Japan in 1927.

Yamaoka died of old age on 23 September 1959.
