= Ahmadiyya in Japan =

Islamic movement

Ahmadiyya is an Islamic community in Japan. The history of the Ahmadiyya Muslim Community in Japan begins after a number of mentions by Mirza Ghulam Ahmad, who showed a particular interest in introducing Islam to the Japanese people. The first Ahmadi Muslim missionary to be sent to Japan was Sufi Abdul Qadeer, who was sent by the second Caliph. He arrived in Japan on June 4, 1935. Today there is one purpose-built mosque, the largest in the country, representing an estimated 300 Ahmadi Muslims.

== History ==
=== Early mentions ===
Ahmad showed a particular interest in introducing Islam to the Japanese people. He stated in 1905 that "Japanese people have shown an interest in Islam. Therefore, a comprehensive book should be published to introduce Islam [in Japan]" and that "If God commands, I would go to Japan today without learning [the Japanese] language". In response done of his companions, including Mufti Muhammad Sadiq, wrote letters to individual Japanese. In 1945, the Second Caliph, Mirza Basheer-ud-Din Mahmood Ahmad is said to have seen in a dream that God would influence the Japanese to "attract their hearts towards Ahmadiyya and gradually they will gain momentum and strength. They will readily answer to my call just as birds answered the call of Prophet Abraham"

On September 8, 1951, Zafarullah Khan, a companion of Ahmad, who was then Pakistan’s foreign minister and the country’s delegate to the United Nations Security Council, spoke at the Treaty of San Francisco with Japan. Citing Muhammad’s example of forgiveness and peace at the Occupation of Mecca, Khan spoke in favour of a more humane treatment towards Japan, following the Second World War. At that time Pakistan was the only country to hold this position.

=== Early efforts ===
The first Ahmadi Muslim missionary to be sent to Japan was Sufi Abdul Qadeer who was sent during the Second Caliphate. He arrived in Japan, on June 4, 1935. Based in Kobe, Qadeer was later joined by another companion, Abdul Ghafoor. However, due to the escalating war, the mission had to be abandoned, and the two missionaries had to return to their country in 1941.

Efforts were revived during the late 1960s and the 1970s. Mirza Mubarak Ahmad, a prominent Ahmadi Muslim and later Major Abdul Majeed, a retired soldier and a missionary of the Community was sent by the Third Caliph. During this period, missionary activity was centered in Tokyo. From 1975 to 1983, Ataul Mujeeb Rashed served as a missionary in Japan. Methods adopted by Rashed included flier distribution, such as at the Hachiko exit of the Shibuya Station, and preaching over a loudspeaker, whilst driving a car printed with religious slogans. As advised by the caliph, and recommended by Rashed, the headquarters shifted to Nagoya, when a mission house was bought in the city in 1981. In 1989, a Japanese translation of the Quran was published. The Quran was translated by Atsushi Kobayashi, a 1957 convert, who adopted the name, Muhammad Uwais Kobayashi.

=== Journeys by caliphs ===
The first caliph to visit Japan was Mirza Tahir Ahmad, whose visit in 1989 coincided with the publication of a translation of the Quran into Japanese, published by the Ahmadiyya Muslim Community.

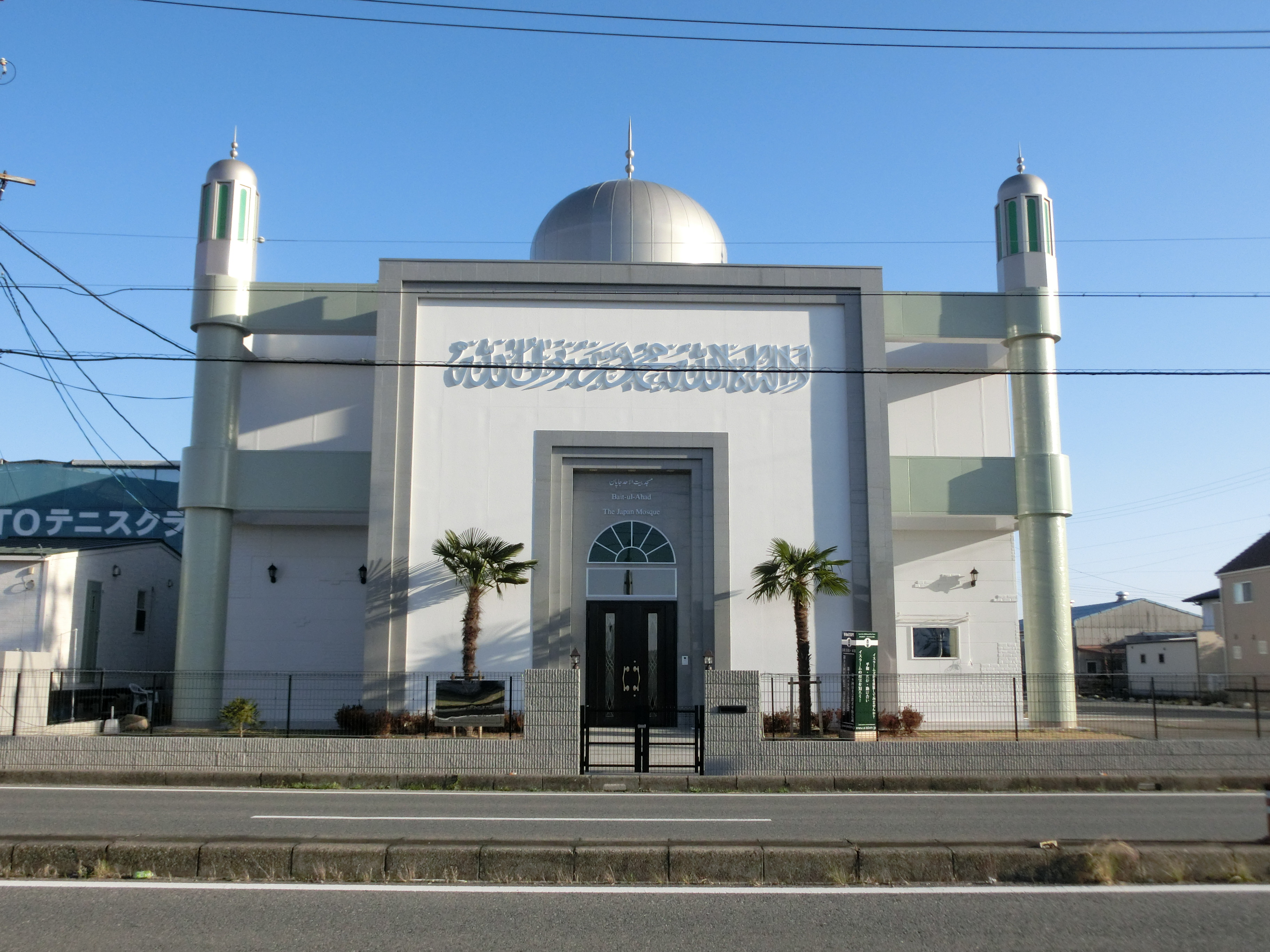
The Japan Mosque, the largest in the country, was opened in 2015 by the caliph

The current caliph, Mirza Masroor Ahmad visited the country in 2006, 2013 and also in 2015 to inaugurate the first purpose-built Ahmadiyya mosque in Japan. The opening ceremony, which was held on November 21, 2015, was attended by local residents, religious leaders, monks, and Ahmadi Muslim representatives from over 27 countries.

== Demographics ==
Today, there are an estimated 300 Ahmadi Muslims in Japan. The majority consist of foreigners from Pakistan, India and Nepal, many of whom arrived after the 1980s. Roughly 20 are Japanese, the majority of which are women married to foreign men. The Community is primarily centered around Nagoya and Tokyo.

There is one mission house, first bought in 1981, and located in Meitō-ku, a north-eastern ward of Nagoya, and one purpose-built mosque in Tsushima, a city which lies to the west of Nagoya. The mosque, constructed in 2015, and identified as The Japan Mosque, is the largest in the country. It has a capacity of over 500 people.

== See also ==
- Islam in Japan
