= Sultan Nour =

Syrian-born politician

Sultan Noor
- スルタン・ヌール

Member of the Shonai Town Council
- In office 20 July 2021 – 15 July 2025

Personal details
- Born: Sultan Noor, سلطان نور; 20 August 1971 (age 55) Aleppo, Syria
- Party: Independent
- Education: Alexandria University

Sultan Nour (Japanese: スルタン・ヌール; born 20 August 1971) is a Syrian-Japanese politician.

He is the first Arab Muslim local member of the assembly in Japan.

== Personal life ==
Sultan Nour was born in Aleppo, Syria. He started learning karate at 4 years old and started to gain interest in Japan. At 12, he moved to Egypt. He graduated from a sports university, and became a national public officer in Egypt.

In 2001, he moved to Japan and in 2013, he became a Japanese citizen.

He married a Syrian woman in 2016, then moved to Shōnai, Yamagata. He has a son, Yashin (Japanese: 矢進) and a daughter, Sana (Japanese: 彩菜). He got elected town council member of Shōnai on 18 July 2021.
