= Tatar and Bashkir community in Japan =

Япониядә татар һәм башкорт җәмгыяте (Tatar) Японияла башҡорт һәм татар общинаһы (Bashkir)

Total population
- 600—2000

Regions with significant populations
- Japan

Languages
- Tatar · Bashkir · Japanese

Related ethnic groups
- Majority Sunni Islam

The Tatar and Bashkir community in Japan was founded by migrants from Russia who came to Japan after the Red Army victory in Civil War in Russia. Most of them settled in Tokyo and Kobe.

Most of them were a religious figures. They built the first Japanese Mosque that known as a Tokyo Mosque (was destroyed in 1985-1988 after an earthquake, but in 1998 was reconstructed by the Turkish government) and created the Islam gained government recognition.

== History ==
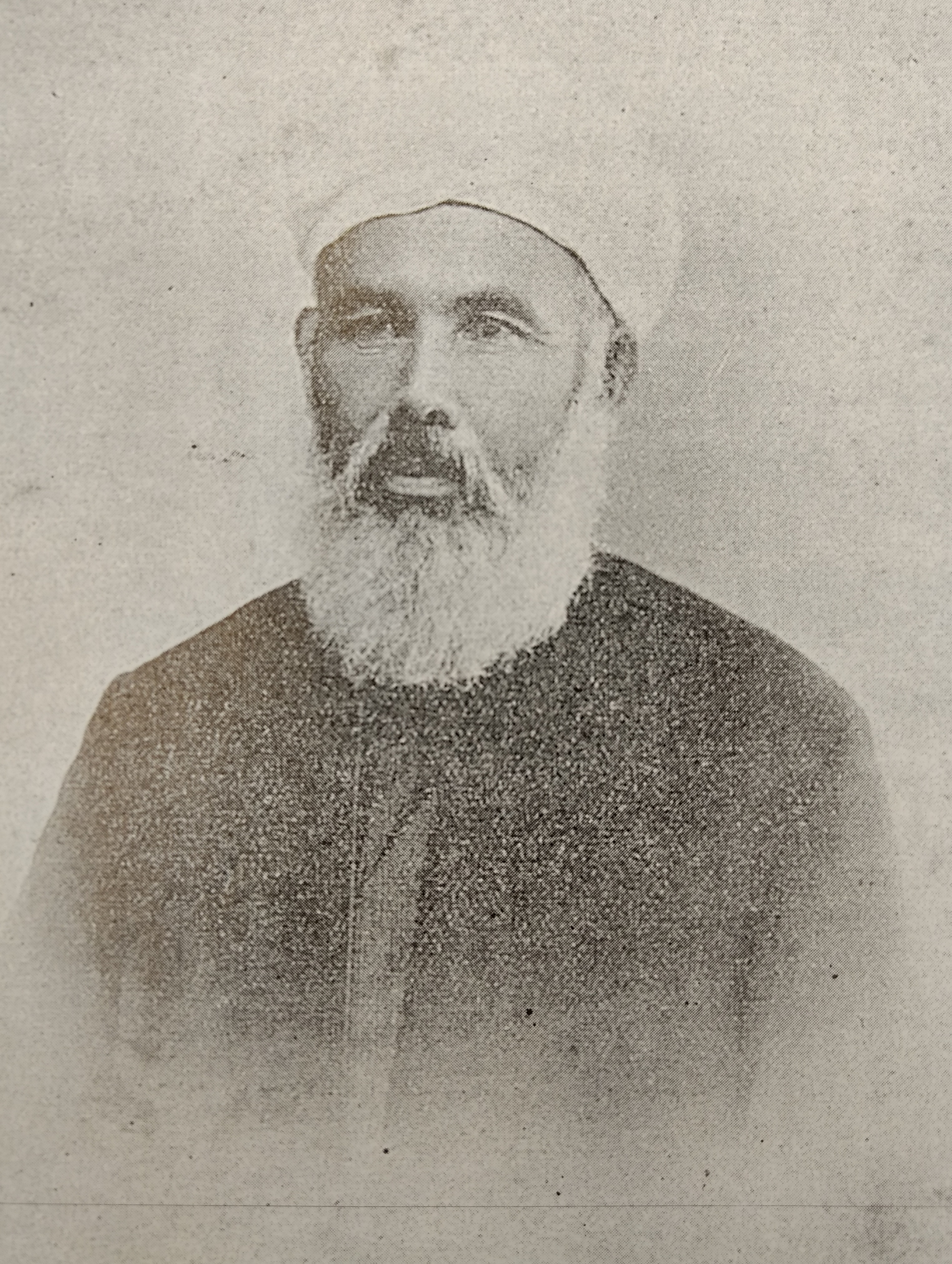
Abdurrashid Ibrahimov, one of the first Tatar ambassador in Japan

Tatars and Bashkirs migrated to the countries and territories of the Far East (Manchuria, Korea, and Japan) after the end of the Russian Civil War and the final establishment of Soviet power in the Far East. The overwhelming majority of these migrants were members of the clergy who rejected the Soviet regime because of its anti-religious policies. The city of Harbin in Manchuria became the first major center of migration for Tatars and Bashkirs. They founded there an organization known as the «Harbin Society». Later most of the members migrated to Japan, particularly to cities such as Yokohama (where a relatively large Tatar community had initially formed) Tokyo, Nagoya, Kumamoto and Kobe.

Abdurrashid Ibrahimov played a key role in establishing and developing relations between the Tatars and Japan. He became a mediator between the Japanese and Muslim communities and facilitated the resettlement of many Tatar families in Japan. He lived in Japan afther the emigration in 1933 for the rest of his life. The Bashkir imam Muhammed-Gabdulkhay Kurbangaliev arrived in Tokyo with his like-minded people in 1924 and also made a significant contribution to the growth of the Tatar-Bashkir community. Relations with Kurbangaliev were quite tense among some representatives of the Tatar community, including Gayaz Iskhaki. This was because most of these representatives planned to establish an independent Idel-Ural, whereas Kurbangaliev advocated the unification of all Muslims under the banner of the Japanese Empire that was based on the perceived commonality of the Ural-Altaic people. In 1938 Kurbangaliev was deported from Japan.

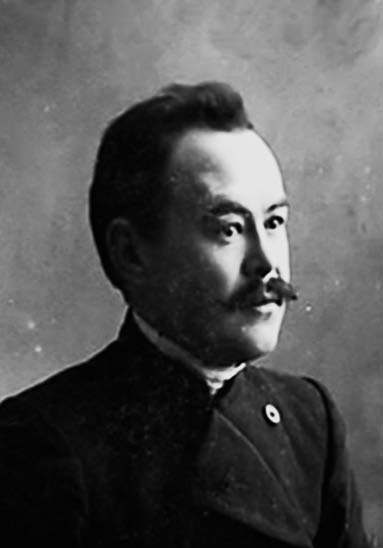
Muhammed-Gabdulkhay Kurbangaliev, one of the leader of Tatar and Bashkir community in Japan

The efforts of the community joined to building the first mosque in Japan in 1935 that was located in Kobe, then three years later a mosque in Tokyo. The last building was destroyed in 1985 but 15 years ago rebuilt by the assistance of the Turkey. Islam subsequently gained official recognition. Children studied Japanese, Tatar, Russian and English at school, while Kurbangaliev taught religious subjects.

In 1939 Prime Minister Kiichiro Hiranuma declared that Islam had equal rights in Japan with Buddhism and Christianity.

Japanese interest in the Tatars and Bashkirs was driven by the pre-war concept of Turanism, whose ideology emphasized the unity of the Ural-Altaic people (a category that was believed to include both the Turkic people and the Japanese). The Hungarians were also considered fraternal to the Japanese, with whom they had maintained relations since 1910, when the Hungarian Turanian Society was founded. It published the journal «Turan», which regularly featured articles on Japan and the need for closer relations between the Hungarian royal dynasty and the Japanese imperial court. Kitagawa Shikazo (1886–1943) that was one of the proponents of Turanism claimed that the Japanese descended from the Tungusic branch of the Turanian family along with the Koreans and Manchus and were therefore related to other Turanian people such as the Turks, Mongols and Finno-Ugric peoples in terms of blood, language and culture. Furthermore, Japan was involved in a plot with Young Turk exiles to establish a puppet state in Central Asia and Xinjiang with a former Ottoman prince as its monarch during the 1930s. The Japanese authorities therefore invited the Ottoman prince Abdulkerim and several Young Turk exiles who were opposed to Atatürk to assist them in establishing a puppet state in Xinjiang, with the Ottoman prince serving as its sultan. All of these Turkish exiles were opponents of the Turkish leader Mustafa Kemal Atatürk. Turkish adviser to the Uyghurs in the First East Turkestan Republic Mustafa Ali was opposed to Atatürk. Muhsin Çapanolu was also an opponent of Atatürk and both held pan-Turanian views. Mahmud Nadim Bey, another member of the group, served as an adviser to the Uyghur separatists. The Turkish government under Mustafa Kemal Atatürk reacted angrily to the plot and the Turkish embassy in Japan denounced Japan's plan to establish a puppet state, referring to it as a «Muslim Manchukuo».. Atatürk himself was uninterested in pan-Turanism because of the numerous problems facing the young Turkish Republic and he did not want members of the Ottoman royal family to attempt to establish a new monarchical state that could undermine the Turkish Republic. TASS claimed that Uyghur Prime Minister Sabit Damulla had invited Turkish emigrants in India and Japan with their anti-Kemalist organizations to organize his armed forces.

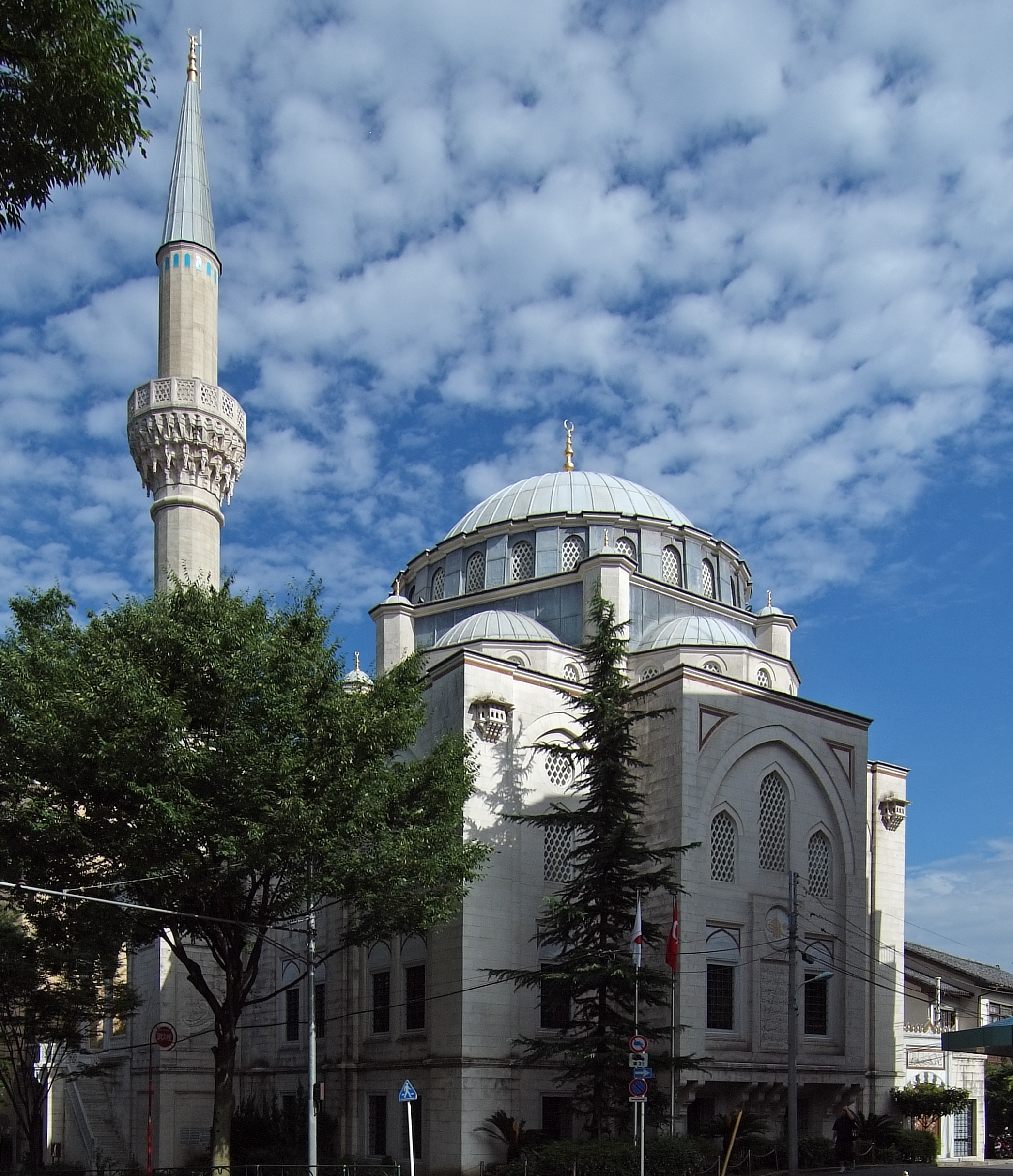
Tokyo Camii, at Shibuya-ku Tokyo Japan

Many Tatars and Bashkirs in Japan after the end of World War II were captured by the United States and the USSR. Muhammed-Gabdulkhay Kurbangaliev was arrested in Manchuria and sentenced in Moscow to 10 years in prison under Article 58 of the Criminal Code «For counterrevolutionary activity». He served his sentence in Vladimir Prison until 1955. He was released (according to him) on August 26 1955 and went to live with an acquaintance in Chelyabinsk, who was supporting him. He repeatedly asked Soviet officials for permission to emigrate to Tokyo, but was denied and then he died in Chelyabinsk in 1972.

In the 1950s Tatars and Bashkirs emigrated to Turkey, United States, Australia and other neighboring countries (except USSR and China).

Many Tatars and Bashkirs who remained in Japan after the war actively participated in film, played a white people in Japanese films thanks to their European appearance. Famous actors included Gabdulla Safa (also known as a Roy James), Omer Yusuf, Osman Yusuf, Andrew Hughes and others.

== See also ==
- Islam in Japan
