= Gainan Safa =

- Гайнан Сафа
- Born: 23 December 1898; Lyampa, Krasnoufimsky District, Perm Governorate, Russian Empire
- Died: January 9, 1984 (aged 85); Tokyo, Japan

Gainan Safa (Tatar: Гайнан Сафа, December 23, 1898, Perm Governorate, Russian Empire – January 9, 1984, Tokyo, Japan) was a Muslim religious leader and imam of the Tokyo Mosque from 1967 to 1984. Also known as a father of Japanese actor Gabdulla Safa.

== Biography ==
Gainan Mukhamet Safa was born on December 23, 1898, in the village of Lyampa, Krasnoufimsky District, Perm Governorate (now Achitsky Municipal District, Sverdlovsk Oblast).

According to research by the renowned Bashkir writer and scholar Kirey Mergen, he fought on the White Army side during the Russian Civil War. After the Red Army victory he moved to Japan across Manchuria. He lived in Tokyo with Muhammed-Gabdulkhay Kurbangaliev who was another Bashkir imam.

From 1933 to 1967, he served as muezzin of the Tokyo Mosque. After the death of Imam Sharifullah Hazrat Miftakhetdin, who held the position of chief imam, he assumed his post until his death on January 9, 1984.
