= Ertuğrul Gazi Mosque =

Mosque in Ashgabat, Turkmenistan

Coordinates: 37°55′59″N 58°23′56″E

Religion
- Affiliation: Sunni Islam
- Rite: Hanafi
- Status: Active

Location
- Location: Ashgabat, Turkmenistan
- Interactive map of Ertuğrul Gazi Mosque

Architecture
- Architect: Hilmi Şenalp
- Type: Mosque
- Style: Ottoman
- Completed: 1998

Specifications
- Capacity: 5,000
- Minaret: 4
- Materials: Marble

Ertuğrul Gazi Mosque or Ärtogrul Gazy Mosque is a mosque in Ashgabat, Turkmenistan. It is a prominent landmark in Ashgabat with its four minarets and a central dome and has a lavish interior decoration with fine stained glass windows.

== History ==
Mosque portico

The mosque was inaugurated in 1998 after the independence of Turkmenistan in 1990. It is named after Ertuğrul, the father of Osman I, founder of the Ottoman Empire, and was built by Hilmi Şenalp. Several accidental deaths took place during the construction, and this has led to a belief that the mosque is cursed.

The mosque is also known as the Azadi Mosque, after its location on Azadi Street in central Ashgabat, and is described as the largest mosque within the city limits. According to a tourism guide, the idea of building it came from the then Turkish prime minister, Süleyman Demirel, after he visited Turkmenistan in 1992, and construction began in early 1993. It was designed in a neo-Ottoman style by Hilmi Şenalp, born in Konya in 1957, whose firm, Hassa Architecture, also designed the Tokyo Mosque and the Şehitlik Mosque in Berlin.

The scholar Kishwar Rizvi describes his mosques as a signature of Turkish identity exported abroad. The four minarets are about 62 metres high, and the mosque stands in a large courtyard with a fountain, which brings the total area to 2,800 square metres. Its interior includes carved doors, painted decoration, gilded Quranic verses on the walls and ceilings and stained glass windows. Non-Muslim visitors are admitted at certain hours when prayers are not taking place.
