= New Japan's Herald =

Japanese Islamic magazine

- Categories: islam
- Frequency: Monthly
- Founder: Muhammed-Gabdulkhay Kurbangaliev
- Founded: May 25, 1931
- First issue: 1931
- Final issue: 1938
- Country: Japan
- Based in: Tokyo
- Language: Tatar

New Japan's Herald (Tatar: Яңа япун мөхбире) was a Japanese Islamic magazine that was published from 1931 to 1938 by the Tatar and Bashkir community in Japan. Each issue told about life of this community.

== History ==
The magazine was published Muhammed-Gabdulkhay Kurbangaliev who was a mullah in Japan that moved from Russia after Red Army victory in Civil War in Russia. The first issue, released on May 25, 1931, featured a congratulatory message from Japanese political figure Toyama Mitsuru. Initially, the magazine was simply titled Japanese Correspondent (Tatar: Япун мөхбире), but starting with the fourth issue, the adjective New (Tatar: Яңа) was added.

The magazine was published in Tatar language and featured current news and notes from the life of Tatar and Bashkir community in Japan. The magazine's goal was to introduce Muslims to Japan and promote cultural and economic ties between the Japanese and Muslims. It also featured discussions regarding the Tatar language and its transition from the Arabic script to the Latin alphabet. Due to the conflict between Gayaz Iskhaki and Kurbangaliev, supporters of the former criticized the magazine, claiming that its publisher was spreading ideas opposed to the development of the Tatar nation, and demanded its closure.

The magazine was published until 1938, was distributed to 33 countries, and had a large subscriber base. It ceased publication after Muhammed-Gabdulkhay Kurbangaliev was expelled from Japan. About 50 issues were published throughout its existence.

== See also ==
- Islam in Japan
