= Osman Yusuf =

- オスマン・ユセフ
- Born: 20 May 1920; Istanbul, Turkey
- Died: 29 August 1982 (aged 62); Tokyo, Japan
- Occupation: Actor

Osman Yusuf (Japanese: オスマン・ユセフ; May 23, 1920 - August 29, 1982) was a Japanese actor of Tatar descent.

== Biography ==
Osman Yusuf was born on May 23, 1920, in Istanbul. His parents were Tatar emigrants, emigrated from Russia after the October Revolution. Later they moved to Japan.

Due to his family's difficult circumstances, he earned a living as a wrestler. Then, with the development of Japanese cinema, when European-looking actors were needed for certain roles, he began to try his hand at acting. Along with Gabdullah, Safa became the first actor to play European characters in Japanese films.

Osman Yusuf debuted in Raigekitai Shutsudō (1944), where he played an American pilot. Then, with another actor of Tatar descent, Gabdulla Safa, he starred in Akira Kurosawa's Sanshiro Sugata Part II (1945), where he played an American sailor. Later Osman Yusuf and Gabdulla Safa were arrested and sentenced to hard labor, since Turkey declared war on Germany and Japan. After his release he worked at Meiji University.

He continued to actively appear in films before his death on August 29, 1982. He became widely known for his roles in other Japanese movies, including Gekko Kamen - Akuma no Saigo (1959), Mothra (1961), King Kong vs. Godzilla (1963), Mothra vs. Godzilla (1964) and Nippon Chinbotsu (1973).

== Filmography ==
- 1959: Battle in Outer Space
- 1961: Daredevil in the Castle
- 1961: Pigs and Battleships
- 1961: Mothra
- 1969: All Monsters Attack
- 1974: Prophecies of Nostradamus
- 1976: Ningyo-tei ibun muhō-gai no moto (Fernsehserie)
- 1980: The Battle of Port Arthur
