= Omer Yusuf =

- ユセフ・オマー
- Born: 23 May 1931; Toyohara, Japan
- Died: 18 October 2013 (aged 82); Tokyo, Japan
- Occupations: Actor, wrestler

Omer Yusuf (Japanese: ユセフ・オマー; May 23, 1931 - October 18, 2013) was a Japanese actor and wrestler of Tatar descent. He was a young brother of Osman Yusuf, who was also an actor.

== Biography ==
Omer Yusuf was born on May 23, 1931, in Toyohara (now Yuzhno-Sakhalinsk in Russian Federation). His parents were a Tatar emigrants who emigrated from Russia after the October Revolution. Later they moved with Osman Yusuf to Japan.

Omer Yusuf knew native language worse than his brother, but he was good in Japanese language.

He was passionate about sports, particularly wrestling, from judo to wrestling. He and his brother appeared in Japanese films, playing Europeans and Americans. In 1954 he debuted as a professional wrestler. He actively competed as a referee and became known to the public for his comical wrestling style and charismatic approach, despite possessing incredible physical strength and endurance. However, due to internal conflicts, he left the organization and withdrew from the industry for several years, focusing on real estate and corporations in Hawaii, security, and stockholder meetings, which led to connections with major entrepreneurs and shadowy organizations.

Only 30 years later did he return to wrestling as a manager and referee, working with Abdullah the Butcher, collaborating with producer Kajiwara Ikki, and participating in the Japan Muslim Association. In the end of 1980s he played a key role in Antonio Inoki's diplomatic operation, specifically using his personal connections to organize a chartered plane to evacuate Japanese citizens from Iraq during the Gulf War. In the end of 1990s he occasionally acted in films, performed comedy, and managed a hotel in Tochigi Prefecture.

Despite his age, Omer Yusuf continued to compete in wrestling until his 80th birthday, occasionally refereeing matches for Real Japan Pro-Wrestling and giving influential interviews where he emphasized his strength and charisma. In recent years, he attempted to unite Japanese wrestling organizations, although the project never came to fruition.

He died from heart complications at the age of 83 on October 18, 2013.

== Filmography ==
- 1954: Rikidozan no tetsuwan kyojin
- 1957: Umi no Yarōdomo
- 1959: Uta Abe
- 1959: Tōkaidō yajikita chin dōchū
- 1960: Maboroshi Tantei: Yûreitô no Daima Jutsudan — Rod Tiger
- 1960: Ore no furusato wa dai seibu
- 1961: Watashi wa uso wa mōshimasen
- 1961: Zokuzoku bantōhan to detchidon
- 1977: Nihon no Don: Yabô-hen
- 1979: Shokei yûgi
