= Hilmi Şenalp =

Turkish architect

Muharrem Hilmi Şenalp
- Born: 1957 (age 68–69); Konya, Turkey
- Education: Istanbul Technical University; Yıldız Technical University
- Occupation: Architect

Muharrem Hilmi Şenalp (born 1957 in Konya, Turkey) is a Turkish architect. His work is often inspired by Ottoman architecture. He has been called Turkish president Recep Tayyip Erdoğan's "court architect", and is a close friend of the president. His company, Hassa Architecture, specializes in neo-Ottoman style. Şenalp takes inspiration from 16th century architect Mimar Sinan, who worked for Suleiman the Magnificent.

== Early life and education ==
He attended high school in Konya, and graduated from the Istanbul Technical University in 1981.

== Works ==
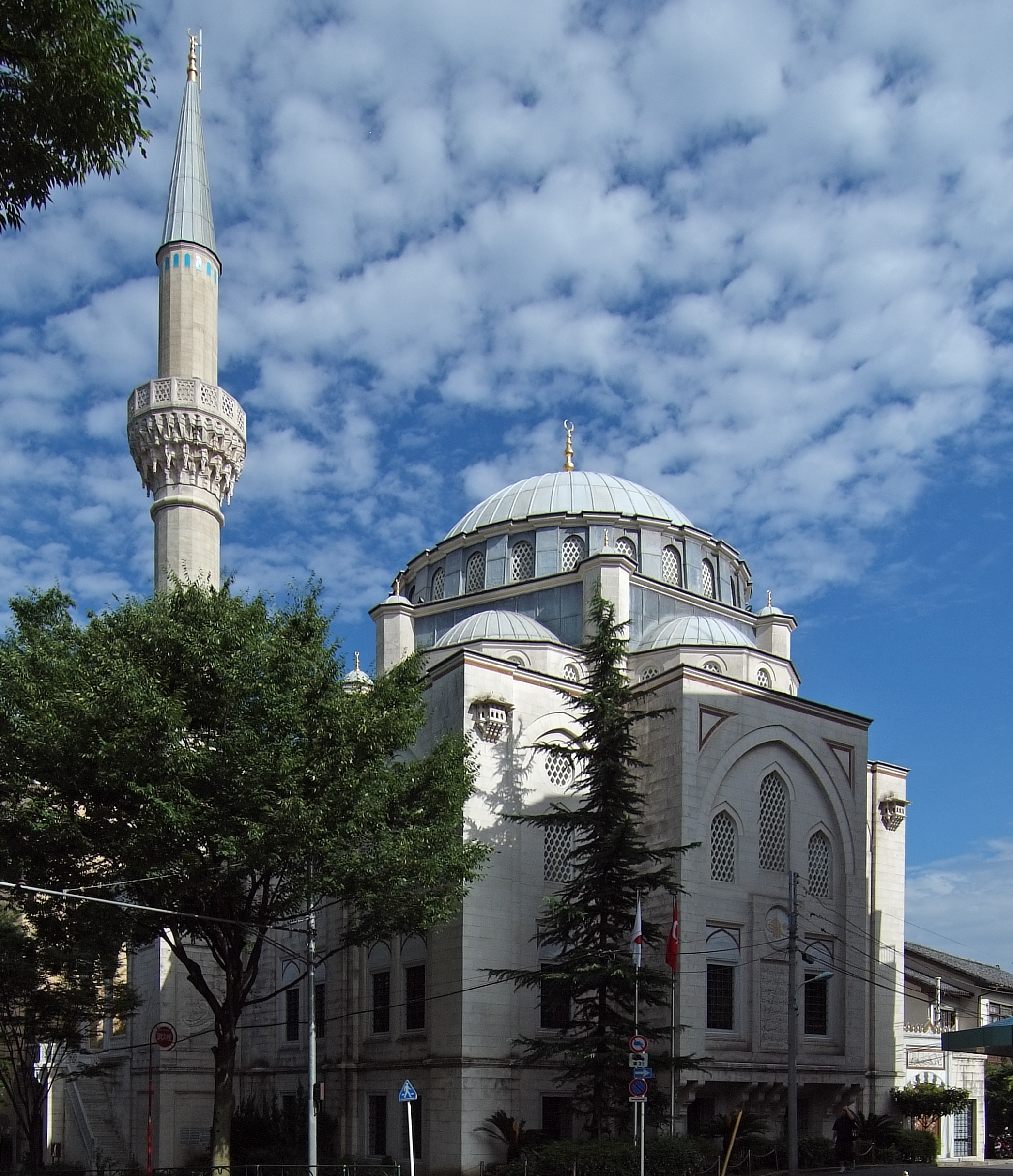
Tokyo Mosque

His work include the new Tokyo Mosque in Japan, the Ertuğrul Gazi Mosque in Turkmenistan, the Şehitlik Mosque in Berlin, and the Diyanet Center of America in Maryland, U.S.

Kishwar Rizvi, professor of Islamic art, says "Hilmi Şenalp's mosques are a signature of Turkish identity, exported through the diaspora as reminders of the home nation, and built in foreign lands as diplomatic gifts of brotherhood." She states that the mosques, sponsored by the Turkish government, seems to equate ethnicity with religious identity, and compares him with Vedat Dalokay, who designed the Faisal Mosque in Islamabad. Şenalp says "The mosque is the heart of our civilization, Turkish-Islamic civilization." A SETA Foundation publication says "Beyond doubt, the architectural designs of Şenalp, whether traditional or contemporary, is a deliberate manifestation of a quest for identity of its architect and of its sponsors. This approach reinterprets the traditional forms in such a way that it is related to the past, history and memory."

Other projects include the Mimar Sinan Mosque in Ataşehir, Istanbul, one of Erdoğan's residences and a monument commemorating victims of the 2016 Turkish coup d'état attempt.
