= Mimar Sinan Mosque =

Mosque in Ataşehir, Istanbul, Turkey

- Mimar Sinan Camii
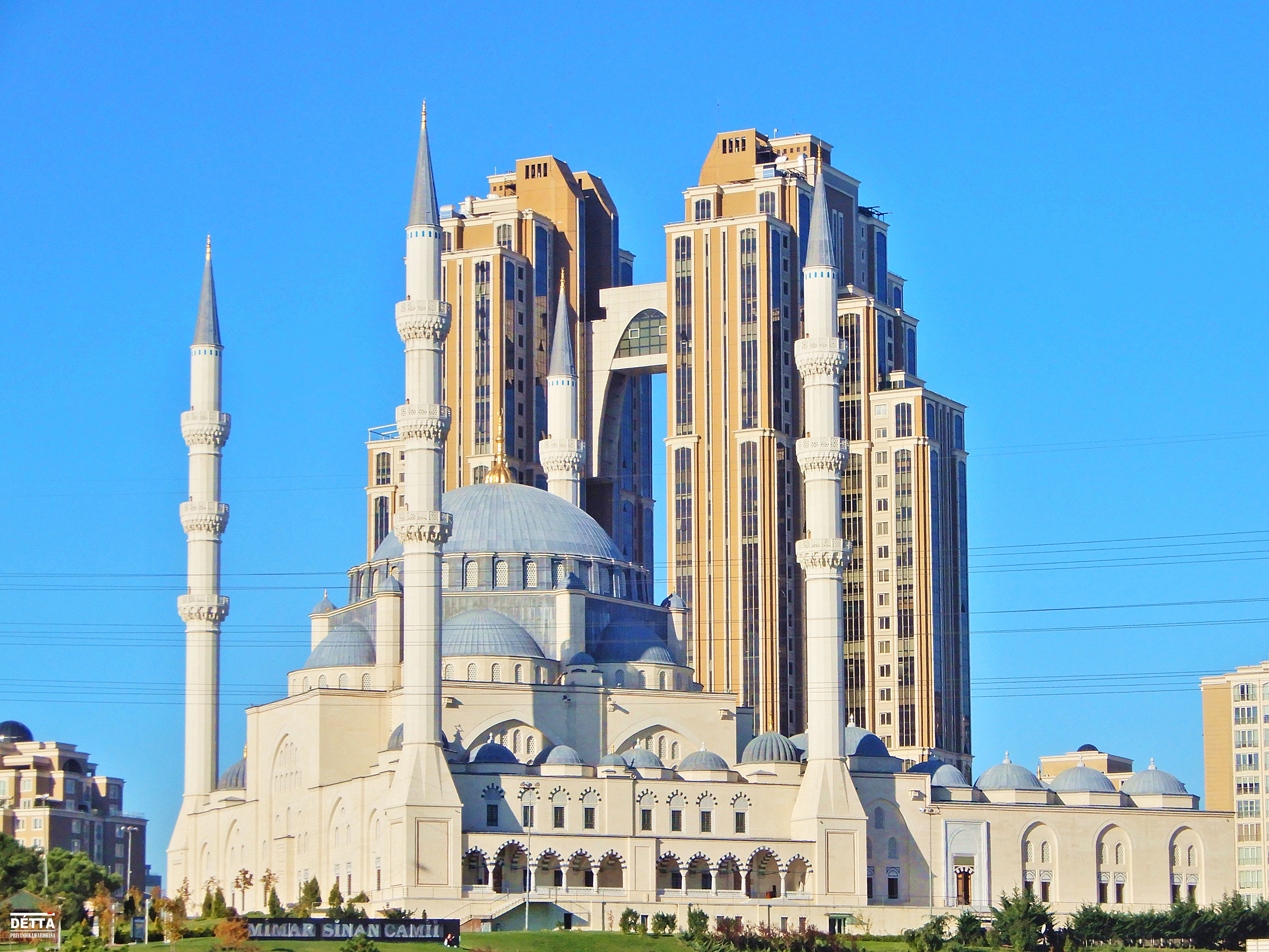

- Location within Istanbul

Religion
- Affiliation: Islam

Location
- Municipality: Ataşehir, Istanbul
- Country: Turkey
- Interactive map of Mimar Sinan Mosque
- Coordinates: 40.99576717798203°N 29.112327793519125°E

Architecture
- Architect: Hilmi Şenalp
- Type: mosque

The Mimar Sinan Mosque (Turkish: Mimar Sinan Camii) is a mosque in the Ataşehir district of Istanbul, Turkey. It was inaugurated in 2012.

The mosque was commissioned by the Turkish government and designed by architect Hilmi Şenalp. Originally intended to be named the "Anatolian Great Mosque", then prime-minister Recep Tayyip Erdoğan had the name changed to honor Mimar Sinan (16th century), a famous Ottoman architect. Erdoğan stated at the inauguration that the Anatolian side of Istanbul had lacked a "selatin" (literally "sultans", imperial) mosque like the Mimar Sinan Mosque. At the event, Erdoğan gave visiting dignitaries a miniature replica of the mosque, mimicking a ritual of the Ottoman sultans.

The mosque has a capacity of 10,000-12,500 people. The central dome is 42 meters high, and the minarets 72 meters. The complex has a large underground area, which includes a library, classrooms, conference halls, shops, garage and VIP lounge.

== See also ==
- Süleymaniye Mosque, 16th century mosque designed by Mimar Sinan
- Mimar-Sinan-Moschee Lauda, German mosque, opened 1990
- Çamlıca Mosque, the largest mosque of Istanbul and Turkey
