= Şehitlik Mosque =

Mosque in Neukölln, Berlin, Germany

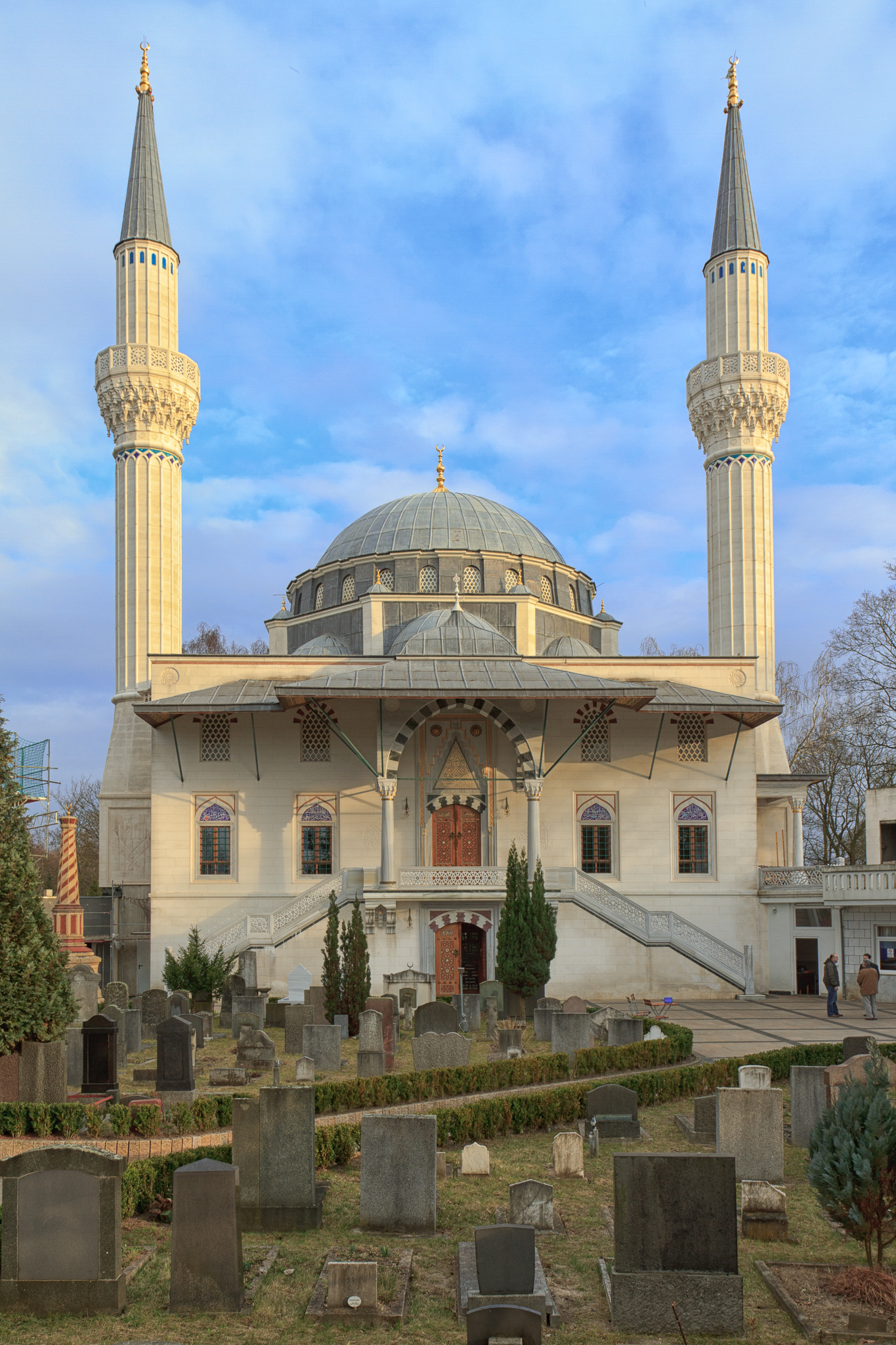
- The mosque in 2012

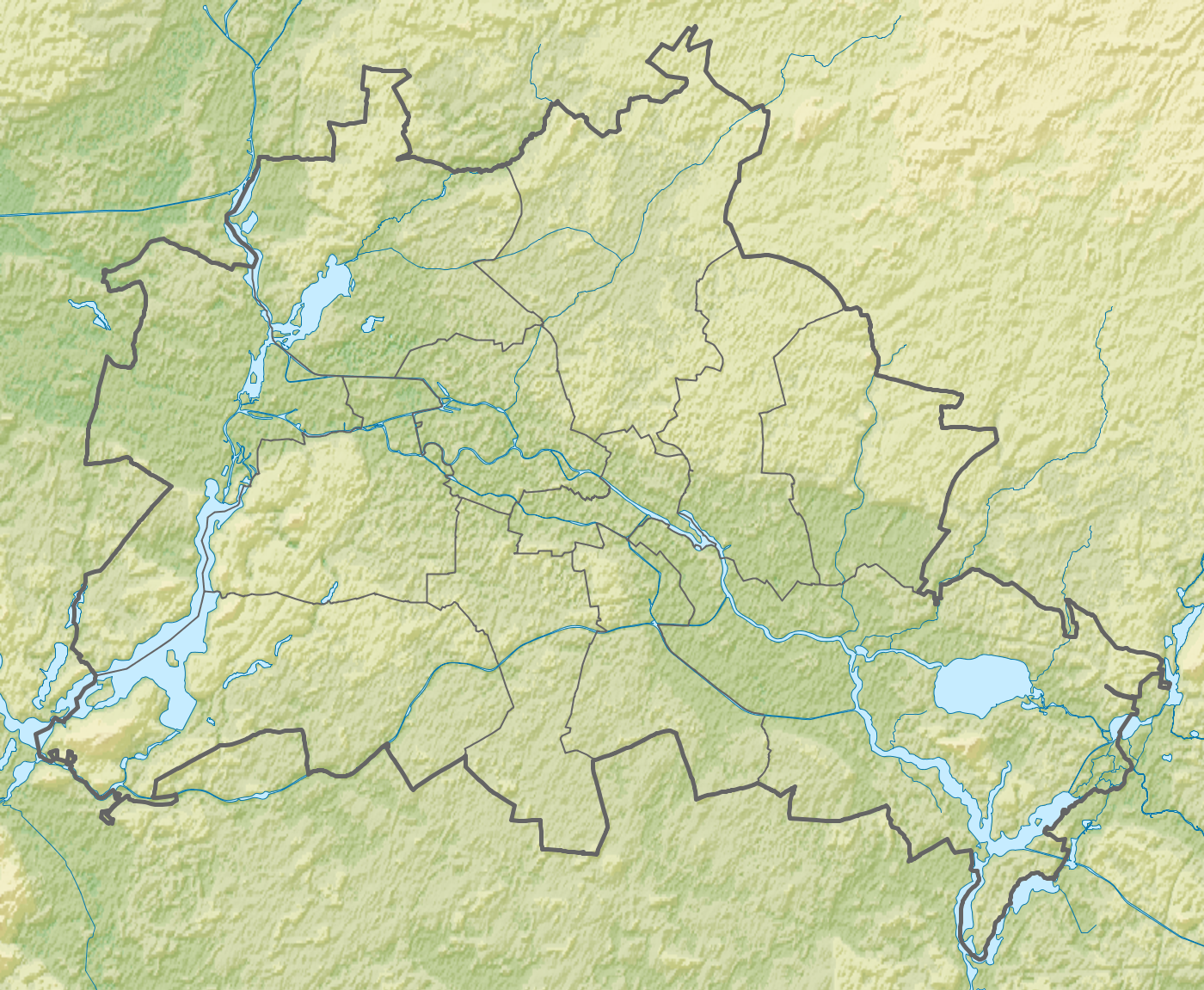
- Location of the mosque in Berlin

Religion
- Affiliation: Sunni Islam
- Ecclesiastical or organizational status: Mosque; Cultural center
- Ownership: Diyanet İşleri Türk İslam Birliği
- Status: Active

Location
- Location: Neukölln, Berlin
- Country: Germany
- Interactive map of Şehitlik Mosque
- Coordinates: 52°28′53″N 13°24′35″E

Architecture
- Architect: Hilmi Şenalp
- Type: Mosque
- Style: Ottoman Revival
- Groundbreaking: 1999
- Completed: 2005

Specifications
- Capacity: 1,500 worshipers
- Dome: 1
- Dome height (outer): 21.3 m (70 ft)
- Minaret: 2
- Minaret height: 37.1 m (122 ft)

Website
- sehitlik-camii.de

The Şehitlik Mosque is a mosque in Neukölln, Berlin, Germany. The Sunni mosque was completed in 2005, and is operated by the Diyanet İşleri Türk İslam Birliği (DİTİB).

Designed in an Ottoman Revival style by Hilmi Şenalp, the four storey mosque has capacity for 1,500 worshipers. The complex also includes a cultural center, and an information and meeting center.

The mosque took its name from the Turkish cemetery, which was laid out as a diplomatic cemetery back in 1866. Among the graves of honor there are those for the Armenian genocide perpetrators Cemal Azmi and Bahattin Şakir, which was criticized by Kurdish-German politician Giyasettin Sayan in 2005.

== Overview ==
The foundation stone for the building was laid in 1999, and the mosque was completed in 2005. Designed by Hilmi Şenalp, the mosque was modeled on Ottoman architecture from the 16th and 17th centuries, in a modern revival style. The mosques has two minarets that are 37.1 metres (122 ft) tall, and a main dome that is 21.3 metres (70 ft) high.

The mosque was also the target of four arson attacks in 2010. In 2011, the perpetrator was arrested and sentenced to two years and nine months in prison.

== Gallery ==
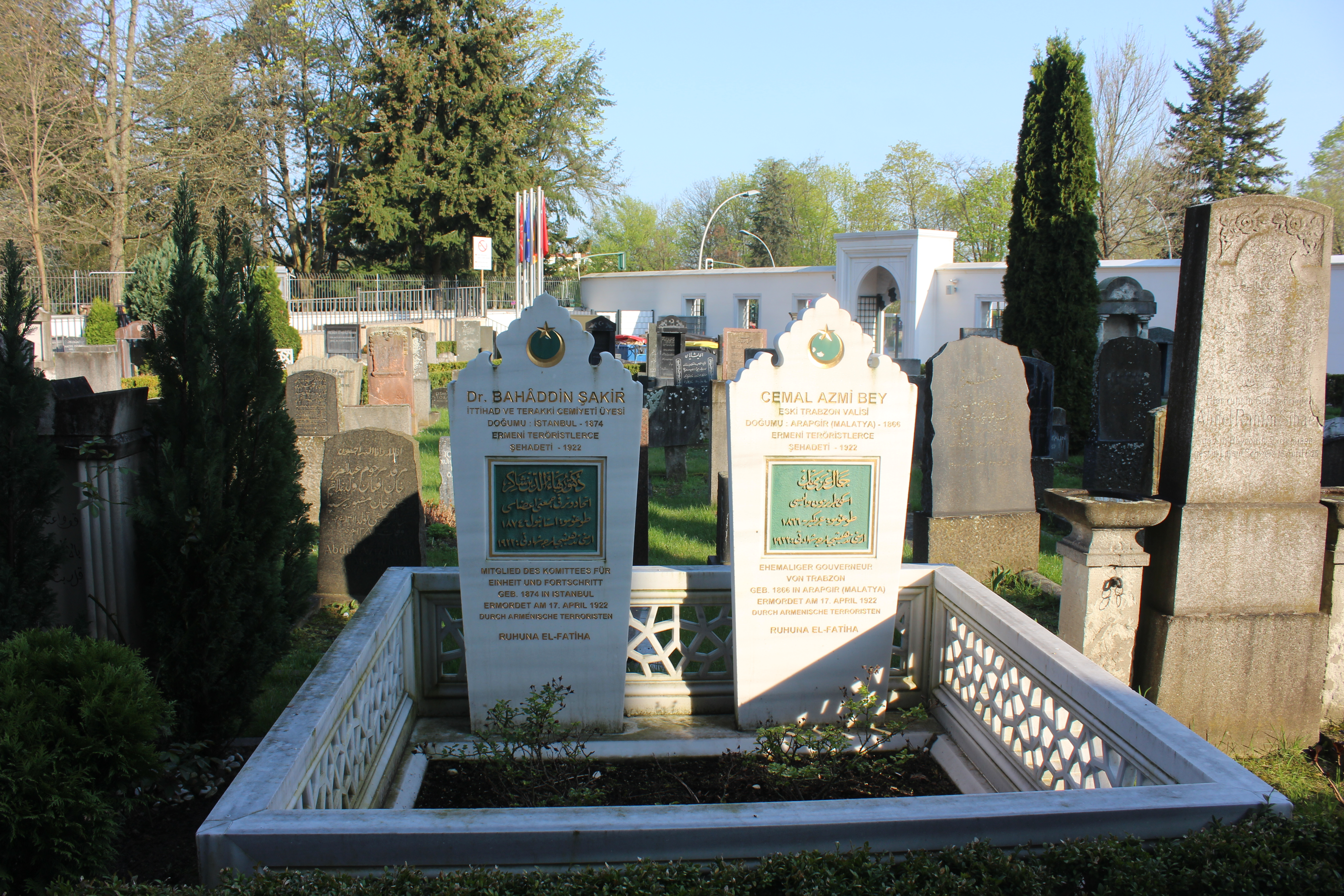
Graves of Cemal Azmi and Bahattin Şakir in the cemetery

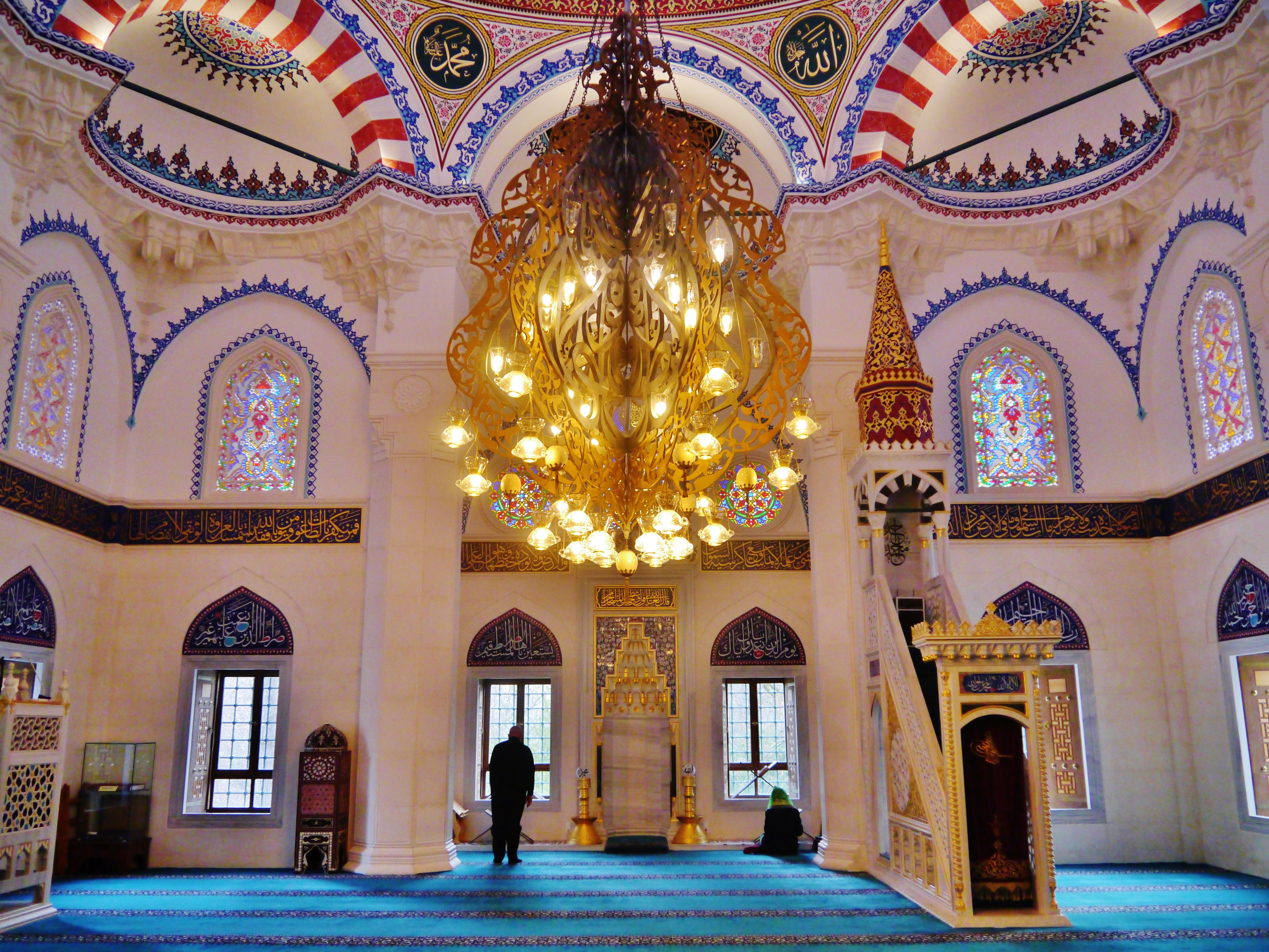
Interior of the mosque showing the mihrab and minbar

== See also ==
- Islam in Germany
- List of mosques in Germany
- DITB mosques
