= Sanshiro Sugata Part II =

1945 Japanese action drama film by Akira Kurosawa

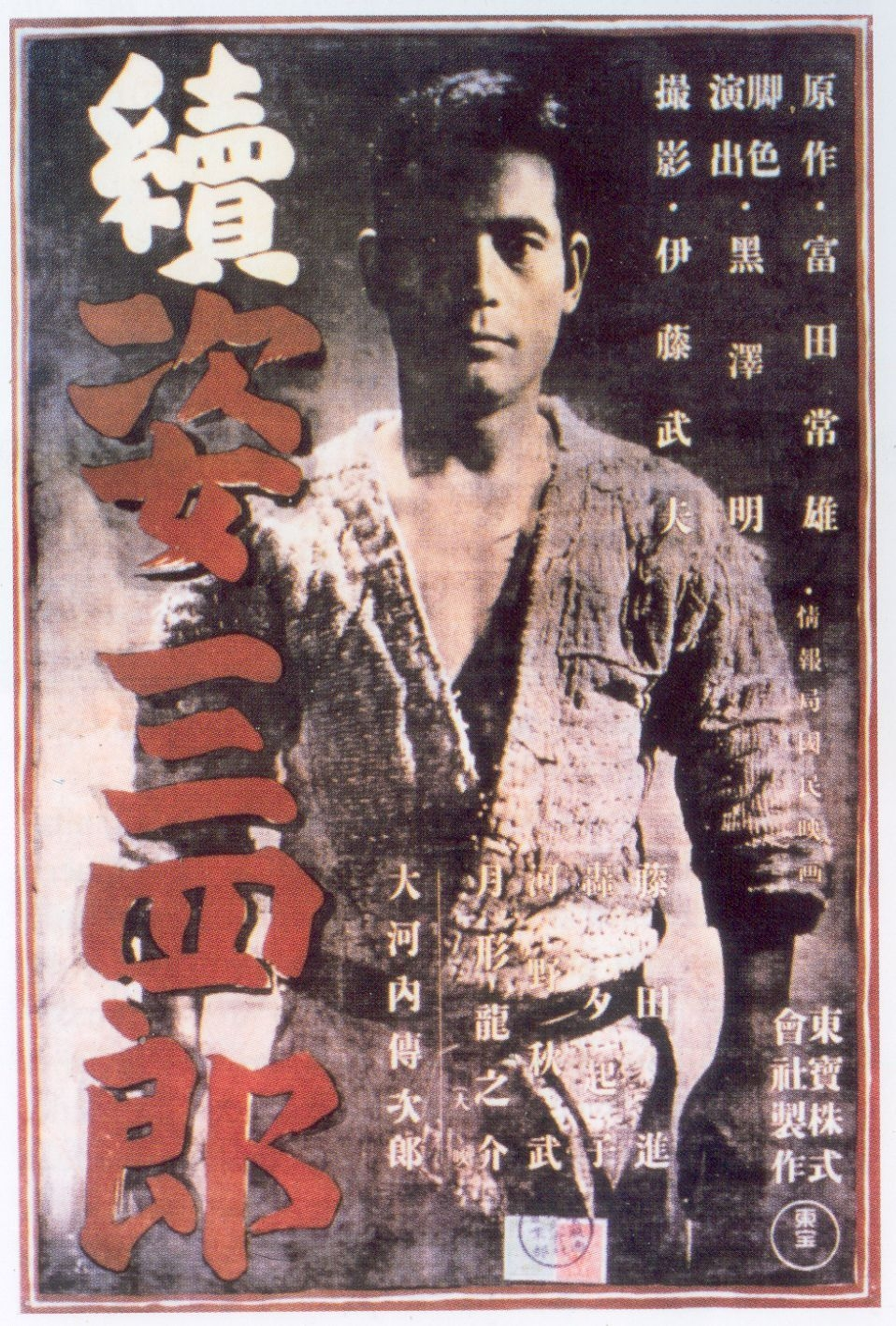
- Theatrical release poster
- Directed by: Akira Kurosawa
- Screenplay by: Akira Kurosawa
- Based on: Sanshiro Sugata by Tsuneo Tomita
- Produced by: Motohiko Itō
- Starring: Susumu Fujita; Denjirō Ōkōchi; Kokuten Kōdō; Ryūnosuke Tsukigata
- Edited by: Yoshie Yaguchi
- Music by: Seiichi Suzuki
- Production company: Toho
- Distributed by: Toho
- Release date: May 3, 1945 (Japan)
- Running time: 83 minutes
- Country: Japan
- Language: Japanese

Sanshiro Sugata Part II (Japanese: 續姿三四郎, Hepburn: Zoku Sugata Sanshirō; a.k.a. Judo Saga II) is a 1945 Japanese martial arts action drama film written and directed by Akira Kurosawa.

The film is based on the novel by Tsuneo Tomita, son of Tomita Tsunejirō, the earliest disciple of judo. It was filmed in early 1945 in Japan towards the end of World War II. Unlike the original Sugata Sanshiro, the sequel is in part considered a propaganda film.

The film is believed by some to be the earliest known film sequel whose title is simply the original title followed by a number, predating Quatermass 2 (1957), although the added kanji 續 (Zoku) is not a numeral but simply means "Continuation" or "Sequel" in the style of Another Thin Man or The Invisible Man Returns.

== Plot ==
In the 1880s, a martial arts student continues his quest to become a judo master, from that discipline's founder. Eventually, he learns enough to demonstrate his skill in a boxing match between American and Japanese fighters at the end of the movie. The whole movie is actually about the rivalry between karate and judo martial artists, and Sanshiro's struggle to do what is right. On one side there is the morally right thing to do, and on the other the rules in the dojo. Eventually he decides to break all of the rules, leave the dojo, fight the American boxer and, also, the karate masters. He wins both fights and at the end of the movie smiles while washing his face, finally able to sleep and be happy.

== Cast ==
- Denjirō Ōkōchi - Shogoro Yano
- Susumu Fujita - Sanshiro Sugata
- Ryūnosuke Tsukigata - Gennosuke Higaki
- Akitake Kōno - Genzaburo Higaki
- Yukiko Todoroki - Sayo
- Soji Kiyokawa - Yujiro Toda
- Masayuki Mori - Yoshima Dan
- Seiji Miyaguchi - Kohei Tsuzaki
- Ko Ishida - Daisuburo Hidarimonji
- Kazu Hikari - Kihei Sekine
- Kokuten Kōdō - Buddhist Priest Saiduchi
- Ichiro Sugai - Yoshizo Fubuki
- Osman Yusuf - American Sailor
- Roy James - William Lister

== Critical reviews ==
In his review of the original Sanshiro Sugata for Bright Lights Film Journal, Brian Libby noted that the film is "less propaganda-oriented" than its sequel. In the original film, "fighting is but a vehicle for a larger spiritual quest" whereas the sequel "promotes Japanese judo's superiority to Western boxing", setting a different tone. Christian Blauvelt, writing a review for Slant Magazine, agreed that the film is somewhat tainted by noticeable propaganda. Sanshiro's victory against the American boxer "is taken as a sign of Japanese physical, moral, and spiritual superiority". He also noted that "Sanshiro comes to the aid of defenseless Japanese who are being beaten up by a drunken American sailor". Historian David Conrad has contextualized the film as a "crude bit of wish-fulfillment" during the last weeks of World War II when Japan's leaders "moved the war's frontlines to the only place it could still be won: the realm of fantasy."

Christian Blauvelt however saw merit in the film as illustrated in the battle against the brothers of Gennosuke Higaki, the original film's villain: "Their battle takes place on a snow-covered hillside and matches the natural beauty of the first film's windstorm finale. In his years apprenticing at P.C.L. [Photo Chemical Laboratories, which later became Toho], Kurosawa had become exposed to the films of John Ford, many of which played in Japan, before the foreign-film embargo that accompanied Japan's declaration of war on the United States in 1941. Like Ford, Kurosawa would emphasize the place of landscape in his films, often pairing his characters' emotional turmoil with the Elements. The rain in One Wonderful Sunday, Rashomon, or Seven Samurai, the beating sun in Stray Dog, the sinkhole in Drunken Angel, the snowfall in The Idiot, the wind in Dersu Uzala, and the crashing waves of Kagemusha would express some emotional anguish of the characters and, as a kind of cinematic synecdoche, society as a whole."

== Home media ==
The Criterion Collection has released Sanshiro Sugata II on DVD in North America as part of two Kurosawa-centered box sets; 2009's AK 100: 25 Films by Akira Kurosawa, and 2010's The First Films of Akira Kurosawa, the 23rd entry in their Eclipse series.
