= Tokyo Mosque =

Mosque in Shibuya, Tokyo, Japan

- 東京ジャーミイ
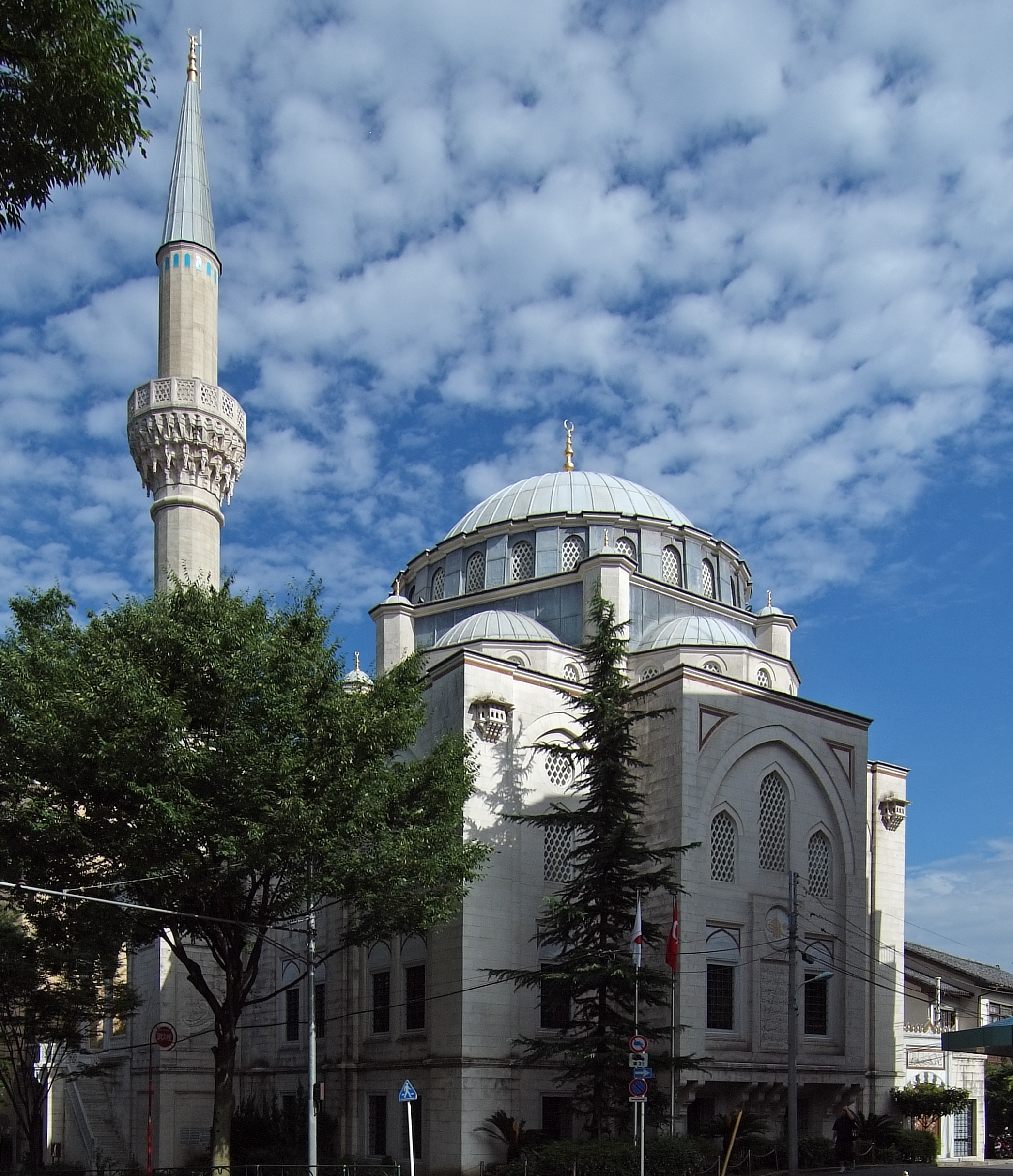

- Location of the mosque in Tokyo

Religion
- Affiliation: Sunni Islam
- Ecclesiastical or organisational status: Mosque
- Leadership: İmam Hatibi Muhammet Rıfat Çınar
- Status: Active

Location
- Location: Shibuya, Tokyo
- Country: Japan
- Interactive map of Tokyo Mosque
- Coordinates: 35°40′05″N 139°40′35″E

Architecture
- Architect: Muharrem Hilmi Senalp
- Style: Ottoman
- Groundbreaking: 1998
- Completed: 1938 (first structure); 2000 (current structure)
- Construction cost: 1.5 billion yen (2000)

Specifications
- Interior area: 1,477 m^{2} (15,900 sq ft)
- Dome: 1
- Dome height (outer): 23.25 m (76.3 ft)
- Minaret: 1
- Minaret height: 41.48 m (136.1 ft)
- Site area: 734 m^{2} (7,900 sq ft)

Website
- tokyocamii.org

The Tokyo Mosque (Japanese: 東京ジャーミイ, romanized: Tōkyō-jāmii), also known as Tokyo Camii (pronounced "jamii" in Turkish), is a mosque with an adjoining Turkish culture center located in the Ōyama-chō district of Shibuya ward in Tokyo, Japan. It is the largest mosque in Japan.

Originally built in 1938, the current building was completed in 2000. It was designed by Hilmi Şenalp, in an Ottoman style.

== History ==
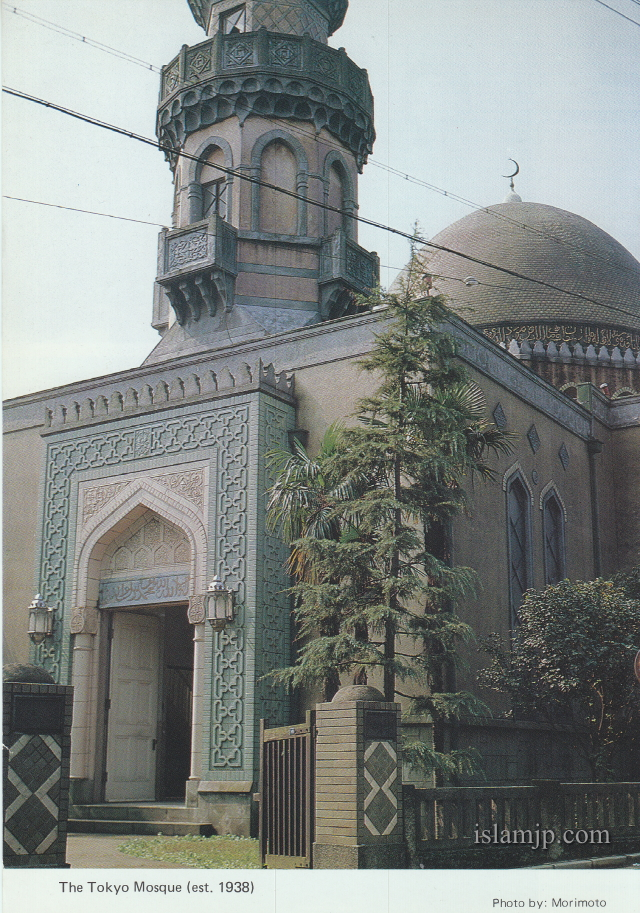
The old Tokyo Mosque, demolished in 1986

The mosque was originally built along with an adjoining school on May 12, 1938, by Bashkir and Tatar immigrants from Russia who had come to Japan after the October Revolution. It was made under the direction of Abdurreshid Ibrahim, the first Imam of the mosque, and Abdülhay Kurban Ali. In 1986, the mosque was demolished due to severe structural damage.

Under the direction and support of Turkey's Directorate of Religious Affairs, a new building was begun in 1998. The architect for the building was Hilmi Şenalp. The ornamentation was based on the Ottoman style. Around 70 Turkish craftsmen performed the finishing details, and a considerable quantity of marble was imported from Turkey. The construction was completed in 2000 at a cost of c. 1.5 billion yen. The inauguration was held on June 30, 2000.

== Description ==
The Tokyo Mosque is 734 square metres (7,900 sq ft) in area and has one basement floor and three above-ground floors with a total floor area of 1,477 square metres (15,900 sq ft). Its main dome is 23.25 metres (76.3 ft) tall and is supported by six pillars, while the adjacent minaret is 41.48 metres (136.1 ft) tall.

Each floor of the building houses a different activity for worshipers at that mosque. The first floor is a common area, the second floor is the prayer room, housing the mihrab, and a minbar, elevated steps for the imam to deliver the sermon.

=== Color depicted in Ottoman mosques ===
All throughout the interior and exterior of the Tokyo Mosque the colors white, and turquoise are heavily used. Since this mosque is modeled after Ottoman architecture the colors that are utilized are reflected throughout this structure and the use of the colors implemented are reciprocated as well. The color turquoise is a color that is regarded to be a representation of holiness, a color depicted as early as ancient Iran. The minbar and mihrab are both covered in white marble, a color that most known to represent purity in relation to God and pure light, while the gold detailing on both of the functional ornaments allows the pieces to further stand out in the mosque.

This structure also heavily resembles another mosque created under the same Ottoman architecture style, the Blue Mosque. Color within these mosques are highlighted through their use of natural and artificial lighting, natural via the many windows that encompass the mosque and artificial via the low hanging chandeliers. The connection between the use of light and color to an audience is known and utilized throughout the creation of mosques, as the architects try and incorporate enough of each to create an impact on the viewer of the building.

== Imams ==
Tokyo Mosque (1935-1983)
Name	Tenure	ref
Abdulhay Kurban Ali	1935-38	
Abdurreşit İbrahim	1938-43	
Turkistanlı Emin İslami	1943-50	
Sherifullah Miftahuddin	1950-69	
Aynan Safa	1969-79	
Hussein Baş	1979-83	

== Gallery ==
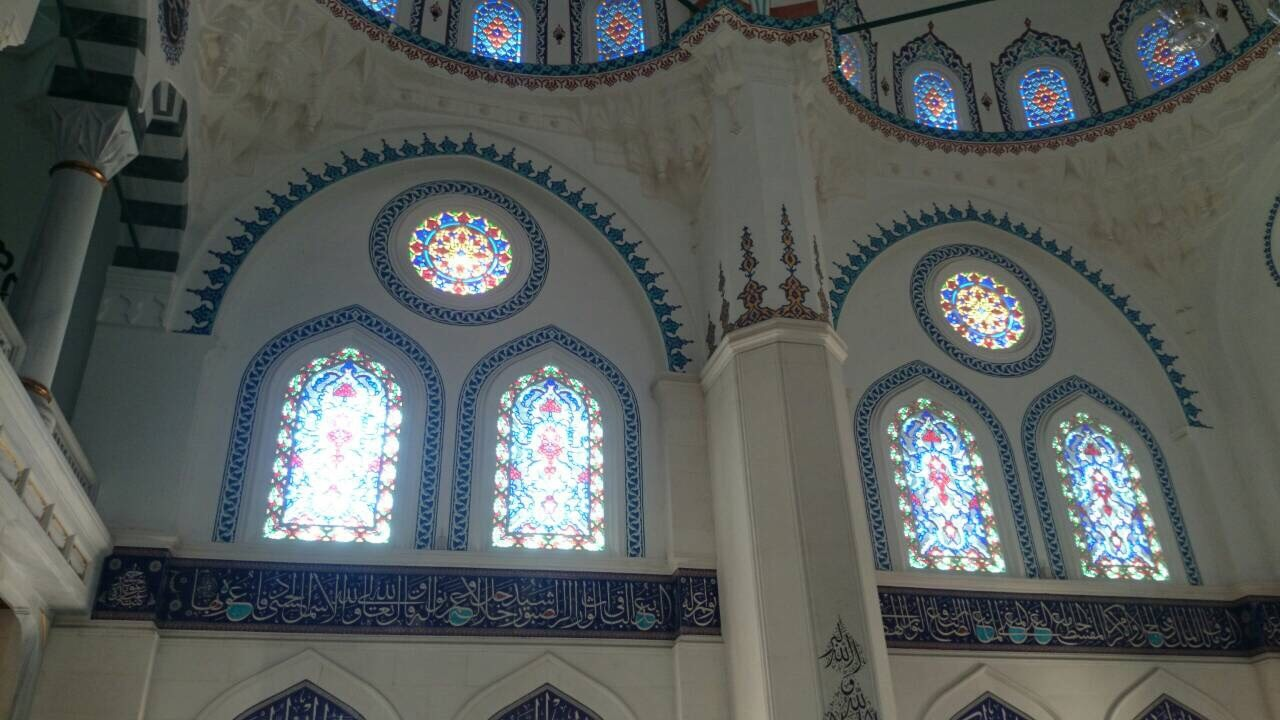
Tokyo Camii stained glass from the inside

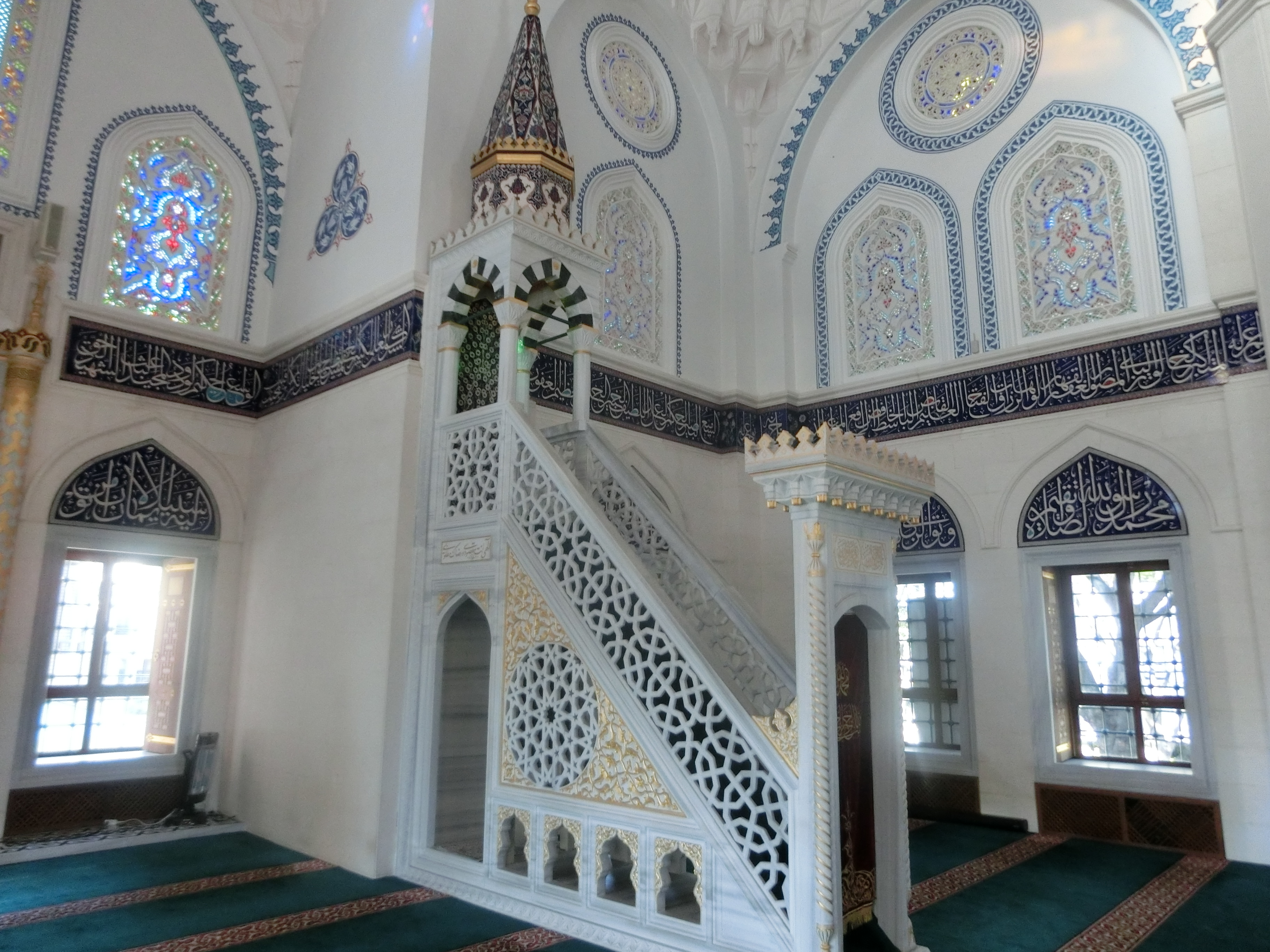
Interior looking towards the minbar

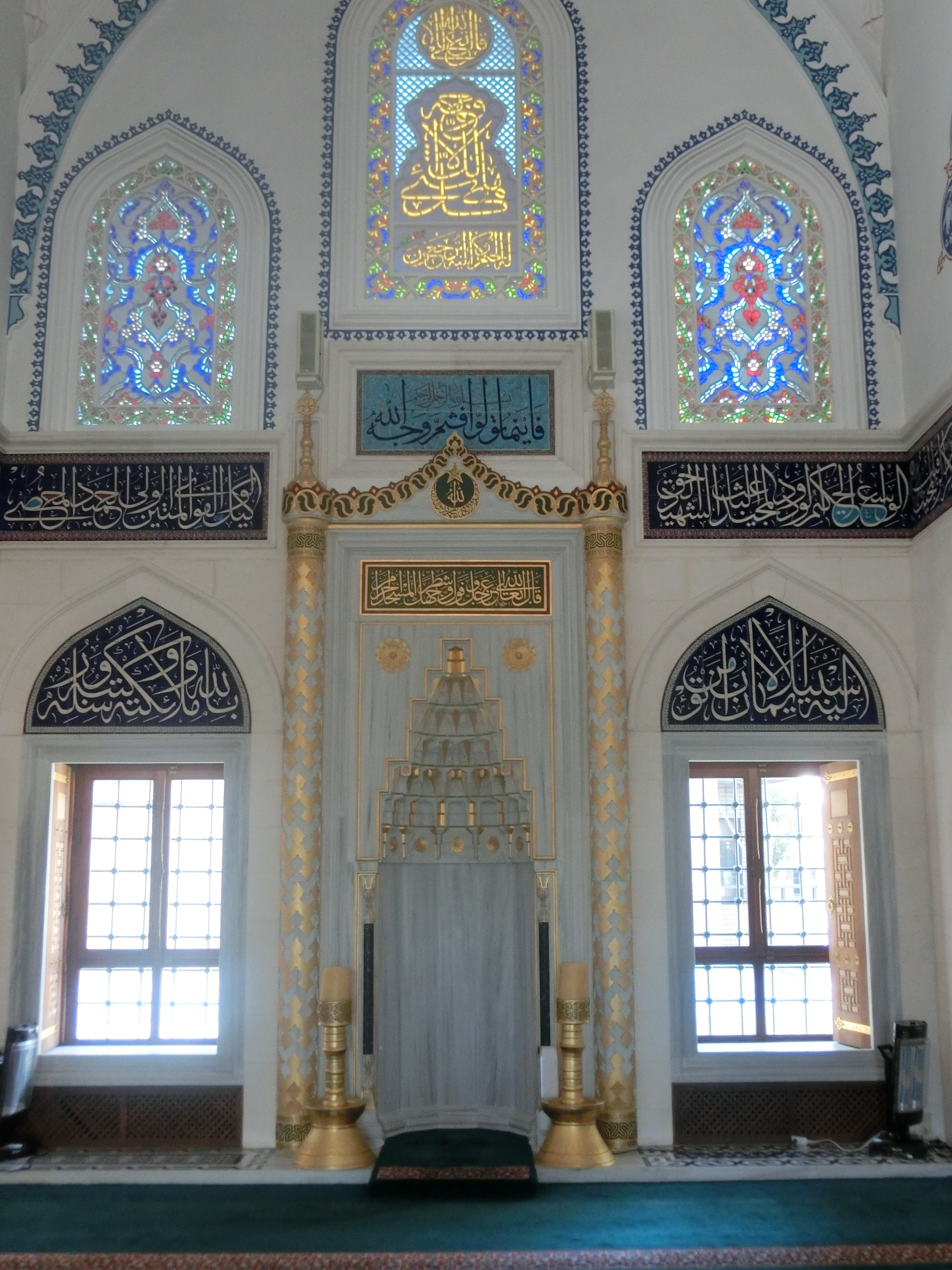
Interior showcasing the mihrab

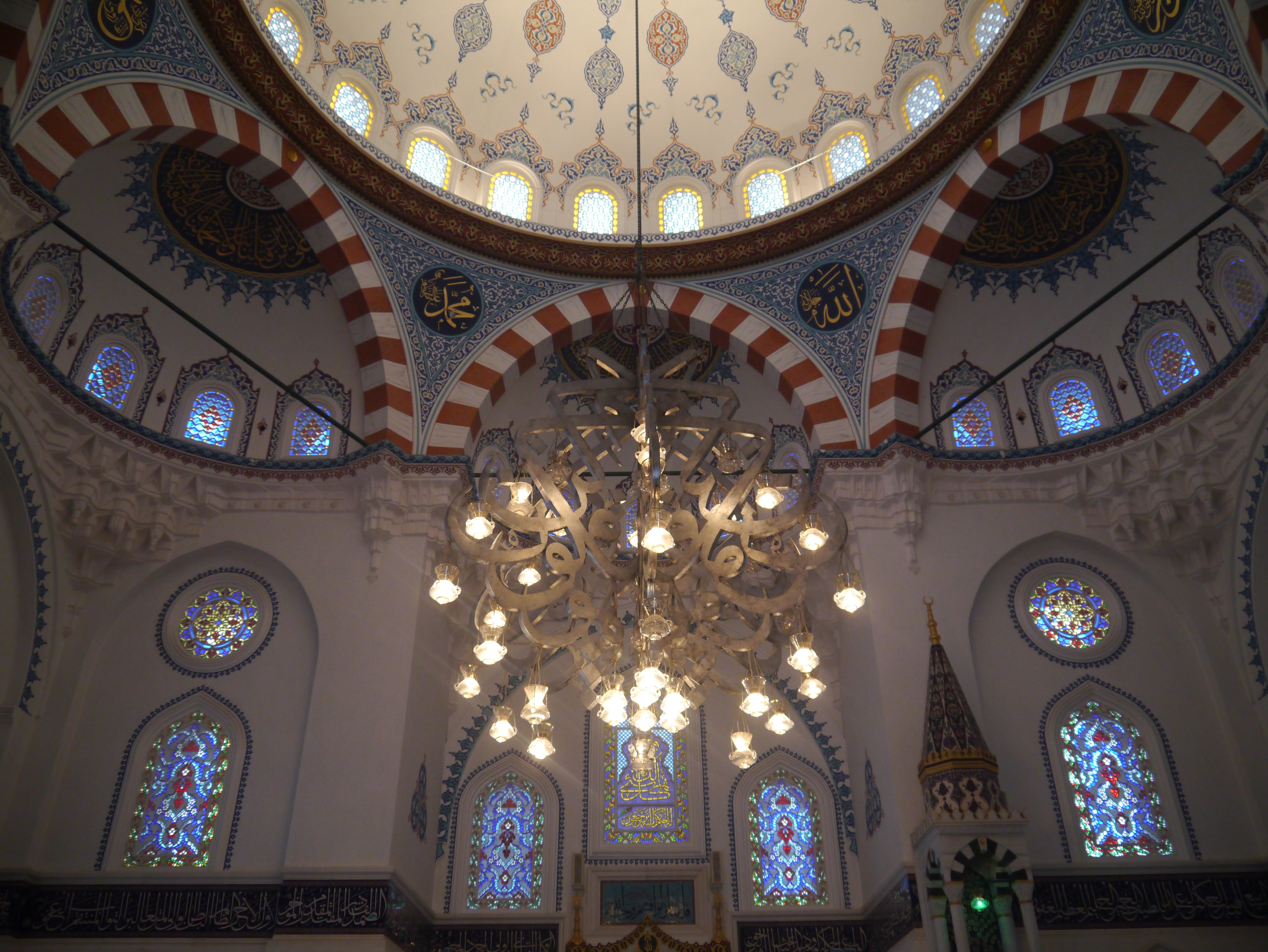
Quranic calligraphy shown on the pendentives.

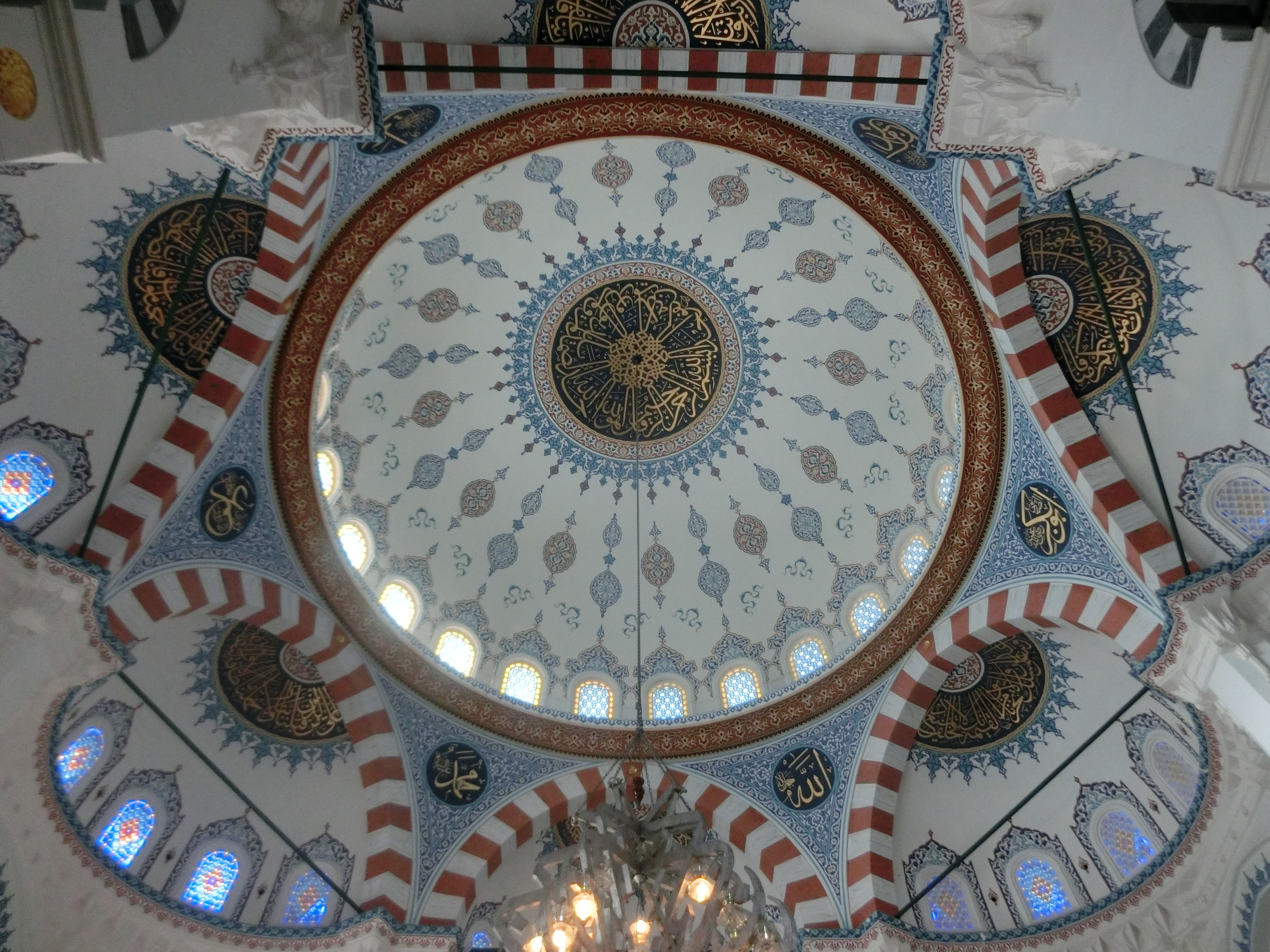
Details on the dome interior

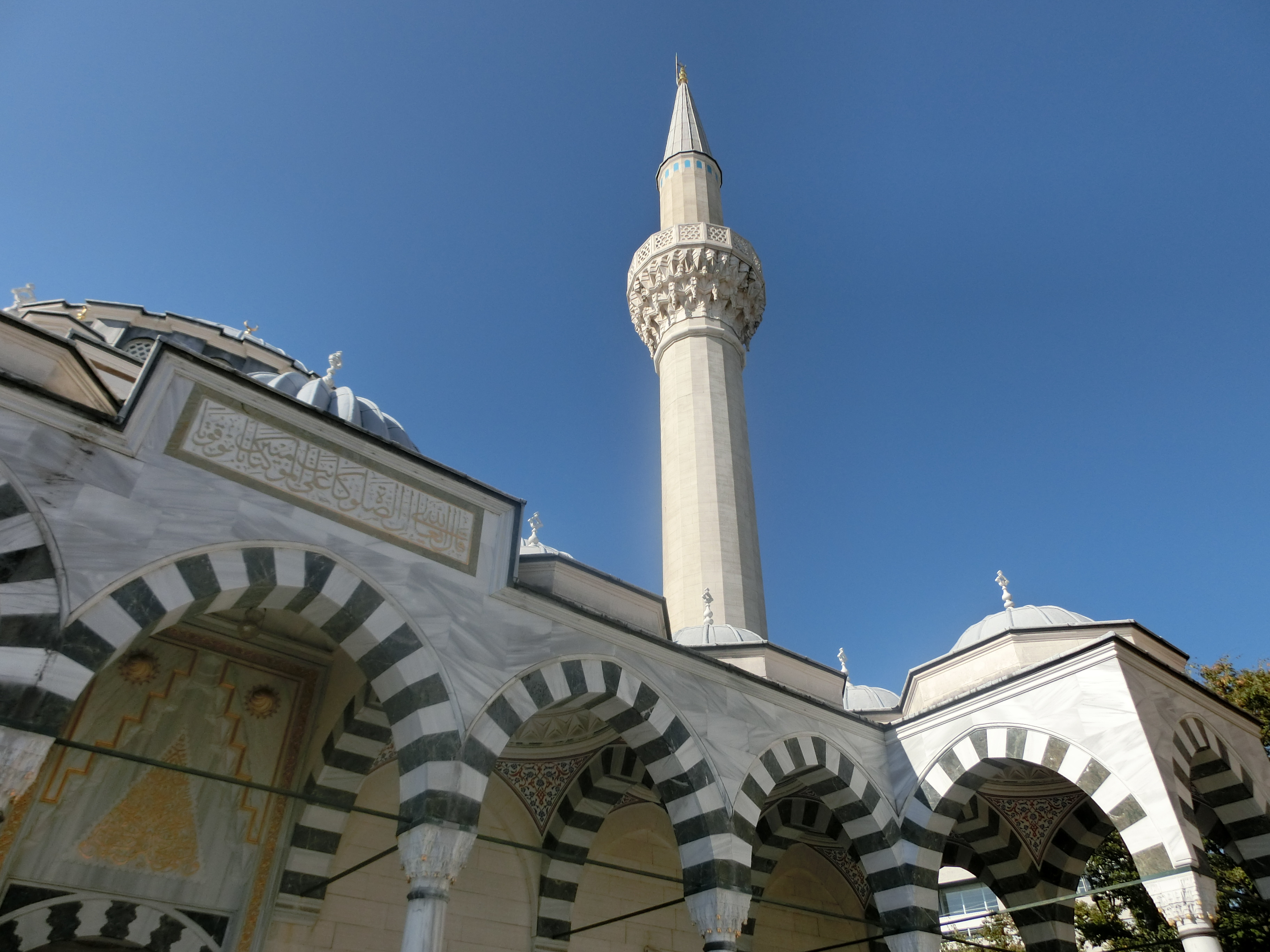
The minaret

== See also ==
- Islam in Japan
- List of mosques in Japan
