= Gabdulla Safa =

- Born: 9 March 1929; Tokyo, Japan
- Died: 29 December 1982; Tokyo, Japan
- Occupation: Actor
- Years active: 1945–1982

Gabdulla Safa, also known as a Roy James (Tatar: Габделхәннан Сафа, March 9, 1929, Tokyo – December 29, 1982), was a Japanese actor of Tatar descent.

== Biography ==
He was born on March 9, 1929, in a poor neighborhood of Tokyo. His father, Gainan Safa, was an imam of the Muslim community who moved from Russia after the October Revolution along with other Islam leaders from the Volga-Ural region.

He lived in Turkey for a long time with his parents. Due to the family's dual citizenship, in February 1945, when Turkey declared war on Germany and Japan at the end of World War II, Gabdulla was arrested and sent to hard labor until the surrender of the Japanese Empire. After his release, he attended Meiji University, where, in addition to his studies, he participated in sports, first baseball for the university baseball club, and then juken (mixed martial arts, including judo and boxing), competing under the stage name «Straight Roy».

Besides his studies and sports, he also devoted himself to film. His acting debut came in 1945 in Akira Kurosawa's Sanshiro Sugata Part II (1945), where he played the American boxer William Lister. At the time, white actors were rare in Japanese cinema, despite collaboration with Nazi Germany. Thus, Gabdulla Safa became one of the first foreigners to appear in Japanese movies. In 1953, he performed at the Nichigeki Musical Theater.

In 1955 he played an American soldier in director Mikio Naruse's film Floating Clouds (1955), becoming active as a film actor and television host at the dawn of Japanese television. From then on, he actively participated in numerous television and radio programs, distinguished by his open and brash manner. He also created the pseudonym «Roy James» to make him easier for Japanese viewers to remember. He also appeared in the first Japanese commercials.

Gabdulla's most notable roles were in the melodrama Hito Mo Arukeba (1960), which tells the story of a drummer's love for a money lender's daughter; the comedy Song of Youth (1959), where he played the film producer Nakai in a story about Japanese students who decide to star in a cheap film; the crime thriller The Money Dance (1964) alongside a young Shintaro Katsu, who later became famous for his role as Zatoichi in various movies; and the family comedy Yumi no Hawai de bon odori (1964), which explores generational conflicts.

Despite his active involvement in Japanese cinema, Gabdulla did not have full Japanese citizenship for a long time after the end of World War II, and only received it in 1971. In the spring of 1982, he stopped performing due to deteriorating health, and on December 29 of that year, he died of laryngeal cancer and complications from pneumonia at the age of 53. He was buried in the Muslim section of the Tama Cemetery.

== Filmography ==
- Zoku Sugata Sanshirō (1945) - William Lister
- Ukigumo (1955) - American soldier (as Roi H. Jêmusu)
- Oban kanketsu hen (1958) - Military Police
- Nippon romansu ryokô (1959) - Pinkerton
- Oku-sama Sanbagarasu (1959) - Robert Louis Stevenson
- Hito mo arukeba (1960) - Bub Kondô
- Utae wakôdo-tachi (1963) - Producer Nakai
- Yume no Hawaii de bon odori (1964) - Announcer
- Dokonjo monogatari - zeni no odori (1964) - 56 Horikawa
