= Muhammed-Gabdulkhay Kurbangaliev =

Bashkir religious leader, public and political figure (1889–1972)

- Мөхәмәтғәбделхәй Ғәбиҙулла улы Ҡорбанғәлиев
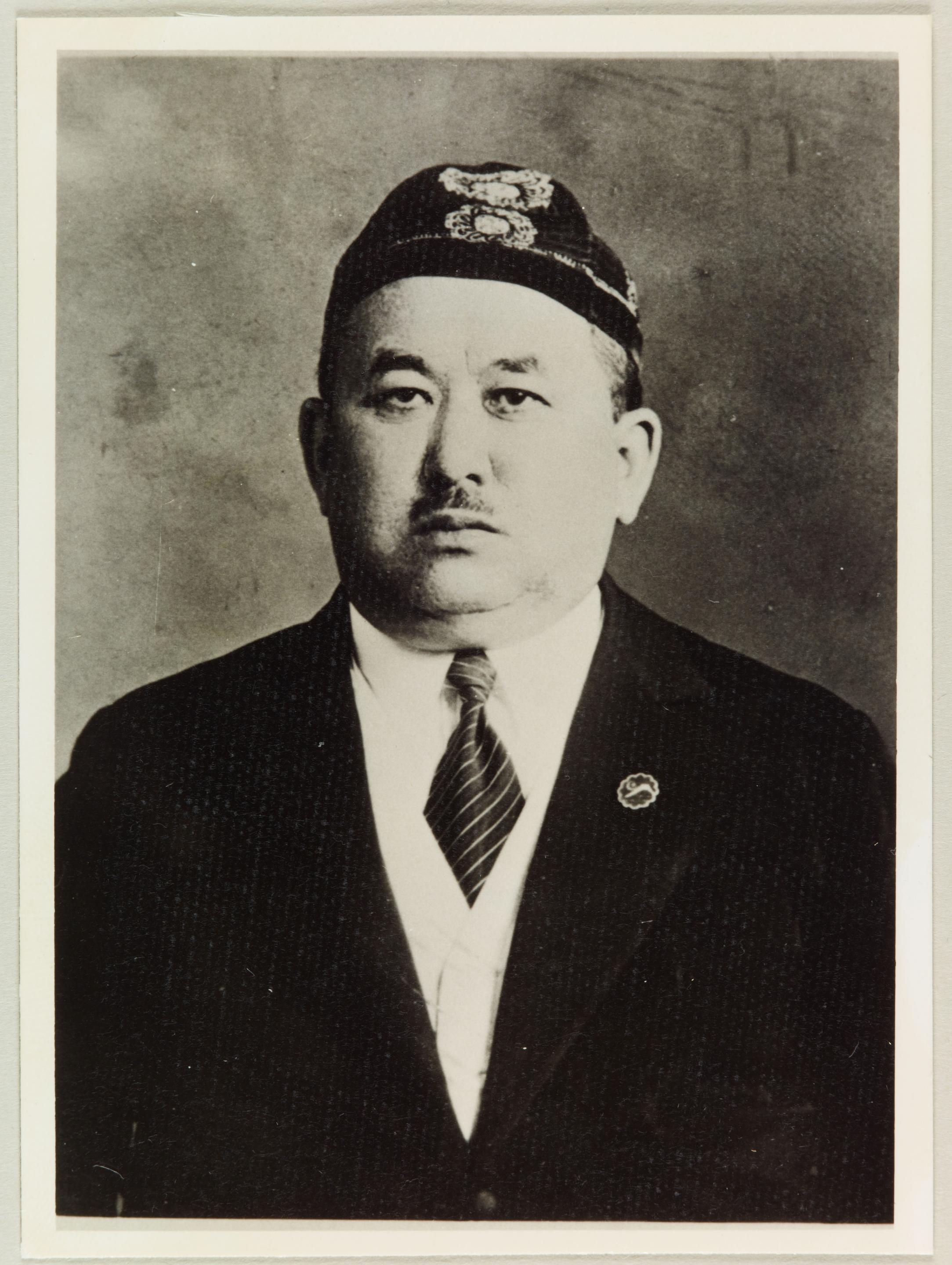
- Born: 1889; Mediak, Chelyabinsky Uyezd, Orenburg Governorate, Russian Empire
- Died: August 22, 1972 (aged 82–83); Chelyabinsk, Kazakh SSR, Soviet Union

Muhammed-Gabdulkhay Kurbangaliev (Russian: Мухамме́д-Габдулха́й Курбангали́ев, Bashkir: Мөхәмәтғәбделхәй Ҡорбанғәлиев, lit. 'Möxəmətğəbdelxəy Qorbanğəliyev', Japanese: ムハンマド・ガブドゥルハイ・クルバンガリー, 1889—1972) was a Bashkir religious leader, public and political figure in the early 20th century.

== Life ==
Born in 1889 in the village of Mediak in Chelyabinsk province, Orenburg Governorate (these days in the Argayashsky District, Chelyabinsk Oblast, Russia) to the family of the religious leader of a local Islamic community; his father Gabidulla Kurbangaliev was the local Imam khatib and a religious teacher who had a number of followers (Murids).

Received instruction in the local medrese founded by this father, then in the medrese Rasulia in Troitsk. Taught in the medrese in his home village. Embarked on a promising clerical career. In 1916, he was preparing to become Russia's head Mufti as Mukhammat-Safa Bayazitov’s successor (see Orenburg Muslim Spiritual Assembly). These plans were foiled by the Russian Revolution and the subsequent Civil War. In 1916, Muhammed Kurbangaliev took the post of the head of the Saint-Petersburg Muslim district.

=== Civil War ===
In 1917, Muhammed Kurbangaliev became active as a Bashkir public figure championing Bashkir community’s interests in the country undergoing dramatic political and social changes. Promoted the foundation of Argayash National Okrug, a Bashkir ethnic administration region in the north of the present-day Chelyabinsk Oblast. Participated in the 1st and 2nd All-Bashkir Congress (Kurultay) in July and August 1917. Advocated an autonomous spiritual administration for Bashkortostan’s Muslim community; opposed to nationalizing land in any format. Together with his father, acted as the main opponent of Zeki Velidi Togan in the Bashkir national and liberation movement. Disagreed with Velidi when the latter took the Soviet side to preserve the Bashkir autonomy, and in the name of all Bashkirs announced support for Aleksandr Kolchak’s administration.

Participated in the White movement, became one of the leader of Bashkir military units within Kolchak’s army.

In the summer of 1919, he attempted to arrange a new All-Bashkir Congress in the city of Chelyabinsk, then retreated eastward together with Kolchak’s army. Entered into alliances with White Movement’s military leaders: Vladimir Kappel, Roman Ungern von Sternberg, Grigory Semyonov to protect Bashkirs’ interests.

=== Emigration ===
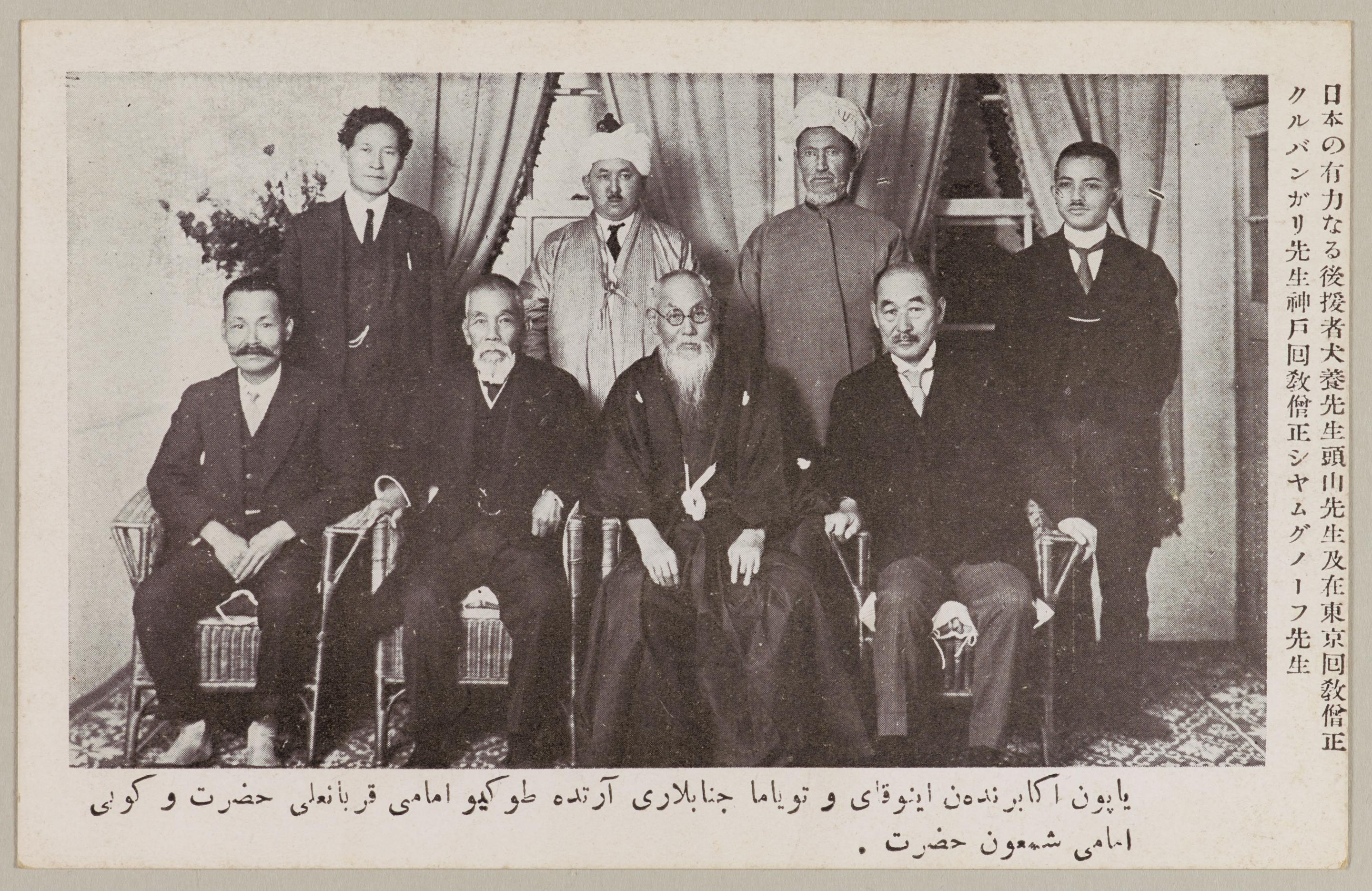
Early 1930s. Leaders of Japanese Nationalists (including future Prime Minister Tsuyoshi Inukai and Mitsuru Tōyama) and émigré Turkic-language communities. Kurbangaliev is second from the left, back row.

In October 1920, Kolchak's army with the affiliated Bashkir troops suffered a major defeat, surrendering the city of Chita to the Red Army. Muhammed Kurbangaliev emigrated to Manchuria, where he attempted to bring together the émigré Bashkir and Turkic-speaking communities, arrange for traditional Islamic religious practices among them, support native-language instruction, acting as an Imam and mudarris (teacher).

In 1924, moved to Japan, founded a Muslim community (mahallah called Islamiya) in Tokyo and became its religious leader. In 1927, opened a school for Japan's Muslims. In 1928, convened an all-Japan Muslims’ Congress. Opened print works which printed books in Arabic. Traveled extensively around the entire Japan preaching Islam, published several books about Turkic peoples and their histories.

In 1932-1936, founded a Muslim community in Manchukuo, a medrese in Mukden, a publication called ”Япон Мөхбире” (Yapon Möxbire “Japan's Herald” in Turkic languages). Published the first-ever Quran in the Far East.

He developed relationships with Korean and Manchurian businessmen and established close personal relations with Japan's military leaders: Ogasawara Naganari, Nango Judiro, politicians Ōkuma Shigenobu, Tōyama Mitsuru (leader of Genyōsha). He also received funds from Japan's financial oligarchies to support his religious and public activities.

On May 12, 1938, he opened the mosque "Islamiya" in Tokyo and became Japan's first Mufti. Japan's Muslim émigré community was involved in the international politics and promoted Japan's expansion in South-East Asia, seeing this as a means to liberate their ethnic homelands from the Communist rule. However, Muhammed Kurbangaliev's activities came to impede Japan's coherent policy toward the Muslim communities in and outside of the country, and the country's authorities arranged for his "voluntary departure" for Dalian, Manchuria. One of the reasons for his loss of influence was his close association with the Imperial Way Faction which was purged after the February 26 Incident in 1936.

Muhammed Kurbangaliev advocated Islam's equal positions in Japan alongside other religions. In 1939, Japan's PM Hiranuma Kiichirō announced that Islam had equal rights in Japan with Buddhism and Christianity.

=== Arrest, imprisonment, later life ===
In 1945, when World War II ended, Muhammed Kurbangaliev was arrested by NKVD (the Soviet secret Police), condemned to 10 years’ imprisonment for "high treason". Served his sentence in Vladimir Central Prison until 1955.

After his release, he returned to his native region. He settled in a rural community near Chelyabinsk where he served as a Mullah until his death in 1972.

== See also ==
- Islam in Japan
