= Hashem Rajabzadeh =

Hashem Rajabzadeh (Persian: هاشم رجب‌زاده) is a retired professor of Osaka University, researcher, translator, and Japanese language expert. He is an Iranian and he was born in 1941 in Tehran. He received a bachelor's degree in law from the University of Tehran and in 1973, he received a doctorate in human rights from the same university. His doctoral dissertation is titled Ritual of Government in the Ministry of Rashid al-Din Fazlullah Hamedani. Hashem Rajabzadeh was a member of the Ministry of Foreign Affairs of Iran in 1970, and from 1981 to 2011. He was a professor of Persian language and literature in the Department of Foreign Studies at Osaka University. On 23 May 2009 he received the Order of the Sacred Treasure.

== Works ==
- History of Iran from Ilkhanids to Qajar era (14th to 20th Centuries)
- Persian Literature
- Japanese History and Literature

== Education ==
- University: Tehran University, Faculty of Law and Political Sciences:
  - BA in Law, 1960–1964
  - MA in Law and Political Sciences, 1964–1968
  - PhD in Political Sciences and History, 1968–1972

== Decoration ==
Order of the Sacred Treasure; Gold Rays with Rosette.

== History of Membership in Academic Associations ==
- Japanese Society for Near Eastern Studies (the Oriento Gakkai)
- Japanese Society for Middle Eastern Studies (Nihon Chuto Gakkai)
- Society for Iranian Studies (North America)
- British Society for Middle Eastern Studies (BRISMES)
- Japanese Society for Iranian Studies
- Kansai Society for Iranian Studies
- Society for Iranian Studies
- Societas Iranologica Europaea (European Society for Iranian Studies))
- The International house of Japan (Nihon Kok)

== See also ==
- Iran–Japan relations
- Iranian diaspora
- Persian manuscript in Japan
- Iranians in Japan

== Sources ==
- Hashem Rajabzadehのオンライン記事(ペルシア語)
- Aftab新聞のHashem Rajabzadehについての記事（ペルシア語）
- ラジャブザーデさんの引っ越し 2020年5月7日閲覧。
- https://ci.nii.ac.jp/naid/40015434245
- *گاه شمار روابط ایران و ژاپن تا انقلاب اسلامی و از 1998 تا 2020
- Rajabzadeh, Hashem (1993). "Dabīr". Encyclopaedia Iranica, Vol. VI, Fasc. 5. pp. 534–539.
- Rajabzadeh, Hashem (2009). "JOVAYNI FAMILY". Encyclopaedia Iranica, Vol. XV, Fasc. 1. pp. 61–63.
