= Iranian Japanese =

Iranian Japanese or Japanese Iranian may refer to:

- Iran–Japan relations
- Iranians in Japan
- Japanese people in Iran
- Multiracial people of mixed Iranian and Japanese descent
