= Iranians in Japan =

Iranian-Japanese ایرانیان ژاپن
ایرانیان در ژاپن 在日イラン人

Total population
- 4,431 (in December, 2025)

Regions with significant populations
- Tokyo, Nagoya

Languages
- Japanese, Persian

Religion
- Shia Islam

Iranians in Japan (Japanese: 在日イラン人, Zainichi Iranjin, Persian: ایرانیان در ژاپن) are a minority group, with official statistics recording about 5,000 Iranian migrants in the country. Part of the Iranian diaspora, most live in the Greater Tokyo Area.

== Migration history ==
=== Ancient history ===
According to Akihiro Watanabe of the Nara National Research Institute for Cultural Properties, a mokkan (wooden tablet) dating back to the 7th century CE which was found in Nara Prefecture during the 1960s mentions a Persian official who lived and worked in Japan. Watanabe said that the official may have taught mathematics, citing Iran's expertise in the subject. The mokkan was deciphered in 2016 with the help of technology which allowed researchers to read characters not previously visible. Around the time the mokkan was inscribed, Nara would have been an ethnically diverse metropolitan area associated with the Silk Road and about to become Japan's capital city. Before the mokkan was discovered, the first written account of Persians in Japan was in the Nihon Shoki (The Chronicles of Japan, which was finished in 720). The book describes the arrival in Japan in 634 of several people from a place known in Japanese as Tokhārā (believed to be Tokharistan, which would have been part of the Sasanian Empire) and Dārā, a Persian man who worked for the emperor and returned to his homeland in 660. Another example of interaction between the Persians and the Japanese is the oldest known example of Persian writing in Japan, a one-page document with lines from the Shahnameh and the Vis and Rāmin and Jami' al-tawarikh. Discovered during the 20th century, the paper that was given by several Persians to the Japanese priest Kyōsei during the priest's 1217 trip to the port Quanzhou in China.

=== Modern history ===
After the end of the Iran–Iraq War in 1988, a number of Iranians (primarily men with lower-class, military, or criminal backgrounds) traveled to Japan to find work because the war and the Iranian Revolution had had a devastating effect on the Iranian economy. This coincided with an economic boom in Japan which created a need for unskilled laborers, allowing migrant workers without the money to travel to the Western world to secure high-paying jobs and support their families in Iran. Airfare subsidized by Iran Air and a bilateral visa-exemption agreement which had been in place for decades allowed for relatively easy and affordable travel between the countries. The workers arrived in Japan legally and received work permits which allowed them time (typically three months) to find work in Japan. A number of workers had trouble finding work while their permits were in effect, however, and reported that Japanese employers intentionally waited until a worker's permit expired to offer them a job at a fraction of the prevailing wage; deportation was a possibility if they complained about unfair wages. Some Iranians then became low-level yakuza (members of the Japanese mafia), selling illegal drugs and cell phones. In February 1979, the Iranian monarchy was collapsed by the revolution; nevertheless, the diplomatic relations with Japan have been inherited and the Embassy of Iran, Tokyo has continued to this day without any suspension.

== Return to Iran ==
Due to their inability to legalise their visa situation, 95 percent of Iranian migrants to Japan eventually returned to Iran; only a few, typically those who married Japanese citizens or found an employer who would sponsor their visa application, were able to stay. Unlike return migrants to traditional labour-exporting countries, most Iranians who return home from Japan find that they have no other opportunities to go abroad in search of higher wages to maintain their increased living standards or save more money. Iranian migrants stayed in Japan for an average of four years before returning home, during which time they remitted an average of $33,680. Most used that money to buy their own home in Iran or to start a business. Money earned abroad contributed significantly to their social mobility; 57 percent of a sample of 120 returnees used their savings to start their own business and become self-employed after holding unskilled jobs working for others or as farmers before their migration.

== Demographics and distribution ==
Like other labour migrants from Muslim countries, most Iranians in Japan are middle-aged. Seventy-six percent are 30 to 40 years old; six percent are younger than 20, and less than three percent are older than 50. The overwhelming majority are male; most are single, in their 20s or 30s, and had never travelled abroad before their migration. Married men are typically unaccompanied by family members. Most lived in Iranian cities before their migration, and many came from the neighbourhoods of southern Tehran; most were Persian speakers. Iranian migrants to Japan were less educated than other Muslim groups, such as Bangladeshis. Less than two percent of a sample of 120 Iranian migrants to Japan who had returned to Iran had a university or college education, and 73.1 percent left school before college. In Japan, they sent an average remittance of US$712 per month. Most originally worked in the construction industry; after the number of construction jobs decreased, many became vendors near train stations and were known for selling illegal telephone cards.

== Community spaces ==
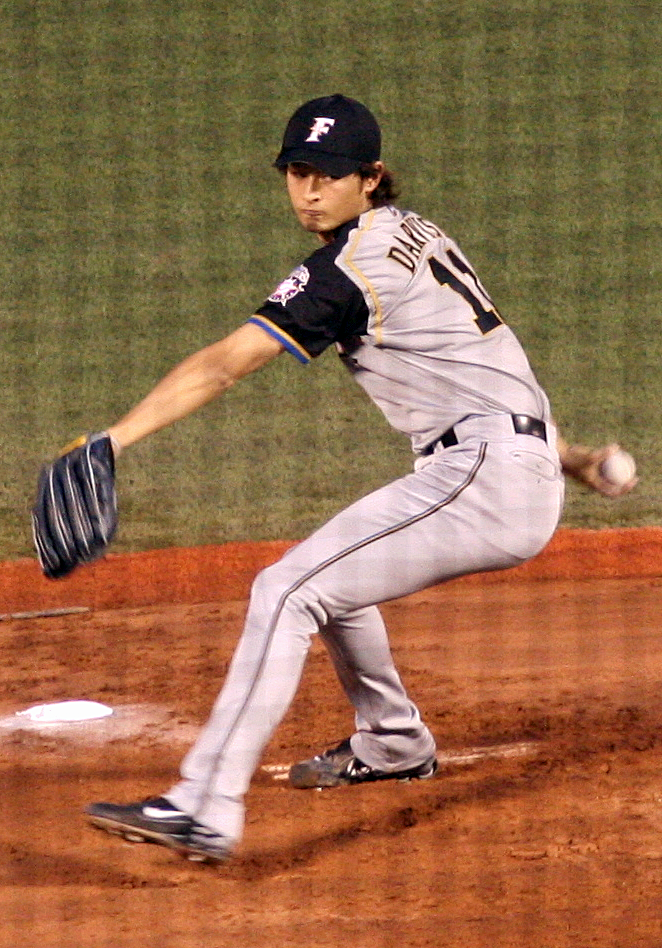
Yu Darvish in 2007

Public parks, especially Ueno and Yoyogi Parks, were initially the primary gathering points for the Iranian community. Many Iranians set up small stands selling imported Iranian products, and Japanese and Iranian brokers made money helping new arrivals find jobs. Complaints from neighbours and media coverage of illegal-drug and counterfeit-phone-card sales in the parks resulted in an increased police presence, however, and immigration officers began to conduct regular sweeps of the parks for people without documentation. Iranians began to avoid the parks, hoping to avoid being stereotyped as the "bad Iranians" who still assembled there, and the importance of public parks to the Iranian community declined.

With the parks less attractive for communal gatherings, mosques began to take on a similar function. As in Iran, most Iranians in Japan are followers of Shia Islam. Early in their migration, Iranians lacked the funds to establish a mosque and often used the prayer facilities of the Iranian embassy in Tokyo. They later established a mosque in Kodenma-chō, Chūō-ku with a management board dominated by Iranians, but with representatives of other nationalities. The mosque is also a community gathering point on non-Islamic holidays, especially Nowruz.

== Notable individuals ==
- Yu Darvish, professional baseball player
- Aria Jasuru Hasegawa, professional football player
- Shirin Nezammafi, Japanese language novelist
- May J., J-pop singer
- Sahel Rosa, model, television personality and actress
- Keihan Takahashi, professional volleyball player

== See also ==
- Iran–Japan relations
- Persian manuscript in Japan
- Embassy of Iran, Tokyo
- Indians in Japan
