= Keisei =

Keisei may refer to:

- Keisei (monk)
- Keisei Electric Railway
- Keisei Bus
