= Hyōtō Ryūkyū-koku ki =

1244 Japanese book about Ryukyu

Autograph manuscript

The Hyōtō Ryūkyū-koku ki (漂到流球国記) (loosely translated as Record of Drifting to the State of Ryūkyū') was a book written by Japanese Buddhist monk Keisei in 1244. He interviewed travelers who, during a sea voyage to Song China, drifted to what they believed to be Ryūkyū. It reflects the long-lasting Japanese perception of Ryūkyū as the land of man-eating demons.

== Content ==
The author Keisei (1189–1268) was a Tendai Buddhist affiliated with Onjō-ji and is said to be an elder brother of Regent Kujō Michiie. Interviewing a sailor and two passenger monks of the ship, he wrote the book in 1244. According to the book, the ship left Ojika of the Gotō Islands in western Kyushu for Song China on the 8th day of the 9th month of 1243. It was caught up in a storm for nine days, and on the 17th day, drifted to what the people believed to be Ryūkyū, where they made contacts with native people for a week. On the 26th day, they managed to set out to the ocean. They reached Fujian, China on the 29th day. They returned to Japan in the next year.

When they drifted to an island, they discussed where they were. One said Kikai (貴賀国) and another said Nanban (南蕃国). Yet another pointed to Ryūkyū (流球国), and they arrived at the conclusion that they were in Ryūkyū. They were frightened because Ryūkyū was believed to the land of man-eating demons.

On the 18th day, some twenty people landed but found no one in the wildland. On the next day, they saw cooking smoke in the distance. They also found a hut made of red woods, where they identified human bones in the hearth. Interpretting them as a sign of cannibalism, they became convinced that they were indeed in Ryūkyū.

On the 20th day, they explored a different direction and finally found a native man, who was in a child hairstyle (long unbound hair) and in barefoot, wore red clothes and a red headband, and was armed with a spear. On the 21st day, they were attacked by ships quite different from Japanese or Chinese ones. Each boat carried some ten warriors who fired a hail of arrows. The book contains a picture depicting the scene.

On the 22nd day, they reached a ceasefire. Having a close encounter with the natives, they found that the natives were taller and darker-skinned than Japanese. They wore pierced earrings and golden choker rings. Their language was different from Japanese or Chinese and they had no writing system. The Japanese gave kimono and rice and got boiled taro and dried seaweed in return.

== Ryūkyū: Okinawa Island or Taiwan? ==
What Ryūkyū referred to remains a matter of controversy. Ryūkyū was a loan word from Chinese (Liuqiu in Chinese). The Chinese accounts on Liuqiu since the Book of Sui were so vague and inconsistent that modern historians are unsure whether it referred to Okinawa Island or Taiwan.

Japanese historians Jun'ichi Yamazato and Shōsuke Murai argue that the Ryūkyū in this book was Okinawa Island. They believe that Taiwan is too close to Fujian for four or five days of a sea voyage. The red headband, red woods, and sabani-like boats are indicative of Okinawan features. Masatou Kodama questions the Okinawa hypothesis because the depiction of the natives are reminiscent of Taiwanese aborigines.

Regardless of what it referred to, Ryūkyū as the land of man-eating demons was a long-lasting Japanese perception. The first known Japanese use of the word was of 803, when Buddhist monk Kūkai sent a letter to a Chinese official. Kūkai stated that during a voyage to China, Kūkai and others "had lost their courage at the thought of the tiger-like nature of (the people of) Ryūkyū" (失膽留求之虎性). Similarly, Enchin drifted to what he believed to be Ryūkyū during his voyage to Tang China in 853. He later described Ryūkyū as the land of cannibals (所謂流捄国喫人之地). Because Enchin was the founder of Onjō-ji, with which Keisei was affiliated, Keisei had deeper knowledge about Enchin's voyage. Keisen concluded the book with a reference to Enchin's drift to Ryūkyū.

== Kikai and Nanban ==
Japanese historian Shūichi Nagayama notes the use of a positive character (貴, noble) for the first character of Kikai (貴賀国) while the rest of the 13th-century sources consistently used a negative character (鬼, ghost). He conjectures that by choosing the positive character, the civilized Kikai was contrasted with Ryūkyū, the land of man-eating demons. More than half a century before the voyage, the future shogun Minamoto no Yoritomo ordered Utsunomiya Nobufusa and Amano Tōkage to make a military expedition to Kikaigashima in 1187 and they managed to complete the operation in the next year. Nagayama identifies Kikai as Kikai Island of the Amami Islands.

Modern historians identify Nanban as Amami Ōshima. This word rarely appeared in historical sources, but more than two centuries earlier, it did refer to Amami Ōshima. According to the Nihon Kiryaku, the Nanban attacked Kyushu in 997. In the Shōyūki, the author Fujiwara no Sanesuke identified Nanban as Amami Island (i.e., Amami Ōshima). The Nihon Kiryaku states that Dazaifu, the administrative center of Kyushu, ordered Kikai Island to subdue the Nanban.

== See also ==
- Chikama Tokiie
- Map of Japan (Kanazawa Bunko)
- Persian manuscript in Japan
