= Shirin Nezammafi =

Iranian writer

Shirin Nezammafi (Persian: شیرین نظام‌مافی; Japanese: シリン・ネザマフィ) is an Iranian writer who resides in Japan. Though her native language is Persian, she writes in Japanese. She is fluent in English, Persian and Japanese.

== Biography ==
Nezammafi was born in Tehran, Iran, and moved to Japan in 1999. Nezammafi is a graduate of Kobe University, where she received her B.S. in Systems Engineering in 2004 and her M.S. in Information Technology in 2006. After graduation she joined Panasonic Corporation in Japan.

Nezammafi won the Bungakukai Shinjinsho Award (the New Authors Prize) in 2009 for her second book, White Paper. She was the second non-Japanese author to accomplish so (and the first from a nation whose native tongue does not utilize Chinese characters). In 2009, Nezammafi was nominated for the Akutagawa Prize and is the third writer from a country that doesn't use kanji to ever to be nominated for it.

== Publications ==
- "Shiroikami / Salam" (Bungeishunju, 2009-8-7, ISBN 4163284109)

Among her other works are:

- short story Nezammafi, Shirin. Saramu. ISBN 978-4-163-28410-1., winner of the 2006 Japanese Literary Award for International Students,
- Hakudo (Pulse) also nominated for the Akutagawa Prize in 2010, and
- Mimi no ue no choucho (The Butterfly on the Ear) in 2011.

== Prizes ==
- 2006, Won the Ryugakusei Bungakusho ("Salam")
- 2009-4, Won the 108th Bungakukai shinjinsho ("Shiroikami")
- 2009-7, Shortlisted for the 141st Akutagawa Prize ("Shiroikami")
- 2010-7, Shortlisted for the 143rd Akutagawa Prize ("Hakudou")

== Other activities ==
- Appearing in the Ministry of Foreign Affairs official video, Omotenashi: Japan Fascinating Diversity, 2012
- Commemorative lecture at Kobe University entrance ceremony of the academic year 2012

== External links/References ==
- Shirin Nezammafi, WorldCat
- List of Nezammafi's publications
