= Keisei (monk) =

Keisei's autograph manuscript of Hyōtō Ryūkyū no kuni no ki, now in the Imperial Household Agency

Keisei (1189–1268) was a Japanese Buddhist priest of the Tendai sect. He was a son of the regent Kujō Yoshitsune of the Fujiwara clan. His spine was permanently injured in infancy when he was dropped by his wet nurse, which probably influenced his decision to become a priest. He studied under the monk Myōe and then established a hermitage west of Kyōto. In 1217, he travelled to China, where he stayed about a year before returning to Japan. In China, he commissioned a nanban ("southern barbarian", i.e., a Persian) to write an inscription in Persian for Myōe.

In 1222, Keisei composed a collection of setsuwa entitled Kankyo no Tomo (Companion of a Quiet Life, or Companion in Solitude). It was formerly attributed to Jien. To Keisei has also been attributed the Hyōtō Ryūkyū no kuni no ki, an account of a voyage to the Ryūkyū Kingdom in 1244.
