= Embassy of Iran, Tokyo =

Coordinates: 35°38′53″N 139°43′52.5″E

Embassy of Iran, Tokyo سفارت جمهوری اسلامی ایران در ژاپن
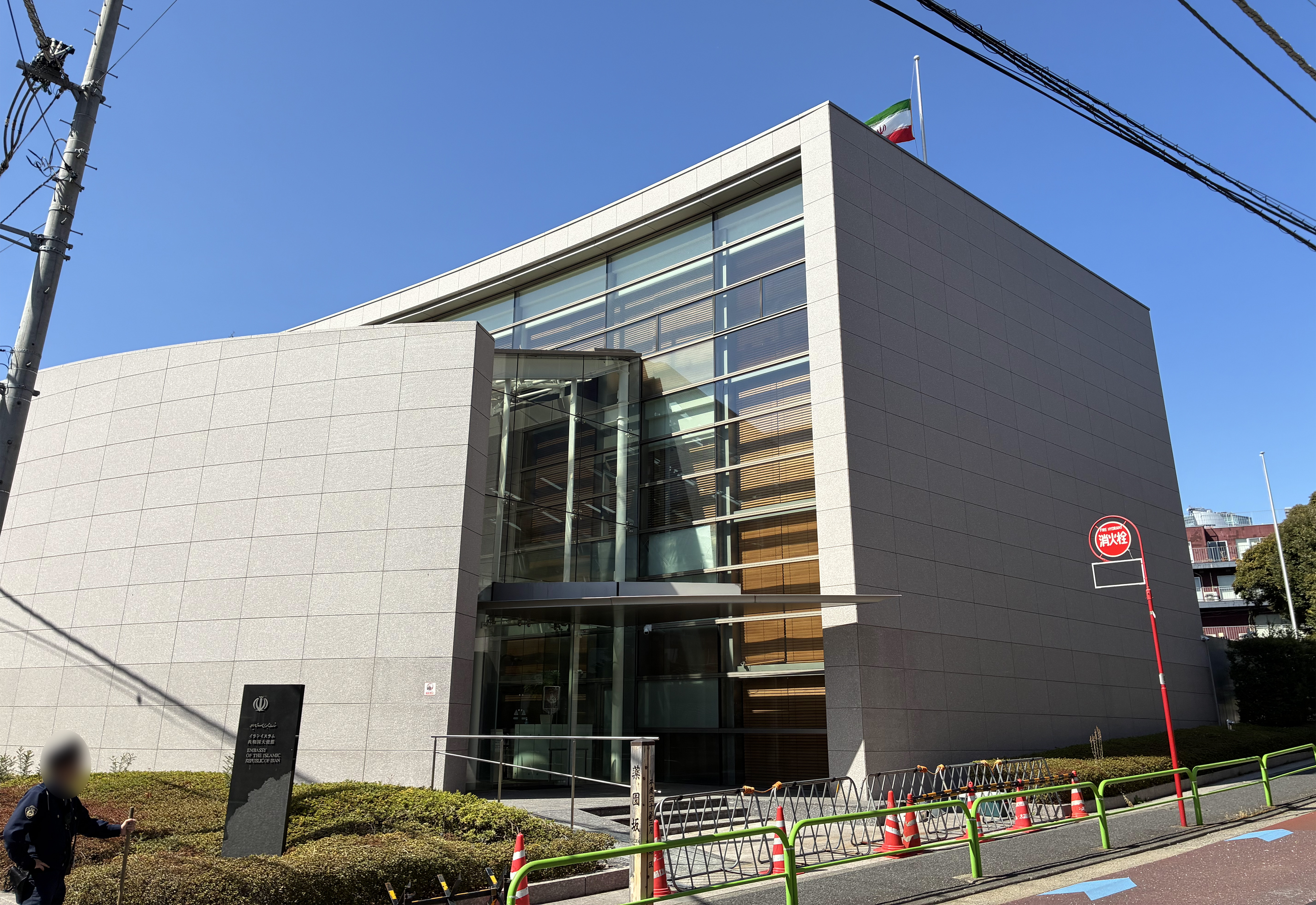
- Location: Japan
- Address: 3-13-9, Minami-Azabu Minato-Ku, Tokyo 106-0047
- Opened: 1930 (as legation); 1955 (as embassy)
- Ambassador: Peiman Seadat
- Website: https://japan.mfa.gov.ir/en
- https://twitter.com/IraninJapan

The Embassy of Iran in Tokyo (Persian: سفارت جمهوری اسلامی ایران در ژاپن) is the highest diplomatic representation of the Islamic Republic of Iran in Japan. Since 12 July 2023, Peiman Seadat has been the ambassador.

== Location ==
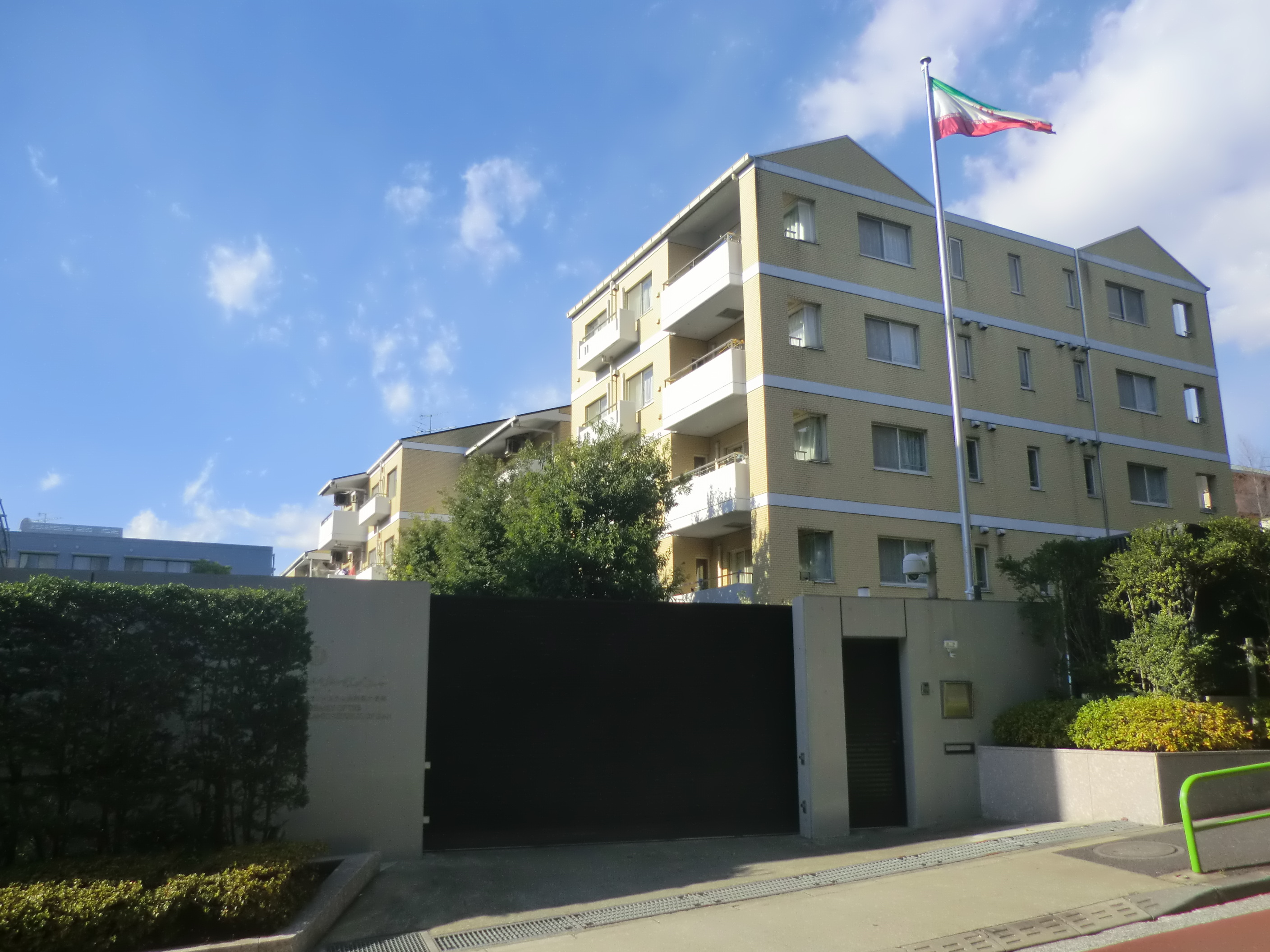
Embassy of Islamic Republic of Iran in Japan

The embassy is located in the Minato Area, Tokyo. The postal address is as follows:

3-13-9 Minami-Azabu Minato-Ku, Tokyo 106-0047

== History ==
In July 1930, the Imperial Legation of Iran in Tokyo was initially opened, but the diplomatic relations between Iran and Japan and the exchange of envoys extraordinary and minister plenipotentiary were suspended during the Second World War. After the war they were all resumed, and in February 1955, the Iranian highest mission in Tokyo was promoted from legation to embassy. In February 1979, the Iranian monarchy was collapsed by the revolution; nevertheless, the diplomatic relations with Japan have been inherited and the Embassy of Iran in Tokyo has continued to this day without any suspension.

== See also ==
- List of ambassadors of Iran to Japan
- Iran–Japan relations
