= Iran–Japan relations =

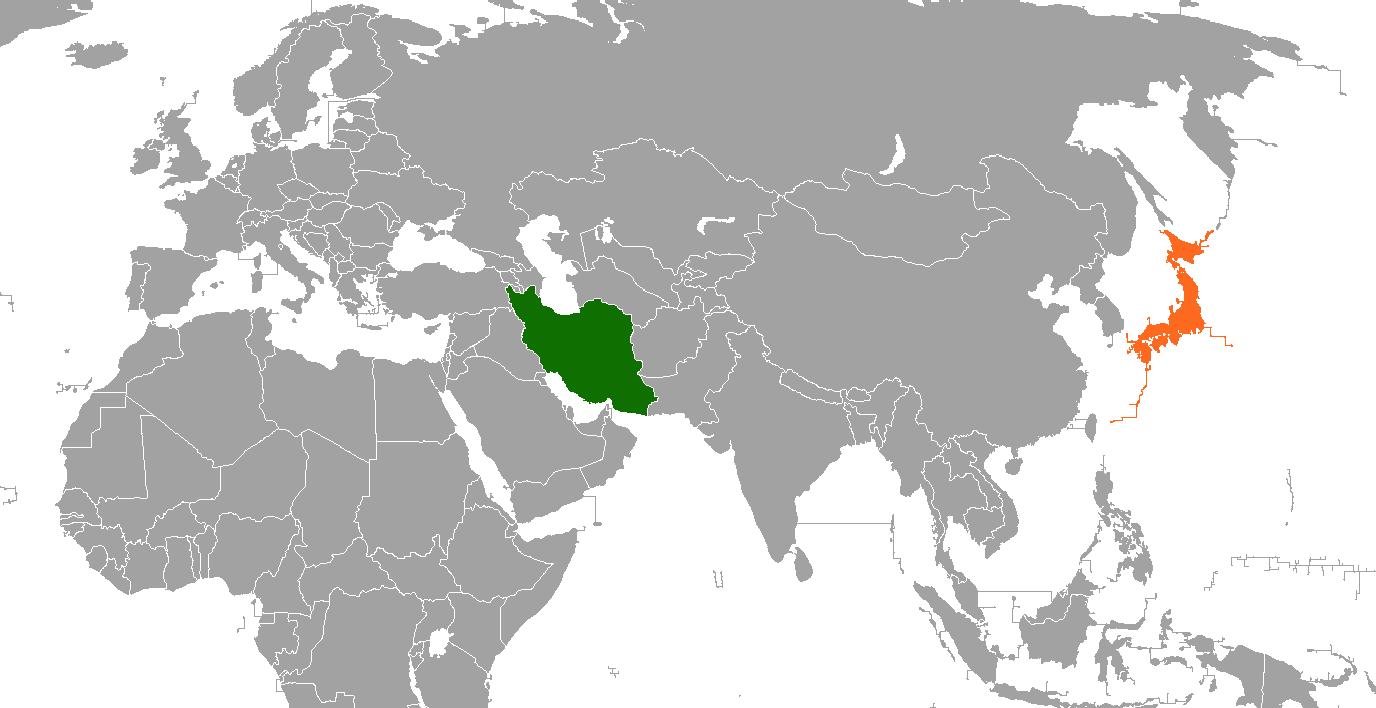

- Iran: Japan

Diplomatic mission
- Embassy of Iran, Tokyo: Embassy of Japan, Tehran

Iran–Japan relations (Persian: روابط ایران و ژاپن, Japanese: 日本とイランの関係) are diplomatic relations between Iran and Japan. They were officially established in 1926 during the Pahlavi era. With the exception of World War II, the two countries have maintained a relatively friendly, strong, and strategic relationship throughout history.

Japan's foreign policy and investment with Iran have been significantly influenced by its historically secure demand for energy supplies. Iran is Japan's third most important oil supplier after Saudi Arabia and the United Arab Emirates. Japan and Iran are also cooperating in regional diplomatic relations in the Middle East, such as the reconstruction of Afghanistan and the Israel-Palestinian conflict. The trade balance between Japan and Iran has a significant weight on Iran, and Japan exports automobiles, electrical products, important petroleum products and petrochemical products.

Japanese Prime Minister Shinzo Abe visited Iran in June 2019 to try to mediate between Iran and the United States.

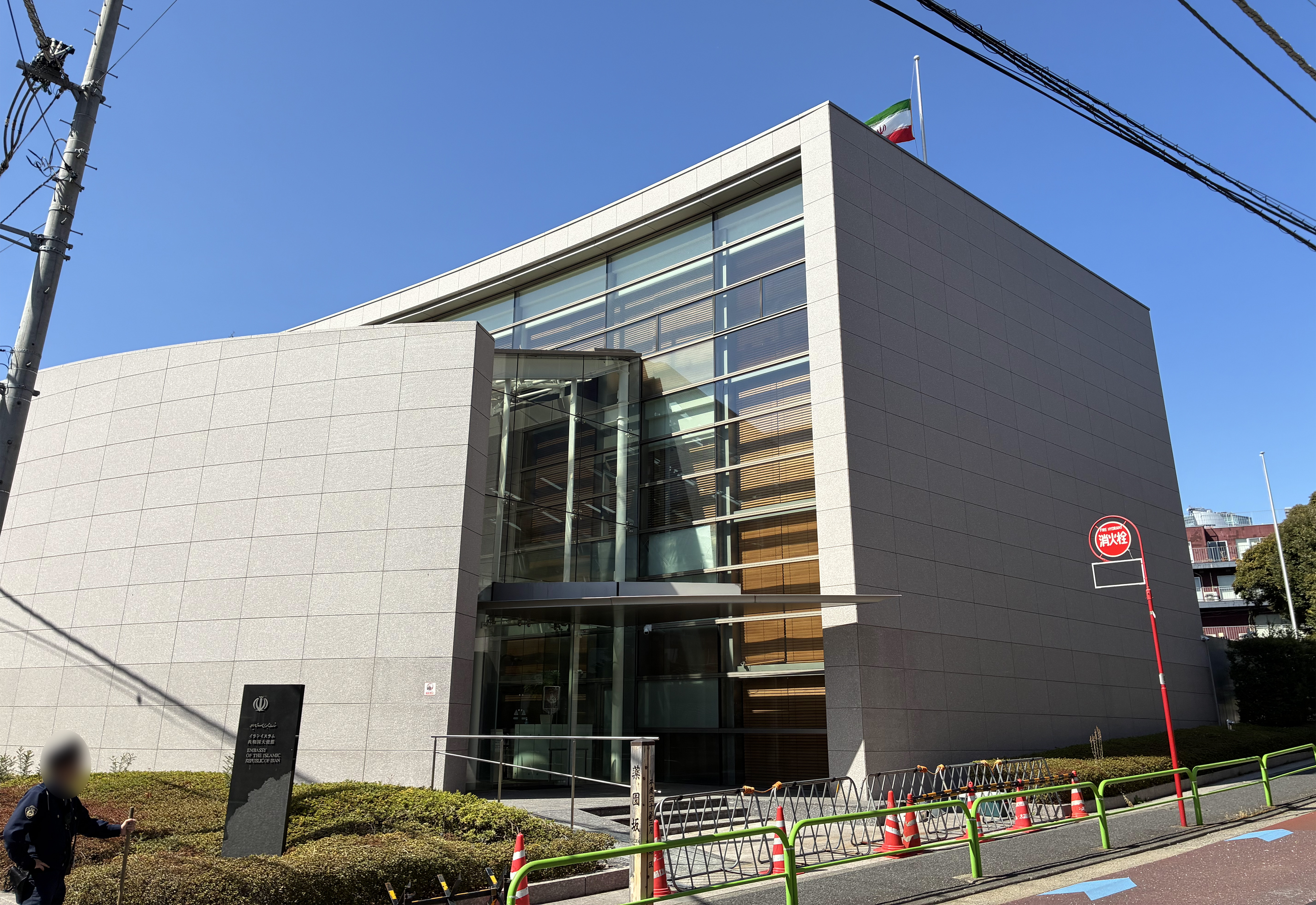
Embassy of Iran in Japan

== History ==
=== Pre Meiji Restoration - 1868 ===
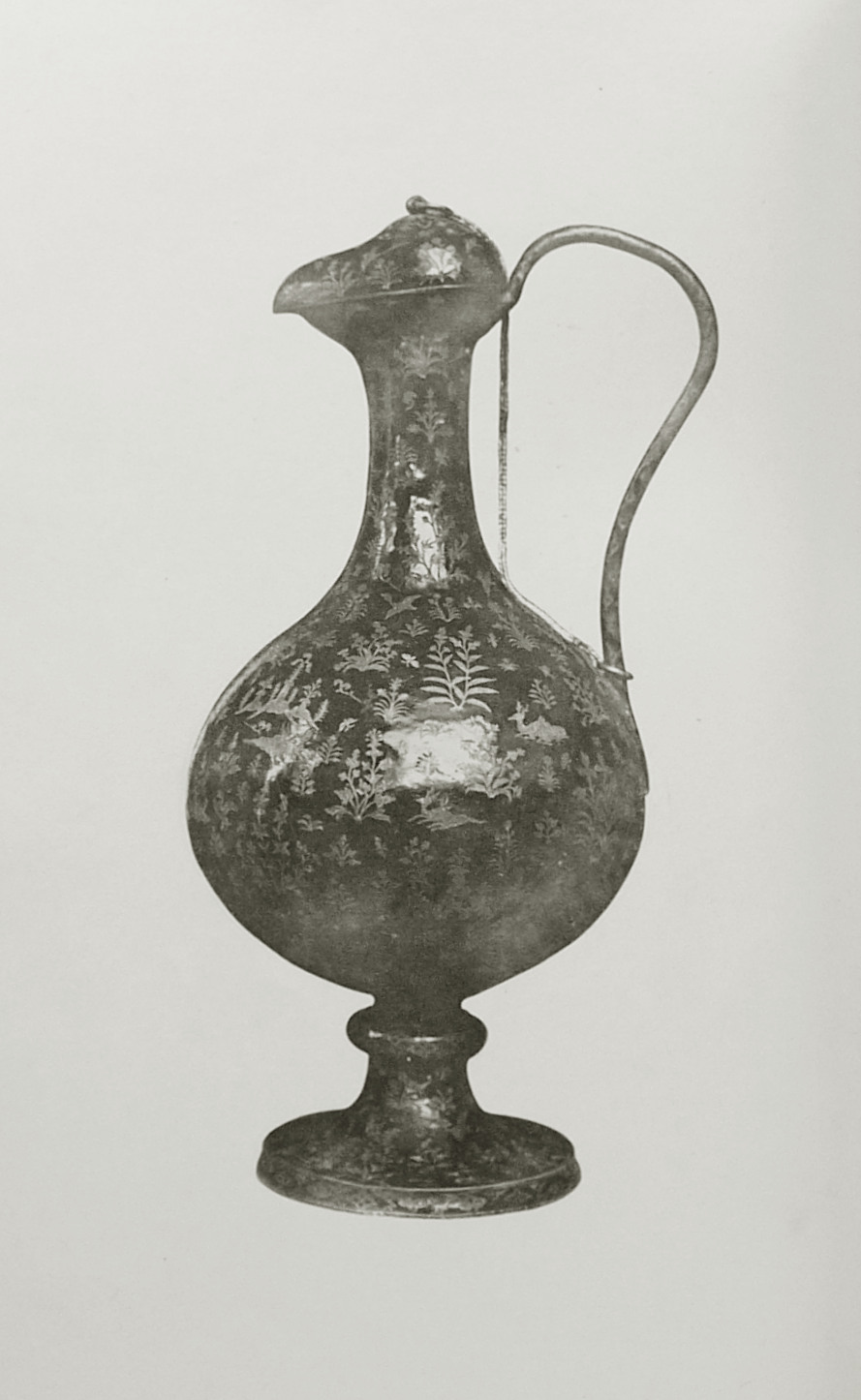
LACQUERED EWER Shosoin Japan

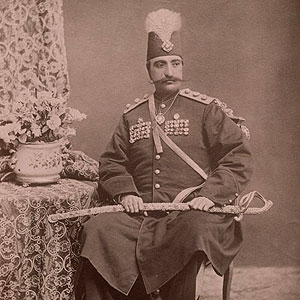
Ermakov, Dimitri (1846–1916). Naser al-Din Shah Qajar (Georgian National Museum)

Present-day Iran and Japan were known to have had direct trade links since at least the 7th century, but new testing on a piece of wood—first discovered in the 1960s—suggests broader ties, Japanese researchers said. Infrared imaging revealed previously unreadable characters on the wood—a standard writing surface in Japan before paper—that named a Persian official living in the country. Cultural influence from the Iranian-speaking Central Asia at the golden age of the Silk Road Buddhism found itself as far as Japan through the role of China. Japan and Iran (Persia) have had almost no direct interaction because of the geographical distance until the 19th century since the dawn of history. Prior to the Meiji Restoration, the two countries were only in a relationship where Iran-influenced works of art were brought to Japan via the Silk Road. As a few exceptions, the Persians who visited Japan during the Tenpyo era in the Nara period are described in the court-commissioned history book Shoku Nihongi. In 736 (Tenpyo 8), Nayo, a deputy envoy to China, returned to Japan with three Chinese and one Persian, and had an audience with Emperor Shomu. This was the period during which coincided with the late rule of Fujiwara's four children in Japan. The Persian, recorded under the Chinese name Lee Jin-hee, has been awarded a rank, but his whereabouts are unknown. In 2016, it was revealed that there was a Daigaku-ryō dormitory official (at the time of 765) called Hashi no Kiyomichi by deciphering the wooden tablets excavated from the Heijo Palace ruins. Hashi (Hashi) is a name meaning Persia. It is speculated that it may be Ri Mitsuei or a related person.

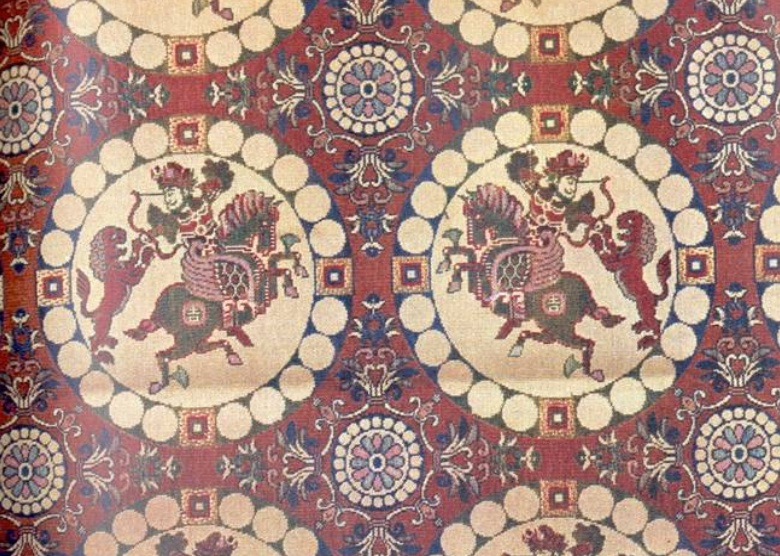
Sassanid silk found in Japan (224–651 AD)

The Iranian official Shaykh Ahmad who moved to the Thai kingdom of Ayutthaya crushed and defeated Japanese merchants who attempted a coup against the Thai king in 1611.

=== Meiji Restoration through World War II (1868-1945) ===
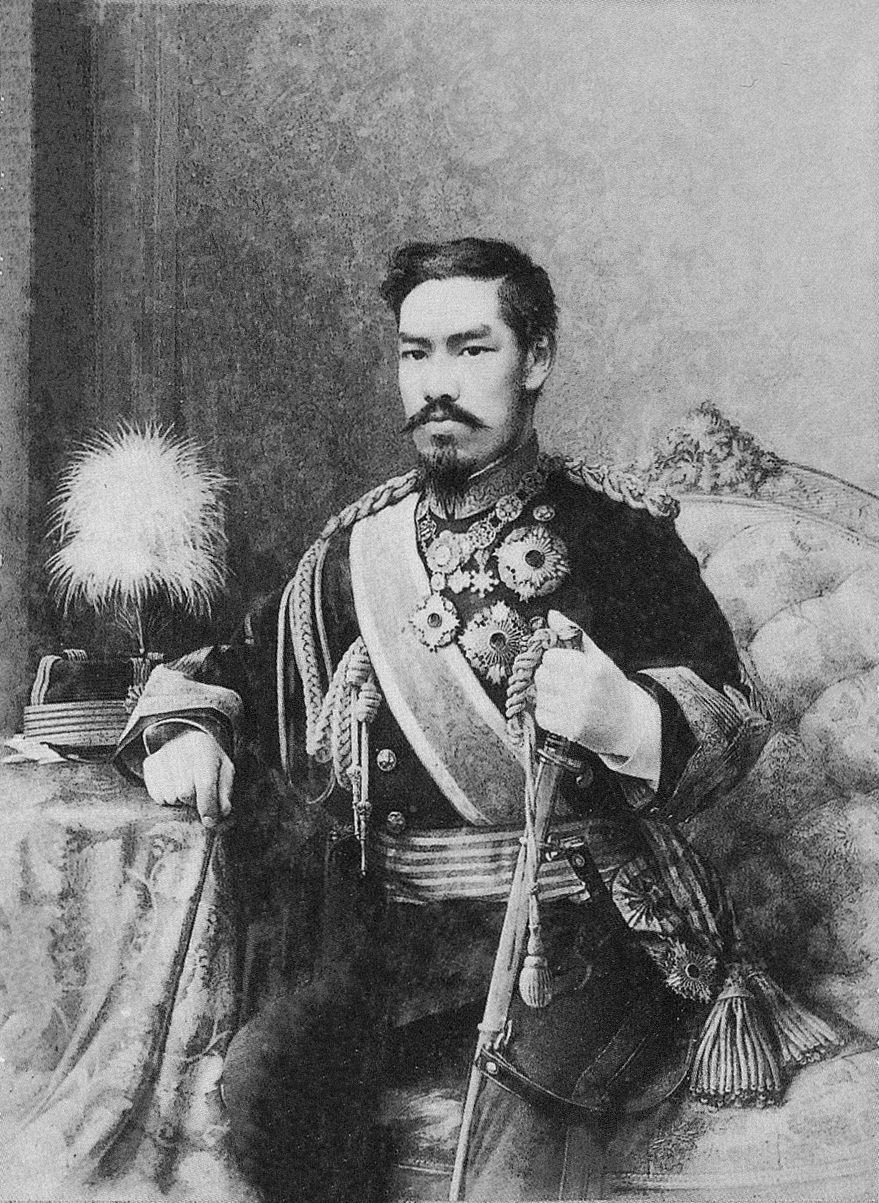
Emperor Meiji

In 1878, Takeaki Enomoto, a Japanese envoy to the Russian Empire, officially had an audience with King Naser al-Din Shah of the Qajar Iran in St. Petersburg. In 1880, a delegation with Masaharu Yoshida, a ministry of foreign affairs, was the first Japanese person to set foot in Persia, and in Tehran, he had an audience with Naser al-Din Shah and obtained permission to trade. However, formal diplomatic relations were not established until 1926 after the establishment of the Pahlavi dynasty. In 1935, the Pahlavi dynasty changed its name from Persia to Iran. The Japan-Iran Friendship Treaty was signed in 1939, as was Spain, Sweden, and Switzerland, which remained neutral in World War II, partly because King Reza Shah was pro-Germany. In addition, a sincere relationship was established with Japan. After the outbreak of the Great East Asia War (Pacific War), Iran declared neutrality, but it was extremely difficult for Iran, which had already received explicit internal affairs interference from Britain and the Soviet Union, to maintain its neutrality. Back in August–September 1941, British and Soviet troops overrun Iran's territory and forcibly deposed Reza Shah, a pro-German and politically skilled man, and made a young and easy-to-use Crown Prince Mohammad a new monarch. The British and Soviet Union kept interfering Iran and would not stop doing so. As a result of these diplomatic pressures, Iran broke diplomatic relations with Japan in April 1942 and declared war on the Axis powers, including Japan, on February 28, 1945. After that, in August 1945, Japan accepted the Potsdam Declaration and surrendered without restoring diplomatic relations between Japan and Iran.

=== Post World War II to the Iranian Revolution (1945-1979) ===
Official diplomatic relations between Japan and Iran were revived in 1953, after the San Francisco Peace Treaty was signed. [20] In 1953, the Nissho Maru Incident occurred. This case is sometimes pointed out as one of the reasons for why Iranians are pro-Japanese.

In 1955, Iran, the United Kingdom, Turkey, Pakistan, and Iraq formed the anti-communist Baghdad Pact (METO). Three member states bordered the Soviet Union; the group was positioned be a Middle East version of NATO (called by some the "Baghdad Treaty Organization"). As sovereign nations in the anti-communist camp, bilateral relations between Japan and Iran, which had just established formal diplomatic relations, were extremely good. Led by the import and export of oil, economic relations deepened and the imperial families of both countries made official visits to each other.

In 1958, a coup d’état overthrowing the royal government occurred in Iraq, a neighboring country of Iran, and the pro-US anti-communist Iraqi kingdom collapsed. The following year, in 1959, Iraq, which had deepened its ties with the Soviet Union, withdrew from the Baghdad Pact. As a result, the Baghdad Pact was renamed the Central Treaty Organization (CENTO), and its headquarters moved from Baghdad to Ankara, the capital of Turkey, which was also a NATO member. Iran, remained in the anti-communist camp, for nearly 20 years, a time when it became increasingly important in the Middle East. As with good relations, Iran continued to be a friendly nation towards Japan, which is centered on the Japan-US security system. In 1974, Japan and Iran signed a visa-exempt tourism agreement, allowing citizens of both countries to freely visit each other. In June 1976, it was decided to establish the Consulate General of Japan in Khorramshahr (Khorramshahr), which was prosperous as a petroleum chemical industry zone, and the Consulate General was opened in January 1977. At this point, it could be said that the friendly relationship between Japan and Iran had reached its peak.

=== Revolution to Ahmadinejad (1979-2013) ===
In February 1979, a revolution occurred in Iran and the Pahlavi dynasty collapsed, revealing an anti-American stance in Iran, which had been pro-US until then. In November of the same year, a mob broke into the U.S. embassy in the capital Tehran and took the embassy staffs as hostage. That was an act similar to a declaration of war, and the Iranian authorities were originally in a position to crack down on mobs, but the Iranian interim government at that time was in a dual government state with the anti-American radical Islamic Revolutionary Council. Therefore, it was not possible to release the hostages. Furthermore, when the interim government resigned due to the incident, the Revolutionary Council officially seized political power and began to defend the mob in the shadows. [23] In April 1980, the United States notified Iran of the severance of diplomatic relations and imposed economic sanctions. US President Jimmy Carter, who was unable to resolve the case, was severely damaged in his prestige and was unable to re-elect in his presidential election, contributing to the change of government to Ronald Reagan. The US embassy hostage case was resolved shortly after President Reagan took office, but the case decisively worsened relations between Iran and the United States.

In addition to the above-mentioned US embassy hostage crisis, in the 1980s, the Iran-Iraq War (which almost coincided with the time of the Reagan administration) created a composition in which the United States supported Iran's enemy Iraq. It was to protect the Gulf nations, an important pro-US group, from Iran's overthrow of royal rule. The influence of US foreign policy has put pressure on Japan to reduce its relations with Iran, while the result is that Japan's relations with Iraq have deepened. Since then, Japan has established a scheme of "maintaining and strengthening relations with Iran to the extent possible while looking at the complexion of the United States." In April 1992, the visa-exempt tourism agreement, which had been signed and inherited before the revolution, was suspended due to an increase in the number of Iranians living illegally in Japan despite entering the country for tourism purposes. Since 2004, Japan has been developing Iran's largest Azadegan oil field. On February 23, 2010, Iran's Speaker of Parliament, Ali Larijani, visited Japan by the invitation of the House of Representatives. The Speaker met with Foreign Minister H.E. Mr. Katsuya Okada on February 24 and on February 27, visited Nagasaki City to visit the Nagasaki Atomic Bomb Museum for the first time. The Speaker commented to reporters, "If there is even one atomic bomb in the world, it is a threat to humankind. People should stand up for a world without nuclear weapons.” After the tour, the Speaker and Mr. Tomihisa Taue, Mayor of Nagasaki, donated flowers to the monument to the center of the atomic bomb fall in the hypocenter park near the museum. [25] On December 9, 2011, Japan suspended its correspondent relationship with banks under "Additional Targets for Measures Accompanying the Implementation of United Nations Security Council Resolution 1929." The permit system allows payments to three banks involved in Iran's nuclear energy development, 106 groups / individuals other than banks, and capital transactions with designated persons. *3 banks (20 banks in total, including successive resolutions and ancillary measures last year) Persons other than banks 106 groups / 1 individual (total of 267 groups / 66 individuals including successive resolutions and incidental measures last year) In addition, in response to a statement from the Financial Action Task Force (FATF), we requested financial institutions to thoroughly fulfill their obligations to verify the identity of customers, to report suspicious transactions, and to notify foreign exchange transactions.

=== Rouhani administration (2013-2020) ===
Since the resignation of President Khatami in 2005, there has been no summit meeting between Japan and Iran for a long time. However, in response to the result of the House of Representatives election in December 2012, Shinzo Abe returned to the Prime Minister in Japan, and in Iran, hard-line President Mahmoud Ahmadinejad reached the end of his longest term in June 2013. When Hassan Rouhani became president in August of the same year following the result of the presidential election, the leaders of the two countries rapidly improved their relationship. Prime Minister Abe was one of the first to congratulate President Hassan Rouhani on his inauguration, and in September of the following year, he sent Special Envoy of Prime Minister, Masahiko Komura, who carried the Prime Minister's letter, to Iran to meet with President Hassan Rouhani and others. In recent years, it has become customary for Prime Minister Abe and President Hassan Rouhani to meet at the opportunity to attend international conferences in third countries, such as the UN General Assembly held annually in New York. Specifically, the first summit meeting was realized after President Rouhani took office in New York, where the UN General Assembly is being held on September 26, 2013 (local time), and the following year, September 23, 2014, a second summit meeting was held in New York, also during the UN General Assembly. In 2015, not only did the regular summit meeting be held in New York during the UN General Assembly on September 27, but also held the summit meeting on the occasion of 60th anniversary of Asia and Africa on April 22 in Jakarta, where the anniversary was held. In September 2016, in New York, where the UN General Assembly was being held, the Abe-Rouhani Summit Meeting was held for the fourth time and the fifth time in total. In August 2016, Japan's active Prime Minister was scheduled to visit Iran for the first time in 38 years since Prime Minister Takeo Fukuda visited Iran just before the revolution. However, Japan decided to cancel the visit. According to government sources, Prime Minister Abe intended to wait for the US presidential election and then reconsider the pros and cons of visiting Iran.

On the night of January 8, 2017 (local time), Iran's Public Interest Council Chairman and former President Akbar Hashemi Rafsanjani, a disciple of Khomeini, died of a heart attack at a hospital in Tehran, at the age of 82. The following day, on the 9th, Foreign Minister Fumio Kishida issued a message of condolences, and on the 10th, Prime Minister Abe issued a message of heartfelt condolences while remembering the achievements of former President Akbar Hashemi Rafsanjani. In response to this news, Mitsuji Suzuka, the Japanese ambassador to Afghanistan, visited the Iranian embassy in Afghanistan and met with the Iranian ambassador to Afghanistan Iran. While reminiscing about the deceased, saying that he had met and talked with him, he said in Persian, which he is good at, "I express my deep mourning for the death of Rev. Rafsanjani. January 10 / Mitsuji Suzuka, Japanese Ambassador to Afghanistan ". Following the presidential election (Persian and English) held in Iran on May 19, 2017, and the announcement of the re-election of the incumbent President Hassan Rouhani on the following day, Prime Minister Abe and Foreign Minister Kishida sent a congratulatory message to President Rouhani.

On May 8, 2018, US President Donald Trump declared a unilateral withdrawal from the nuclear agreement that was made with P5+1 countries and Iran. In response to this, on the following day, Foreign Minister Taro Kono said, “Japan, however, continues to support the JCPOA which contributes to the strengthening of the international non-proliferation regime and stability of the Middle East, and hopes for constructive actions by relevant parties.”」. Japan announced a discourse that it would continue to support the maintenance of the nuclear agreement, not in line with US sanctions on Iran. However, Trump reinstated economic sanctions on Iran in November of the same year, and Iran rebelled against this, deteriorating relations. On June 12, 2019, Prime Minister Abe visited Iran to meet with President Hassan Rouhani and Supreme Leader Ayatollah Ali, and attempted to bridge the gap with the United States. On June 12, 2019, Prime Minister Abe's visit to Iran was realized as originally planned. In the evening of the same day, Prime Minister Abe met with President Hassan Rouhani and announced that Japan would cooperate with Iran in the fields of medical care, environment, disaster prevention, etc., and Iran would play a constructive role in stabilizing the Middle East as a regional power. Requested to fulfill. In addition, cooperation in the field of disaster prevention is not limited to a verbal diplomatic decree, and it was communicated at the summit meeting with President Hassan Rouhani that Japan will implement an emergency grant-in-aid for a total of $2.5 million to support flood damage in Iran. The following morning, on the morning of the 13th, Prime Minister Abe met with Supreme Leader Khamenei and called on Iran to play a constructive role in stabilizing the Middle East as a regional power, similar to what he had insisted on President Hassan Rouhani. It can be said that Prime Minister Abe's visit to Iran in 2019 was generally welcomed locally and succeeded in strengthening bilateral relations between Japan and Iran. However, on the other hand, Ayatollah Khamenei said in a meeting with Prime Minister Abe, "I have no doubt about Prime Minister Abe's good intentions and sincerity, but President Trump is not a worthy exchange of messages.” "I will not reply to Mr. Trump," "President Trump said he is ready to talk with Iran, but after meeting with Prime Minister Abe, he imposed sanctions on the petrochemical field and it is not sincere." He expressed a deep-seated distrust of President Trump, and Prime Minister Abe's visit to Iran did not contribute to the restoration of relations between the United States and Iran. In addition, Middle East journalist Yasunori Kawakami pointed out in fact that "Prime Minister Abe's visit was a complete failure in terms of mediation between the United States and Iran". During an official visit to Iran, Prime Minister Abe asked to set up a secret meeting between the United States and Iran in Tokyo to mediate the improvement of relations between the United States and Iran, but this mediation plan did not come true. On December 20, 2019, President Hassan Rouhani visited Japan for the first time in 19 years as the incumbent president and held a summit meeting with Prime Minister Abe for more than three hours from 18:00 on the same day. Prime Minister Abe expressed concern over Iran's excessive retaliation for the US withdrawal from the Joint Comprehensive Plan of Action (JCPOA) and acknowledged the importance of working with the International Atomic Energy Agency (IAEA). President Hassan Rouhani explained Iran's position that it had no choice but to take retaliatory measures to suspend the implementation of the nuclear agreement, while stating that it was important for Iran to maintain the nuclear agreement. In addition, Prime Minister Abe explained that the Self-Defense Forces are independently guarding vessels navigating the Persian Gulf region without being under the command of the U.S. military. After showing an understanding of Japan's intention to contribute to ensuring safety, he praised Japan's transparent explanation of these activities to Iran. The year 2019 marks the 90th anniversary of Iran and Japan's diplomatic relationship according to BBC.

On August 28, 2020, Prime Minister Abe announced at a press conference held at the Prime Minister's Office that he would resign from the post of Prime Minister because of his poor physical condition. According to The New York Times, in an attempt to find a solution to Iran's stalemate situation with U.S., Iran has proposed President Rouhani visit Japan, as reported by the Kyodo News Agency.

=== 2020-present ===
On September 16, 2020, Yoshihide Suga took office as the 99th Prime Minister in place of Prime Minister Abe, who resigned. The following day, on the 17th, President Hassan Rouhani sent a message to Prime Minister Suga, congratulating him on his inauguration as Prime Minister and praising former Prime Minister Abe for strengthening relations between Japan and Iran and hoped for the deepening of mutual cooperation.

A presidential election was held in Iran on June 18, 2021, which is the milestone year of the 1400 calendar in the Iranian calendar, and as a result of the ballot counting, candidate Ebrahim Raisi was elected as president-elect. Foreign Press Secretary Tomoyuki Yoshida issued a discourse on the Iran presidential election on the 21st of the same month, three days later. “I hope Iran will play a constructive role. " This comment was in contrast to Prime Minister Abe and Foreign Minister Kishida celebrating the re-election during the 2017 re-election of President Hassan Rouhani, saying, "I would like to express my heartfelt congratulations." Also, Prime Minister Yoshihide Suga and Foreign Minister Toshimitsu Motegi did not send congratulations to Raisi until he became president.

On August 5, 2021, Prime Minister Yoshihide Suga issued a congratulatory address following the inauguration of President Raisi.

In June 2025, Japan condemned Israeli strikes against Iran, calling them "completely unacceptable and deeply regrettable".

== Visits of VIPs ==
Pahlavi Period (1925–1979)

In June 1957, Iran's King's sister Fateme Pahlavi and her husband visited Japan. In May 1958, King's brother Gholam Reza Pahlavi visited Japan, and then King Mohammad Reza Pahlavi visited Japan as a state guest. After that, the royal government was overthrown in 1979, so this was the last visit of the Iranian royal family in history. In addition, since the Supreme Leader of Iran has never visited Japan, the king's visit to Japan in 1958 is the last visit of the head of state of Iran. (President Khatami visited Japan later, but the head of state of Iran is the supreme leader, and the president is not the head of state.)

In October 1971, Princess Yuriko Mikasa visited Iran for the 2500th anniversary of the founding of the Persian Empire. Since then, the Japanese royal family has never visited Iran, so this is the last case of a Japanese royal family visiting Iran.

In September 1978, Prime Minister Takeo Fukuda visited Iran. This was the last visit to Iran in the Pahlavi dynasty by the Japanese Prime Minister, as the revolution occurred in February of the following year and the Pahlavi dynasty collapsed.

Islamic Republic of Iran Period (1979-)

In October 1979, Minister of International Trade and Industry Masumi Esaki visited Iran after the revolution for the first time as an active minister of Japan. In August 1983, Foreign Minister Shintaro Abe visited Iran after the revolution for the first time as an active foreign minister of Japan. In April 1984, Foreign Minister Ali Akbar Velayati visited Japan for the first time as an active minister of Iran after the revolution.

1989 was the year of great sadness in both Japan and Iran, when Emperor Showa died in January and Ayatollah Khomeini died in June. In February of the same year, Vice President Mostafa Mir Salim visited Japan for a memorial service with great mourning. In July of the same year, Masayuki Fujio, the Liberal Democratic Party's political chairman, visited Iran as a condolence mission to the Supreme Leader Ayatollah Khomeini, who died the previous month. In addition, Moayeri, Advisor to president, visited Japan for the coronation of Emperor Akihito in 1990.

In October 2000, Iran's President Mohammad Khatami visited Japan. This was the first visit to Japan by Iranian leaders after the revolution, and it was the first visit to Japan by the Iranian leaders in 42 years since the King's visit to Japan in 1958, including the Pahlavi dynasty.

In August 2004, former Prime Minister Ryutaro Hashimoto visited Iran after the revolution for the first time as a former Japanese prime minister. In April 2012, former Prime Minister Yukio Hatoyama visited Iran. During the Heisei era (January 1989-April 2019), the incumbent Prime Minister of Japan never visited Iran.

In June 2019, Prime Minister Shinzo Abe was the first incumbent Prime Minister to visit post-revolutionary Iran, where he also met with President Hassan Rouhani and Supreme Leader Ayatollah Ali Khamenei. This is the first time that the incumbent Prime Minister met with the Supreme Leader. In addition, Prime Minister Abe himself accompanied his father, Shintaro Abe, when he visited Iran during his time as Foreign Minister, and met with Khamenei, who was the president at that time.

== Trade relations ==
Japan's foreign policy towards and investments in Iran have historically been dominated by the desire to secure reliable energy supplies; Iran is Japan's third-largest oil supplier after Saudi Arabia and the United Arab Emirates. Before 2012, Iran has been providing Japan as a major supplier of its crude oil, about 10 to 15% of its supply.

The balance of trade between Iran and Japan is heavily weighed in favor of Iran, with Japan exporting automobiles and electrical products and importing petroleum and petrochemical products. As of 2010, Japan cooperates with Iran on several major projects; the annual trade volume of the two states exceeds $11 billion.

On August 29, 2023, President Raisi urged Japan to release Iranian assets, clarifying that only South Korea held unjustly frozen funds, as part of a deal linking the release of detained US citizens in Iran to the unfreezing of $6 billion in Iranian assets in South Korea amid US sanctions.

Following the outbreak of war between Iran and Israel in March 2026, Japan experienced difficulties in procuring oil. Currently, Japan procures about 95% of its oil from the Middle East, and about 70% of the oil is transported through the Strait of Hormuz. The difficulties experienced led to considerations of using strategic petroleum reserves, diversifying oil suppliers, and increasing energy efficiency. Therefore, the energy relationship with the Middle East and the energy security approach of Japan were affected.

== Comparison of the two countries ==
	Iran	Japan	Difference between two countries
Population	85,100,000 (2025)	127,110,000 (2015)	Japan is about 1.6 times greater than Iran
Land	1,648,195,000 km^{2}	377,972,000 km^{2}	Iran is about 4.4 times larger than Japan
Capital	Tehran	Tokyo	
Largest city	Tehran	Tokyo	
Political regime	Islamic Republic	Parliamentary government/cabinet system	
Official language	Persian	Japanese	
State religion	Twelver Shi’ism	None	
GDP	US$396,915,000,000 (2015)	US$4,116,242,000,000 (2015)	Japan is about 10.4 times than Iran
Defense Cost	US$10,265,000,000 (2015)	US$40,900,000,000 (2015)	Japan is about 4 times than Iran

== Cultural exchanges ==
=== Persian language education in Japan ===
In 1925, Japan's first Persian language institute was opened as a training language for the Indian Language Department of the Osaka University of Foreign Studies. In 1961, the Osaka University of Foreign Studies established the Persian Language Department. In Japan before the Iranian Revolution, only the Osaka University of Foreign Studies had a permanent Persian language department. In 2007, Osaka University of Foreign Studies was integrated into Osaka University, but the Persian language major continues to belong to the Department of Foreign Languages, Faculty of Foreign Studies, Osaka University. As of 2018, the faculty members are Professor Yuko Fujimoto, who specializes in contemporary Iranian literature, Shin Takehara, who specializes in Iranian traditional literary culture, Jahedzadeh Shorbrag Behenam, who specializes in contrasting linguistics, and ancient Iranian languages. A specially appointed professor, Rezai Barkbidi Hassan, who specializes in culture and Sanskrit, belongs to this group. The faculty members are Professor Eijiro Doyama who specializes in Iranian philology, Kumi Kawada who specializes in Iranian history as a part-time professor, Toyoko Morita who specializes in Iranian regional studies as a part-time professor, and Yusuke Yoshida who specializes in human geography as a part-time professor. Classes cover a wide range of subjects, including not only Persian, but also social geography, Iranian history, and classical and modern literature. They also publish Persian self-study content and publish the magazine "Iranian Studies". The graduates have found employment in various companies and are actively using the Persian language. In 1980, the year after the Iranian Revolution, the Tokyo University of Foreign Studies opened the second Persian language department at a Japanese university. In 1993, the Persian Department of Tokyo Foreign Language University was reorganized into the Persian Department of the Middle East, and in 1995 it became the Persian Department of the South and West Asian Courses.

As of 2018, the faculty members are Professor Morio Fujii, who specializes in Persian literature and Mysticism literature, Associate Professor Ayano Sasaki, who specializes in Persian classical literature and Islamic mysticism, and specializes in linguistics and Iranian languages. Associate Professor Satoko Yoshie, Nasleen Shakybee-Momuters, who specializes in Persian literature, belongs to a specific foreign language as a chief teacher. In addition to Persian, she also teaches history and literature. Her modules are also available on the Internet. The only Japanese universities with Persian faculties and majors are Osaka University and Tokyo Foreign Language University, but Daito Bunka University Faculty of International Relations, Chuo University Faculty of Policy Studies, and the University of Tokyo offer Persian class as a second foreign language. Besides universities, there are opportunities to learn Persian in Japan. For example, the Cultural Center of Iran, attached to the Embassy of the Islamic Republic of Iran in Tokyo, offers Persian courses throughout the year.

=== Japanese language education in Iran ===
Japanese language education in Iran is centered around the University of Tehran. The Department of Japanese Language and Literature at the University of Tehran was established in 1994. In the university, with the cooperation of the Japan Foundation, Japanese language education has been provided through trial and error. In 1999, the curriculum was revised, which significantly increased the number of credits and class hours involved in beginner and intermediate-level learning. Since then, while making corrections, education that emphasizes the reliable acquisition of basic Japanese proficiency is being conducted.

=== Japanese Shia Muslims (Muslim) ===
The most famous Japanese Shia Muslim is Ebrahim Tatsuichi Sawada. He studied theology, law, logic, interpretation and politics at the Islamic School of Qom, a center of Shia learning, and became the first Japanese Shia imam to return to Japan in 1998. He is the Director of Research and Education at the Al-Mustafa International University of Religious Studies in Japan and has published a Japanese translation of the Qur'an.

== Arrests ==
In January 2026, following the 2025-2026 Iranian protests, reports emerged about the detention of Shin-Nosuke Kawashima, the head of the NHK office in Tehran, and his transfer to Evin Prison. The government of Japan confirmed the detention of one of its citizens in Tehran and stated that Tokyo authorities were in contact with the detainee and his family, demanding his swift release. Iranian officials have not yet officially confirmed the arrest. NHK stated that the safety of its staff is a priority, and no further information has been provided on the matter.

== Poll ==
According to a 2012 BBC World Service poll, only 4% of Japanese people view Iran's influence positively, with 52% expressing a negative view. According to a 2012 Pew Global Attitudes Survey, 15% of Japanese people viewed Iran favorably, compared to 76% which viewed it unfavorably; 94% of Japanese people oppose Iranian acquisition of nuclear weapons and 61% approve of "tougher sanctions" on Iran. Notably, only 40% support use of military force to prevent Iran from developing nuclear weapons, with 49% of Japanese accepting a nuclear-armed Iran, a higher percentage than any other surveyed country, including China, Russia and any Muslim nation.

== Resident diplomatic missions ==
- Iran has an embassy in Tokyo.
- Japan has an embassy in Tehran.

== See also ==
- Foreign relations of Iran
- Foreign relations of Japan
- Iranians in Japan
- List of Iranian artifacts abroad
