= Persian manuscript in Japan =

13th C. Persian inscription

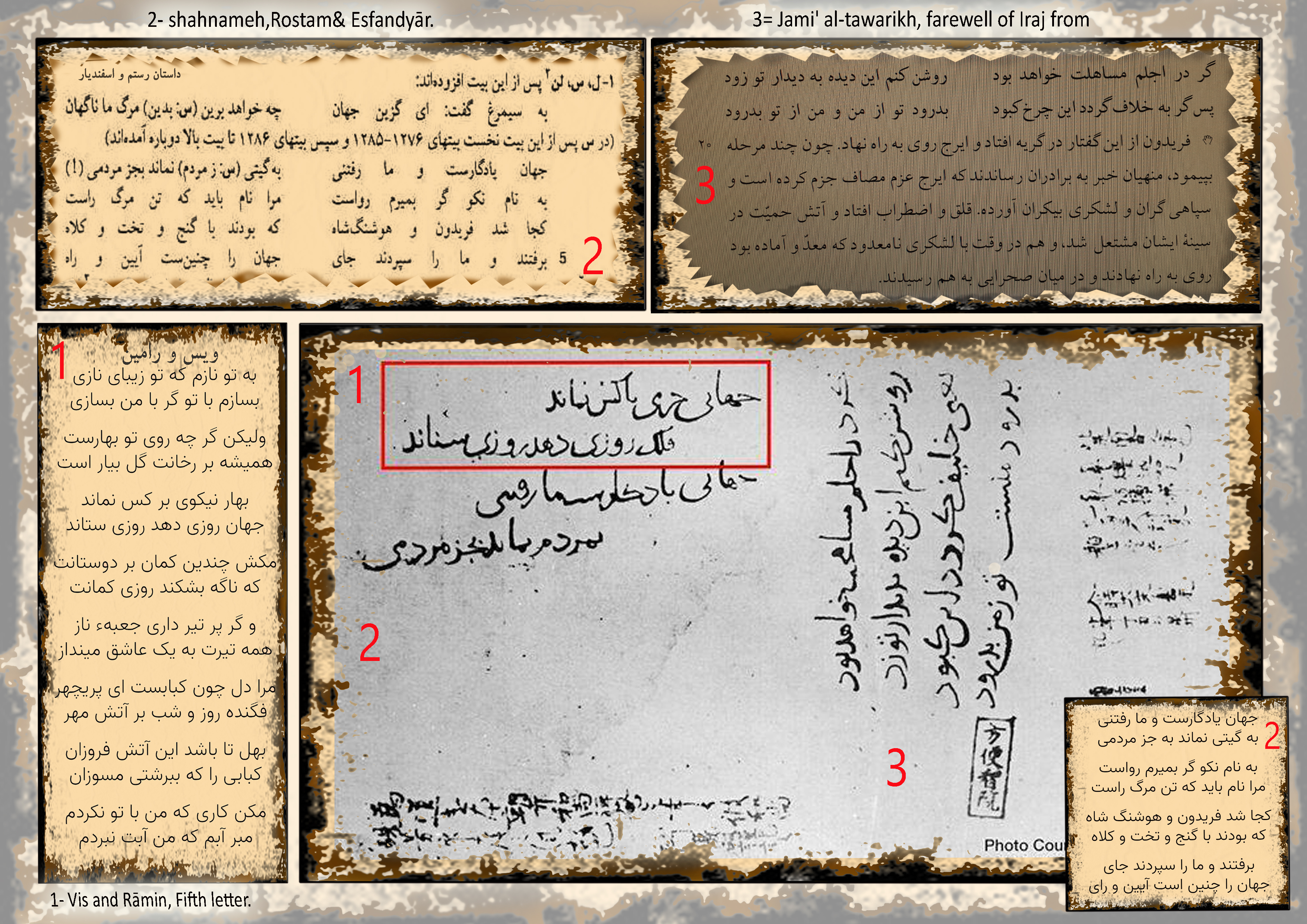
Persian manuscript in Japan, 1217 AD

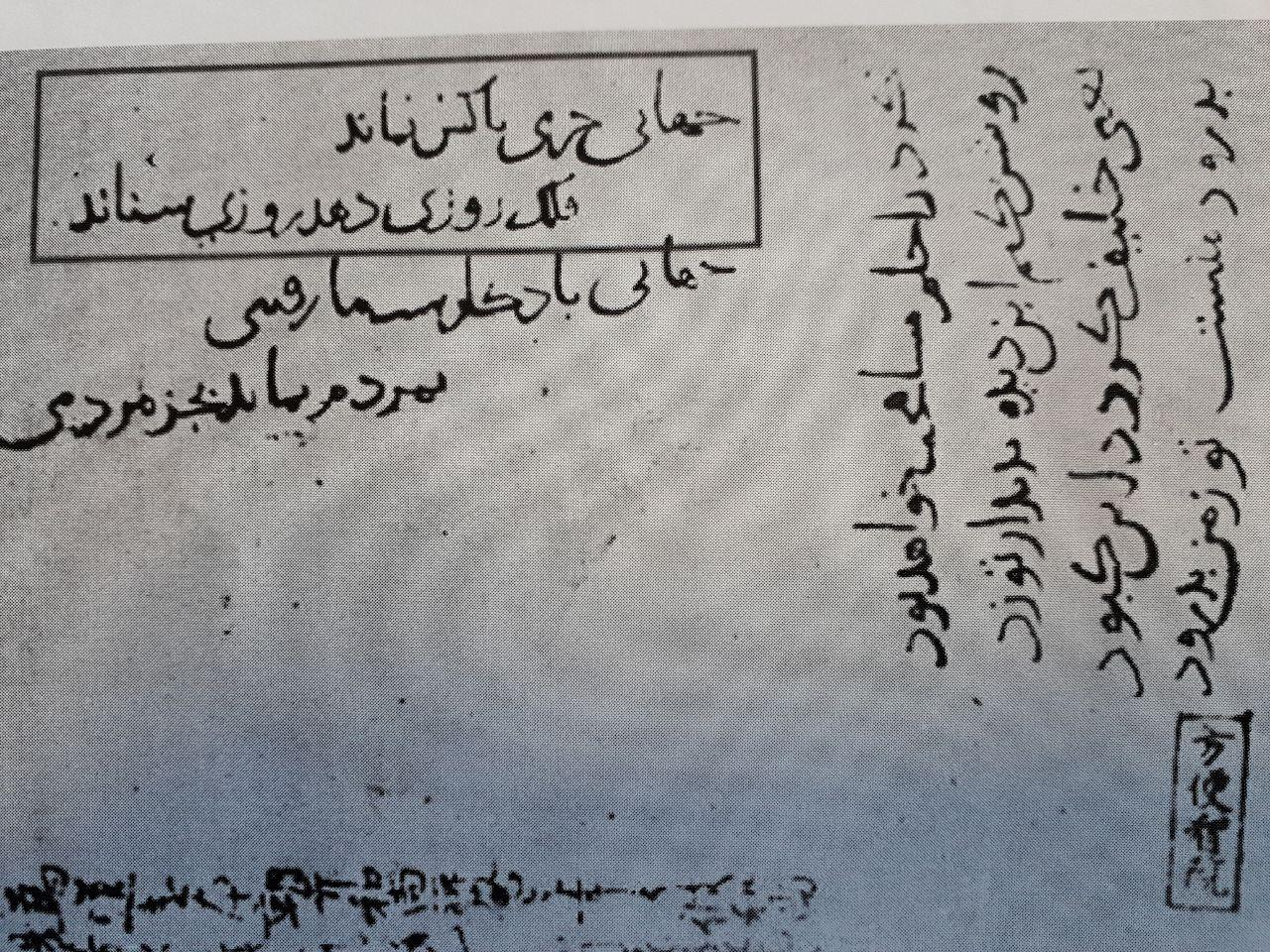
original

"Persian manuscript in Japan" (Japanese: 紙本墨書南番文字 Hepburn romanization: Shihonbokusho Nanban-Moji, Persian: دستخط پارسی ژاپن; also called "南蛮 Nanban") is a Persian inscription from 1217 AD that was written by a Persian in Quanzhou of China for a Japanese monk Keisei, a poem of Shahname Ferdusi. It is designated as a national important cultural property (artwork) in Japan. It is the oldest existing Persian document in Japan. The Persian manuscript in Japan had been written in 3 parts. It was a very famous poem in the Persian language. The first part is from Vis and Rāmin, the second part is from Shahnameh and the third part mentioned both in Jami' al-tawarikh and also shahnameh and it is sorrow farewell of Iraj from Fereydun.

== The poem ==
This inscription have been read and interpreted by many scholar but the second verse had translated in different ways. Dr. Mohammad Ajam, the author of the book Persian Inscriptions on Indian Monuments wrote: "Almost all the poems in this manuscript are readable and the meaning of the first four verses are clear. the poem had been very famous in Persian language in that time. the first part is also mentioned in Vis and Rāmin second part is mentioned in Shahnameh third part mentioned both in Jami' al-tawarikh and also shahnameh and it is sorrow farewell of Iraj from Fereydun. According to al-Ramhormuzi, Saadi Shirazi and Ibn Battuta it was a customary for sailors from Persian sea singing and chittering Persian poem Which is called the sailors anthem(soroud).Ibn Battuta had mentioned some verses of the poems he heard from Persian sailors in china port of Quanzhou. In the year 1345 Ibn Battuta arrived at Quanzhou in China's Fujian province, he met two prominent Persians, Burhan al-Din of Kazerun and Sharif al-Din from Tabriz (both of whom were influential figures noted in the Yuan History as "A-mi-li-ding" and "Sai-fu-ding", respectively). Ibn Battuta also wrote he had heard of "the rampart of Yajuj and Majuj" that was "sixty days' travel" from the city of Zeitun (Quanzhou); Hamilton Alexander Rosskeen Gibb notes that Ibn Battuta believed that the Great Wall of China was built by Dhul-Qarnayn to contain Gog and Magog as mentioned in the Quran. The problem of the poem was in the third verse because it was not clear and it was read by scholars in different ways. reading problem was in the word خلیف whether it was the name of the author or not and also word آس was reading as 'Aas" the sky" or as Daman or Das or this. but now it is clear that the poem is a famous poem of the fare well of Iraj from Fereydun and should be read as it is in the book of Jami' al-tawarikh page135.

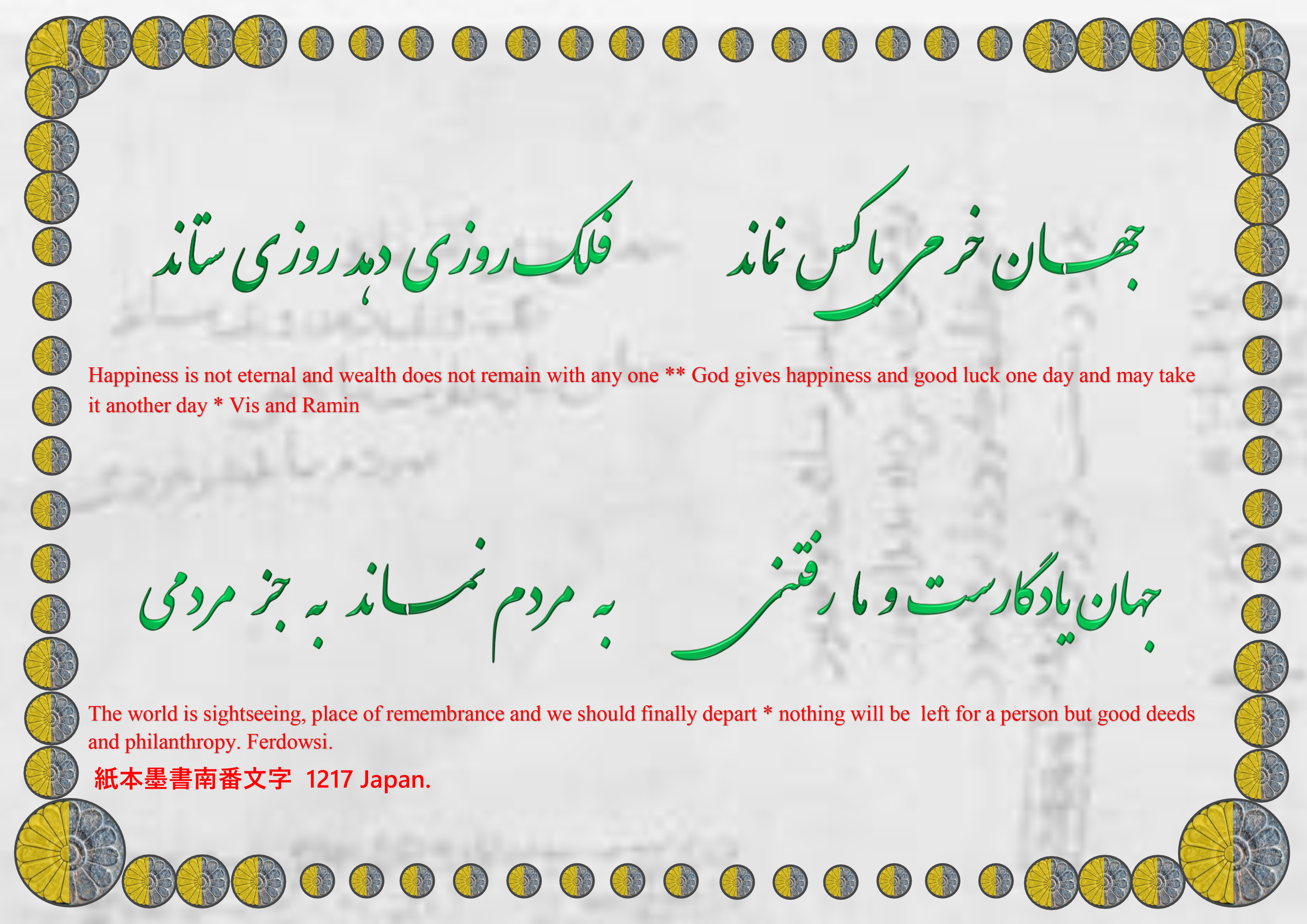
Reproducing the old Persian manuscript in Japan1

The First Poem

1. jahān-ē khorramī bā kas na-mānad
2. falak rūzī dehad, rūzī setānad
- Happiness is not eternal and wealth does not remain with any one ** Fate gives happiness and good luck one day and takes it back another day * vis and Ramin
1. jahān yādgār-ast mā raftanī
2. be-mardom na-mānad be-joz mardomī
- The world is sightseeing, place of remembrance and we should depart ** nothing will be left for a person but good deeds and philanthropy * Ferdowsi
- "The world is a memory, and we are all to depart, / Nothing will remain of man besides his noble deeds.

The Second Poem

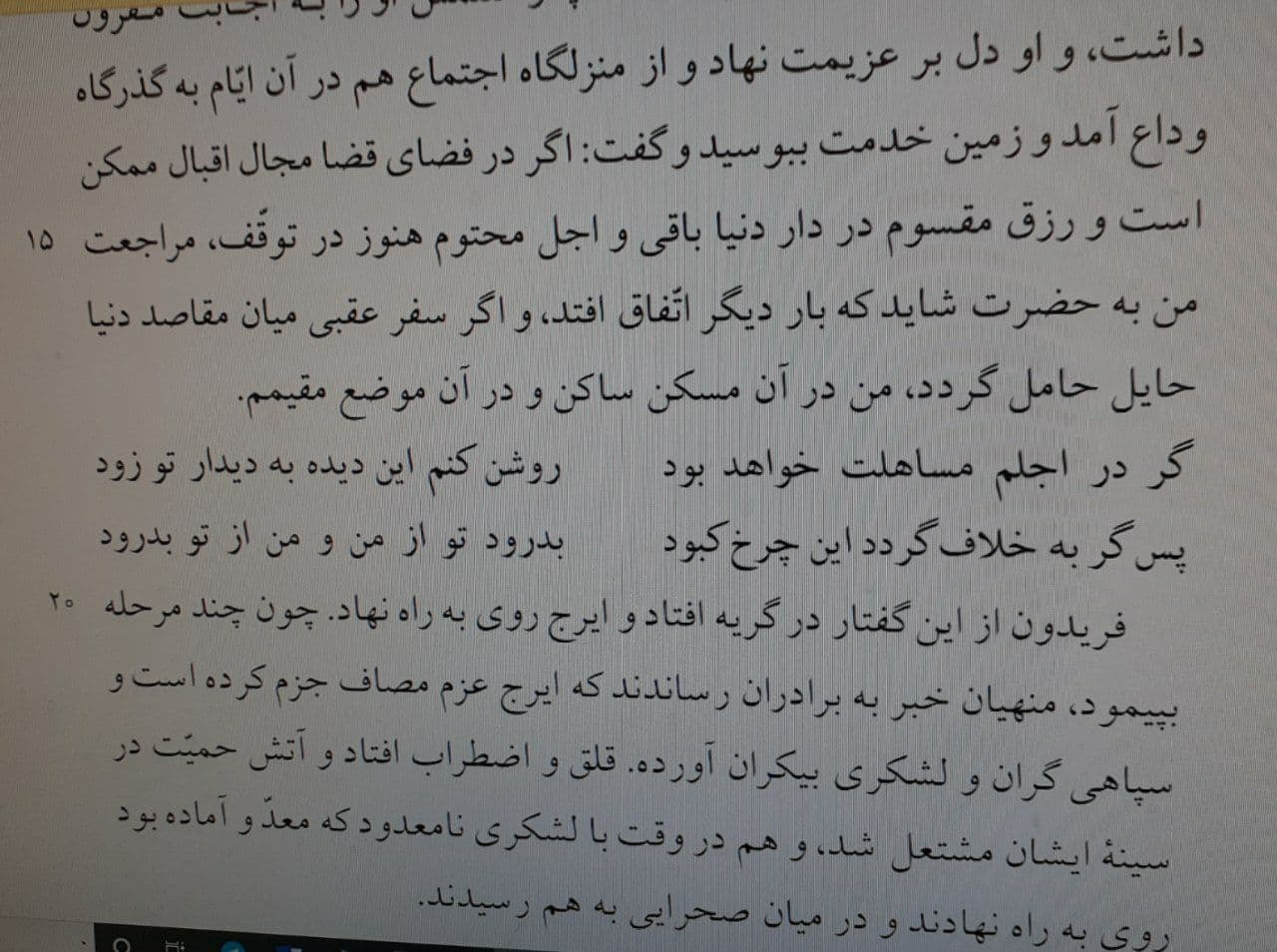
Jami' al-tawarikh page135 Fredon- Iraj farewell

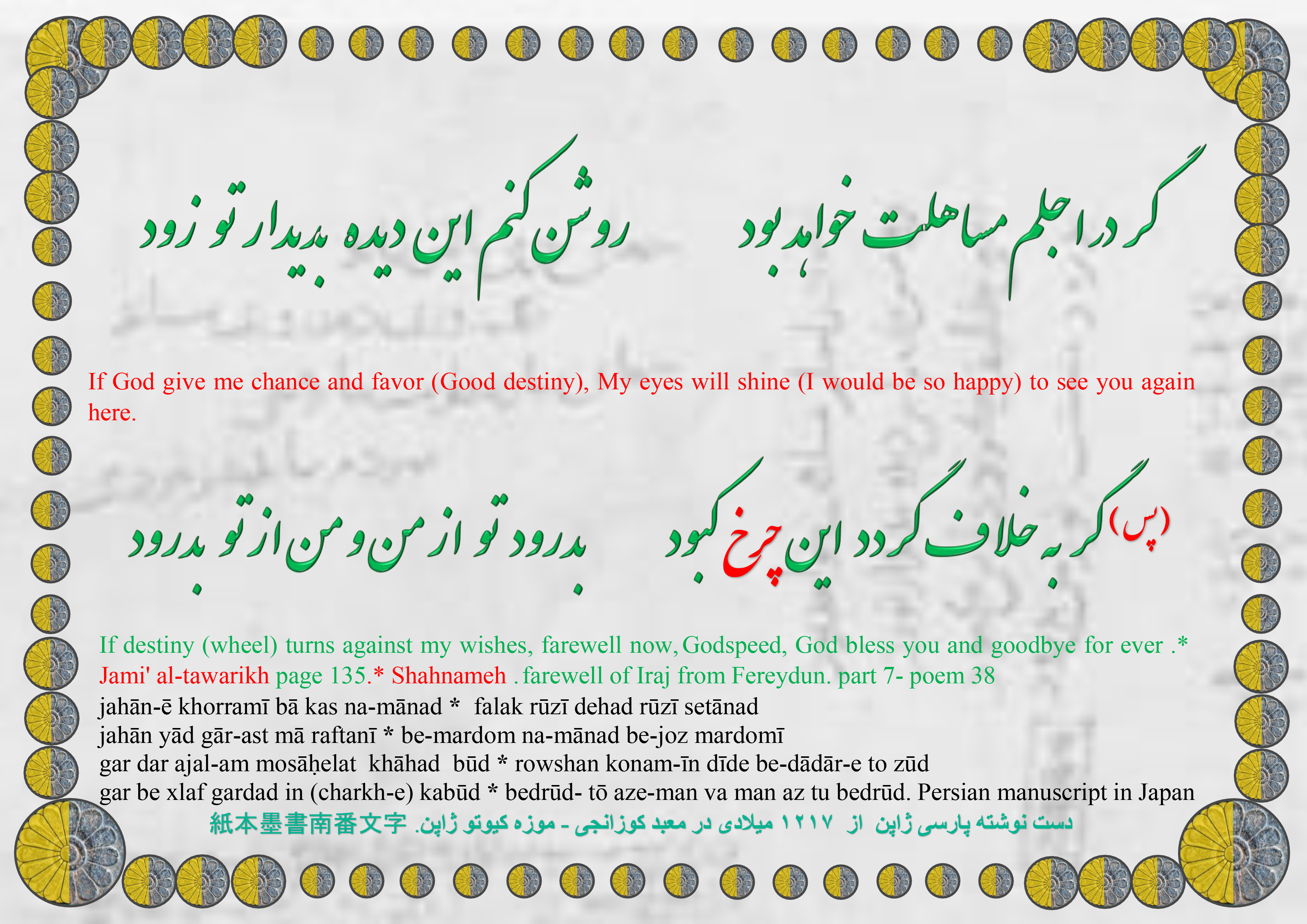
Re producing the old Persian manuscript in Japan B

1. gar dar ajal-am mosāmeḥat khāhad būd. If god is in my favor and my life was long
2. rowshan konam-īn dīde be-dīdār-e to z[ū]d. I will see you happily again.
3. Pas gar be khelaaf gardad in charkh e kaboud. if fate was not in my favor and my life was short.charkh e kaboud means the god of destiny
4. bedrūd-to az man- va man az tō bedrūd. I say sadly goodbye(bedrūd)

it means that I wish to see you again if god will we may see each other but if our destiny and god was not in our favor we will see each other in the heaven paradise. because of the dangerous journey most probably we will not see you again(bedrud) means a good by for ever.

- "If there be indulgence in regard to my life, / I shall brignten my eyes by looking on your face, / But if this blue (sky) were to turn against me, / You bid me farewell and I bid you the same."}}.
- "Hero will possess the mildness and benevolence, / Let my eyes brighten quickly by looking on your face, / That is to say, my companion has made my heart (eyes) blue, / This is my farewell; you, farewell from me."}} （1953）

But what is important is that writer refers to the spinning wheel and (Aas) the sky and the rotation of time and conveys the concept of death and going to heaven. He wished to see a Japanese person in heaven if his destiny is in a dangerous adventure. this sad Persian poem was reading in the old time when a person was to go in a long and dangerous journey. and say god by we will se each other (may be in sky and heaven) The equivalent of the Persian proverb, mountain does not reach to the mountain, but human can reach to each other the person and friend can find themselves even in other world.

== Research background ==
It was Toru Haneda, who first focused on this document and pointed out that it was a poem written in Persian in 1909 .in April 1910, Indian Abdul Hafiz Mohammad Barakehullah, who was a professor at the Tokyo School of Foreign Languages has been suggested that it may be a quotation from " Shahnameh " . However, the exact source was not determined .At about the same time Luo Zhenyu of the Qing dynasty also paid attention to this document, and in 1909, introduced the photo version in the 10th issue of the art magazine "Shinshu Kokumitsushu" published in Shanghai . Seeing this blurry photo version, Paul Pelliot of France, with the help of Clément Huart and Edward Denison Ross, " Journal Asiatique " July / August 1913 . In 1967, Emiko Okada, a Persian literary student studying at the University of Tehran, introduced a photo version to Iranian researchers. Tsuneo Kuroyanagi, a Persian literary writer, found that the latter two lines of the first sentence were quoted from King Shahnameh's reign of King Gostersp, and held Ferdowsi International in Mashhad, Iran in July 1977. This fact was introduced in "Ferdowsi's View of Fate in Shahnameh" presented at the conference . In 1988, Emiko Okada was translating the tragic love story "Vis and Ramin" by the 11th century poet Fakhruddin Asad Gurgani, with the first two lines of the first sentence Found to be a quote from "Vis and Ramin" Chapter 77. The source of the second sentence has long been debated . Paleographer Minahiko Ogino speculated that it was an anecdote of Omar Khayyam 's " Rubaiyat " because it was a quatrain in the Rubai style, but Tsuneo Kuroyanagi said that the prosody was broken. finally in 2020 it was revealed that the last verses belong to the Jami' al-tawarikh page 135.

== See also ==
- Persian Inscriptions on Indian Monuments
- Hyōtō Ryūkyū-koku ki, a work written by Keisei
