= Withdrawal of United States troops from Iraq (2020–2021) =

Withdrawal of American military forces from Iraq
- Part of the US-led intervention in Iraq (2014–2021)
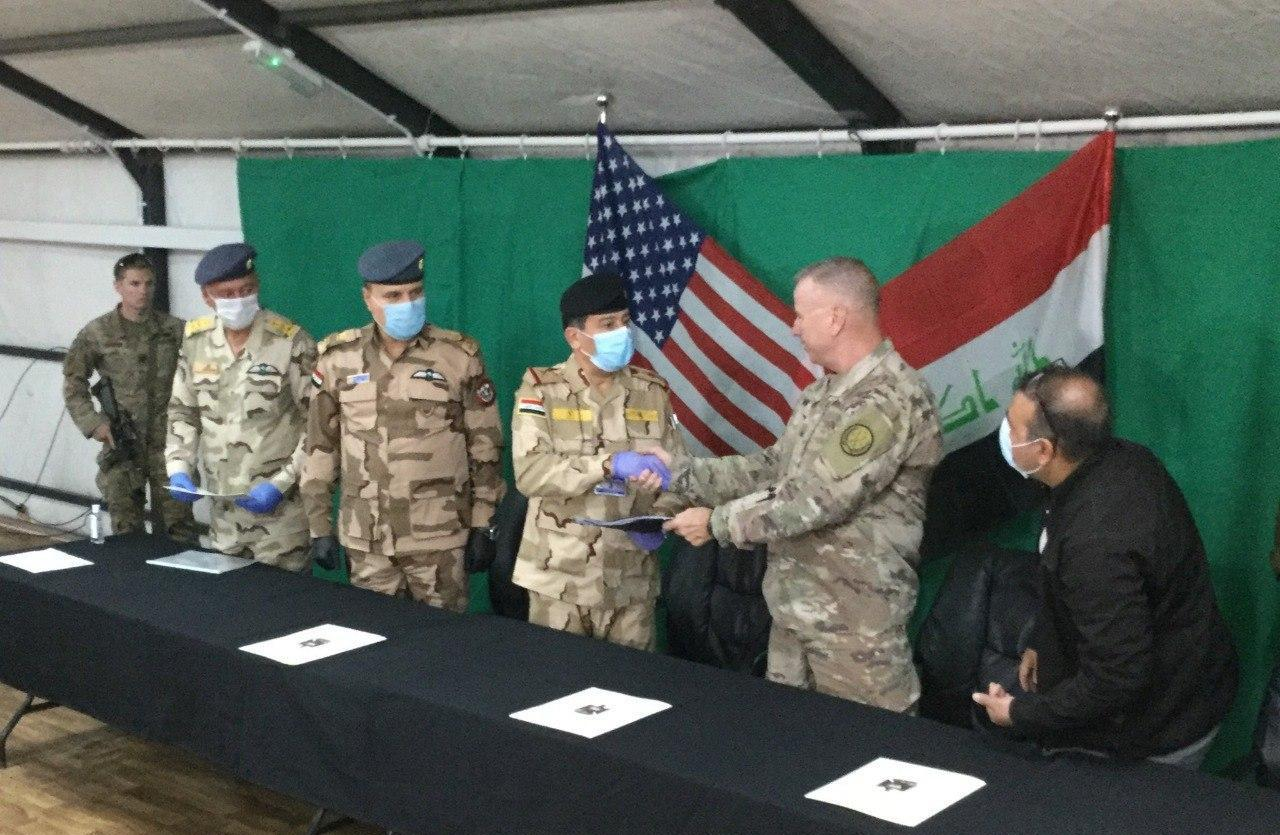
- CJTF-OIR transfer of Qayyarah Airfield West to Iraqi security forces, March 2020
Date	20 March 2020 – 9 December 2021 (1 year, 8 months, 2 weeks and 5 days)
Location	Iraq
Result	Presence of US troops in Iraq minimized; End of US combat mission in Iraq

After the defeat of the Islamic State in Iraq in 2017, Iraq and the United States began discussing the partial withdrawal of American combat troops from Iraq in December 2019. In January 2020, during massive protests in Iraq, and following the assassination of Iranian commander Qasem Soleimani with a U.S. reaper drone ordered by President Trump, the Iraqi Council of Representatives passed a non-binding measure to "expel all foreign troops from their country," including American and Iranian troops. The American Trump administration ignored the motion, but later began a partial drawdown of forces in March. U.S. combat troops have since accelerated their withdrawal from Iraq.

In July 2021, President Joe Biden announced that he would end the U.S. combat mission in Iraq by the end of 2021, with remaining U.S. troops serving in an advisory and assistance role. The U.S. combat mission formally concluded on 9 December 2021, with 2,500 U.S. troops remaining in the country. As of March 15, 2023, the number of American forces in Iraq was still approximately 2,500 soldiers, deployed mainly in Baghdad and the north of the country.

== Background ==
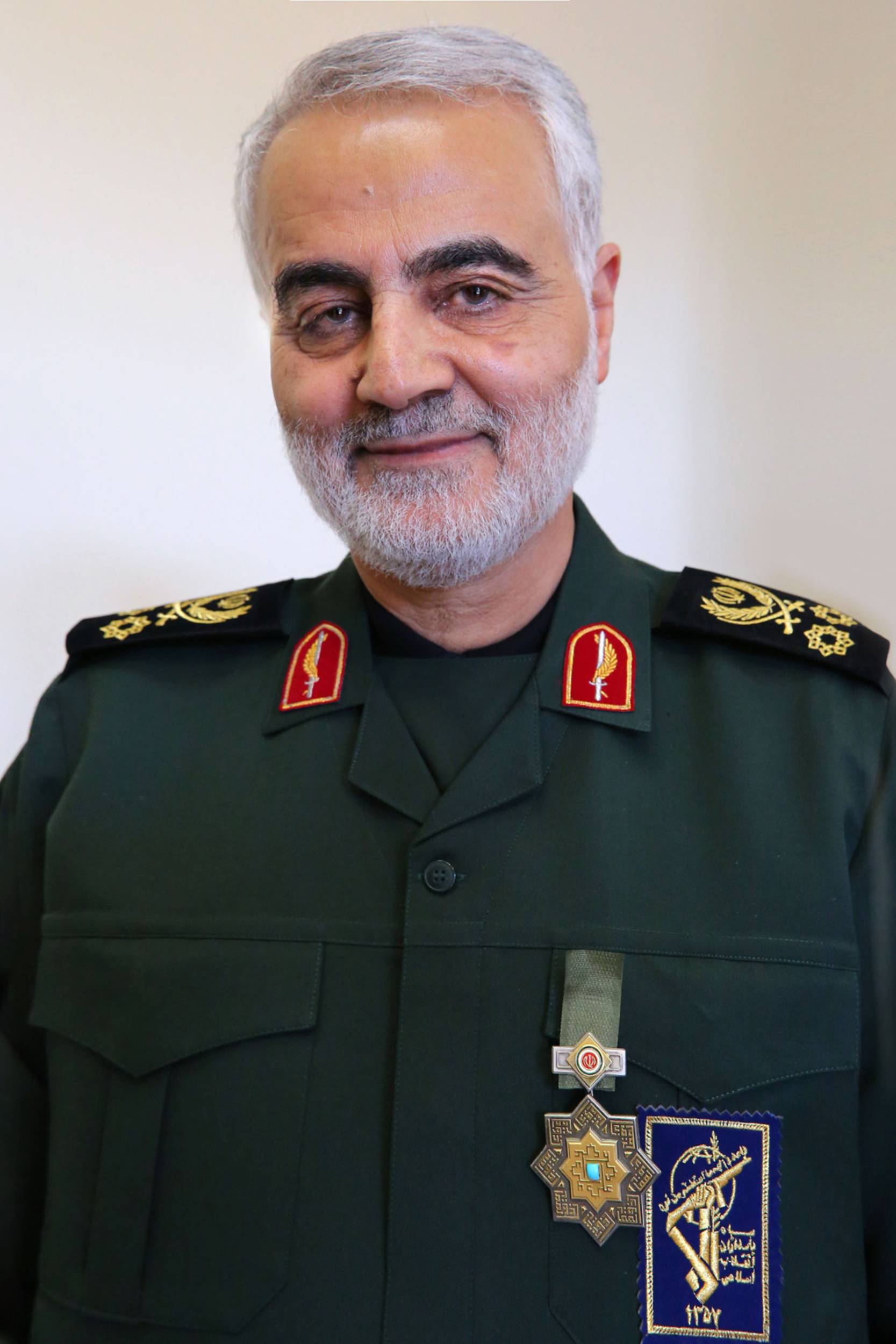
Iraq denounced the January 2020 killing of Iranian general Qasem Soleimani by the United States as a violation of its sovereignty.

The United States completed its prior withdrawal of troops in December 2011, concluding the Iraq War. In June 2014, the United States formed Combined Joint Task Force – Operation Inherent Resolve (CJTF-OIR) and re-intervened at the request of the Iraqi government due to the rise of the Islamic State of Iraq and the Levant (ISIL). Iran also intervened in Iraq in June 2014. On 9 December 2017, Iraq declared victory against ISIL, concluding the 2013–2017 War in Iraq and commencing the latest ISIL insurgency in Iraq.

In May 2019, four merchant ships were attacked by limpet mines in the Gulf of Oman. Tensions rose between the United States and the Islamic Republic of Iran, after the United States blamed Iran's Islamic Revolutionary Guard Corps for the incident. In June 2019, a nearly-identical incident occurred involving two merchant ships. In December 2019, the United States began discussing with Iraq about plans to withdraw from certain bases. That same month, the K-1 Air Base was attacked, resulting in one American fatality and six injuries. The United States claimed that Kata'ib Hezbollah, an Iranian proxy group, was responsible for the attack. The United States responded by conducting airstrikes in Iraq and Syria against Kata'ib Hezbollah locations.

On 31 December 2019 through 1 January 2020, the United States Embassy in Baghdad was attacked in response to the airstrikes. On 3 January 2020, the United States conducted an airstrike that killed Iranian Major General Qasem Soleimani and Kata'ib Hezbollah commander Abu Mahdi al-Muhandis. Iraq protested that the airstrike violated their sovereignty.

In March 2020, the U.S.-led coalition, Combined Joint Task Force – Operation Inherent Resolve (CJTF–OIR), began transferring control over a number of military installations back to Iraqi security forces, citing developments in the multi-year mission against the Islamic State of Iraq and the Levant (ISIL). By 4 April 2020, four bases had been transferred. The base transfers and withdrawal were accelerated due to the COVID-19 pandemic in Iraq and the threat of Iranian proxy elements.

In February 2021, NATO announced it would expand its mission to train Iraqi forces in their fight against ISIL, partially reversing the U.S.-led troop withdrawals. In April 2021, U.S. Central Command stated that there were no plans for a total withdrawal of U.S. forces from Iraq, citing continued threats posed by the ISIL insurgency and Iran-backed militias.

== Withdrawal ==
=== January 2020: Non-binding Iraqi vote for troop withdrawal ===
If they do ask us to leave, if we don't do it in a very friendly basis, we will charge them sanctions like they've never seen before ever. It'll make Iranian sanctions look somewhat tame.

— U.S. President Donald Trump, 3 January 2020

On 5 January 2020, the Council of Representatives of Iraq voted to obligate Iraq's government "to work towards ending the presence of all foreign troops on Iraqi soil." It was initially unclear if the resolution was binding and no timetable for withdrawal was set. Qais Khazali, leader of Iranian proxy group Asa'ib Ahl al-Haq, stated "If [US troops] don't leave, then they will be considered occupation forces." U.S. president Donald Trump threatened to impose sanctions on Iraq in response to the vote. According to a letter sent by a senior U.S. commander to Iraqi officials on 6 January 2020, "the United States may be preparing to withdraw its troops", but after a while Chairman of the Joint Chiefs Gen. Mark Milley, announced that it was a draft sent by "honest mistake."

On 8 January 2020, Iran launched "Operation Martyr Soleimani", conducting missile strikes against U.S. troops stationed in Iraq. 110 U.S. military personnel suffered from traumatic brain injuries. The United States responded by insisting that its troops would stay in Iraq. Speaking on the withdrawal, Trump stated "At some point, we want to get out. But this isn’t the right point." Two days later, Abdul-Mahdi reiterated that all foreign troops must withdraw from Iraq, including Iran. On 24 January 2020, Iraqi demonstrators marched to demand that the U.S. withdraw its troops. Due to security concerns, some NATO countries including Canada, Germany, Croatia and Slovakia said they were concluding their training missions and pulling troops out of Iraq, at least temporarily.

=== March – May 2020: Base transfers and COVID-19 pandemic ===
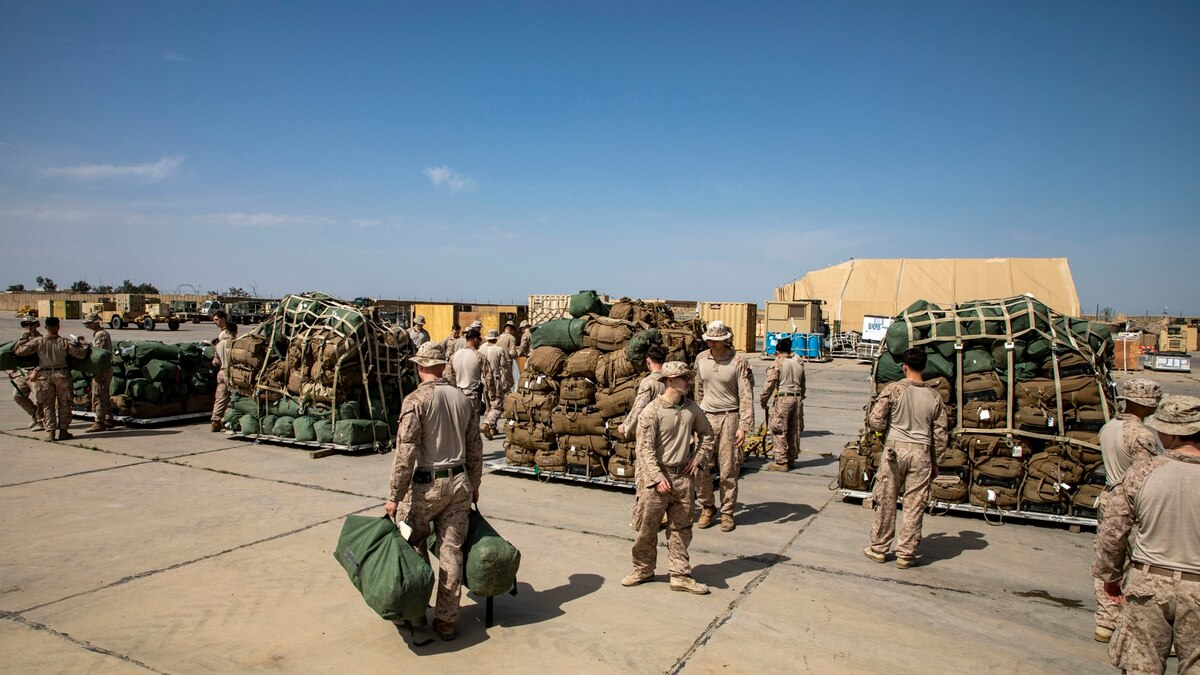
Marines of 2nd Battalion, 7th Marines packing up gear to withdraw from Al-Taqaddum Air Base, 24 March 2020

On 11 March and 14 March 2020, Camp Taji was attacked, supposedly by Kata'ib Hezbollah, killing three Coalition personnel. The United States responded to the first attack on Camp Taji by targeting five Kata'ib Hezbollah weapon storage facilities with air strikes. On 19 March 2020, the al-Qaim base near the Iraq–Syria border was transferred from the coalition to Iraqi security forces. Iraqi major general Tahsin Khafaji stated "This is the first step of US troops withdrawing from Iraq." On 20 March 2020, CJTF-OIR confirmed that certain troops would be withdrawing from Iraq due to the COVID-19 pandemic. On that same day, United States Central Command ordered a 14-day "stop movement" preventing any U.S. troops from entering or leaving Iraq and Afghanistan because of the pandemic.

The U.S. Army left the Qayyarah Airfield West on 26 March. The third base, K-1 Air Base, to be transferred by the United States was near Kirkuk. On 4 April 2020, the coalition transferred the Al-Taqaddum Air Base, making it the fourth base to be transferred to Iraqi forces. ISIL had planned to take advantage of the vacuum in the Syrian Desert caused by the coronavirus-expedited withdrawal of U.S. troops. In an April 2020 news release, CJTF-OIR reiterated that the base transfers were pre-planned and "are not related to recent attacks against Iraqi bases hosting Coalition troops, or the ongoing COVID-19 situation in Iraq." However, an inspector general report released in May 2020 admitted that though the base transfers were planned ahead of time, they were accelerated due to the threat of Iranian proxies and the pandemic.

=== June 2020 – January 2021: American–Iraqi "strategic dialogue" ===
By June 2020, the Iraqi government had yet to act on the January parliamentary resolution to call for the departure of foreign troops, and the Iraqi military was reportedly reluctant to have U.S. forces leave altogether. On 1 June Spain announced its intentions to withdraw from its primary base in Iraq by the end of July. The United States and Iraq scheduled new negotiations regarding military, political, and economic cooperation for June. Strategic-level security dialogue between the two countries last occurred in 2018. On 9 June 2020, prior to the start of the dialogue, a rocket attack against U.S. troops in Baghdad International Airport concluded with no injuries. The Iraqi-U.S. negotiations began on June 11 and were to be conducted virtually and expected to continue for months. The negotiations began amid continued tensions with Iran and a resurgence of ISIL attacks. According to The New York Times, the ISIL insurgency began to intensify by mid-2020, partially due to Iraqi security forces diverting resources to enforce curfews and lock downs due to the COVID-19 pandemic.

The anti-ISIL coalition transferred control of Besmaya Camp to Iraqi forces on 25 July 2020. The base was largely used by Spanish forces to train Iraqi troops and was the seventh military installation handed over to the Iraqi government in 2020.

On 23 August, U.S. troops withdrew from Taji Base and handed it over to Iraqi security forces. On 28 August, a U.S. official said that the U.S. was expected to reduce troops by a third from 5,200 to 3,500. On 9 September, the U.S. military said it will reduce its troops in Iraq from 5,200 to 3,000.

=== February 2021 – April 2021: Expanded NATO training and continued security dialogue ===
By January 2021, the U.S. had reduced its presence to 2,500 troops in Iraq. Moreover, Christopher C. Miller, the former acting Defense Secretary, noted that even with the reduced presence, they "will continue to have a counterterrorism platform in Iraq to support partner forces with air power and intelligence".

On 15 February, two people were killed and an additional 13 were injured (including an American service member) following a rocket attack on the U.S.-led coalition's base in Erbil by a suspected Iranian-backed militia.

On 18 February, NATO Secretary-General Jens Stoltenberg announced that the alliance will expand its mission to train Iraqi security forces (ISF) at the request of the Iraqi government. Stoltenberg said NATO will gradually increase personnel in the country from 500 to 4,000 and expand its presence to more facilities beyond the Baghdad area. The Pentagon reportedly welcomed NATO's decision, but it remained unclear at the time whether the U.S. would reverse its withdrawal and commit personnel under the NATO initiative.

On 23 March, the Iraqi government formally requested a resumption of bilateral security dialogue with the U.S., taking place in April. The dialogue was the third session of Iraqi-U.S. strategic talks, in which the first and second happened in June and August 2020 respectively, and the first session under the Biden administration. The U.S. was expected to argue for continued coalition forces presence in the country with the task of training Iraqi forces "at the invitation of the Iraqi government" and combating the ISIL insurgency. U.S. officials nonetheless reportedly supported a scheduled future withdrawal of forces from Iraq at an unspecified date.

After the third round of "strategic dialogue" concluded on 7 April, the U.S.-led coalition confirmed it would continue training and advising the Iraqi military while withdrawing combat forces from the country, citing "increasing capacity of the ISF", with a timetable forthcoming. Iraqi security officials agreed that a limited coalition presence was necessary to keep ISIL underground, despite continued pressure from Iran-backed militias to oust all coalition forces. On 22 April, USCENTOM commander General "Frank" McKenzie welcomed NATO's planned expanded role in the country and denied the prospect of an approaching total withdrawal of U.S. forces from Iraq, saying "we're going to stay in Iraq" to "finish the ISIS fight" at the behest of the Iraqi government. McKenzie also cited the continued threat Iran-backed militias posed to the coalition and affirmed his belief that ousting U.S. forces and their allies from the region was a foreign policy goal of Iran.

=== July 2021 – December 2021: End of U.S. combat mission ===
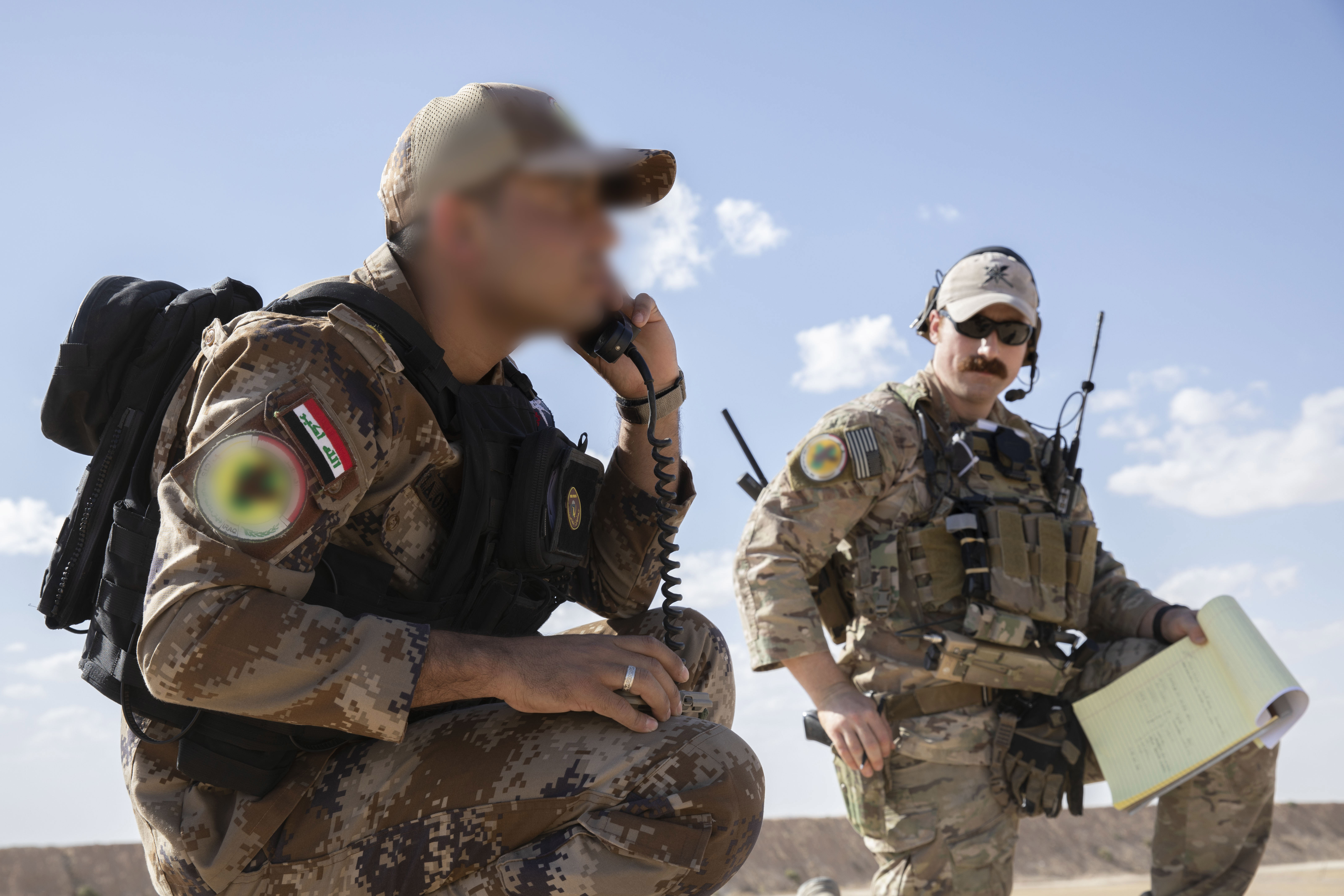
A coalition JTAC training alongside Iraqi Tactical Attack Controllers (ITACs) from the Counter Terrorism Services near Al Asad Airbase, 19 October 2021

On 26 July 2021, during Iraqi Prime Minister Mustafa Al-Kadhimi's visit to the White House during the fourth and final round of "strategic dialogue", U.S. president Joe Biden announced that the American combat mission in Iraq would conclude by the end of the year and that the remaining U.S. troops in the country would shift to an advisory role, "to be available to continue to train, to assist, to help, and to deal with ISIS". The move reportedly came at the urging of the Iraqi government and was not regarded as a major change by observers, as the U.S. already focused much of its efforts on training and assisting Iraqi security forces.

It was reported on 8 October that American combat forces had begun to be withdrawn from Iraq, according to an Iraqi Army spokesman.

On 9 December, Iraq and the U.S.-led coalition announced that the coalition's combat mission had concluded, formally transitioning remaining U.S. forces in the country to an advisory, assistance, and training role. Coalition commander Maj. Gen. John Brennan stated "Many brave men and women gave their lives to ensure Daesh never returns, and as we complete our combat role, we will remain here to advise, assist and enable," adding "Daesh is down, but not out." Around 2,500 U.S. troops remained in Iraq at the time of the announcement, and soldiers had not engaged in combat missions since early 2020. CENTCOM commander Gen. "Frank" McKenzie confirmed that U.S. troops would remain in Iraq to assist Iraqi security forces, including providing air support and military aid.

As regional tensions over the 2023 Gaza war rise, there have been at least 14 drone and rocket attacks on American personnel in Iraq since October 7, 2023.

== See also ==
- Withdrawal of United States troops from Afghanistan (2020–2021)
- U.S.–Iraq Status of Forces Agreement
- List of United States military installations in Iraq
