= Iran–United States relations during the first Trump administration =

Iran–United States relations

- Iran: United States

Diplomatic mission
- Interests Section in the Pakistani Embassy, Washington, D.C.: Interests Section in the Swiss Embassy, Tehran

Envoy
- Director of the Interest Section Mehdi Atefat: United States Special Representative for Iran Abram Paley

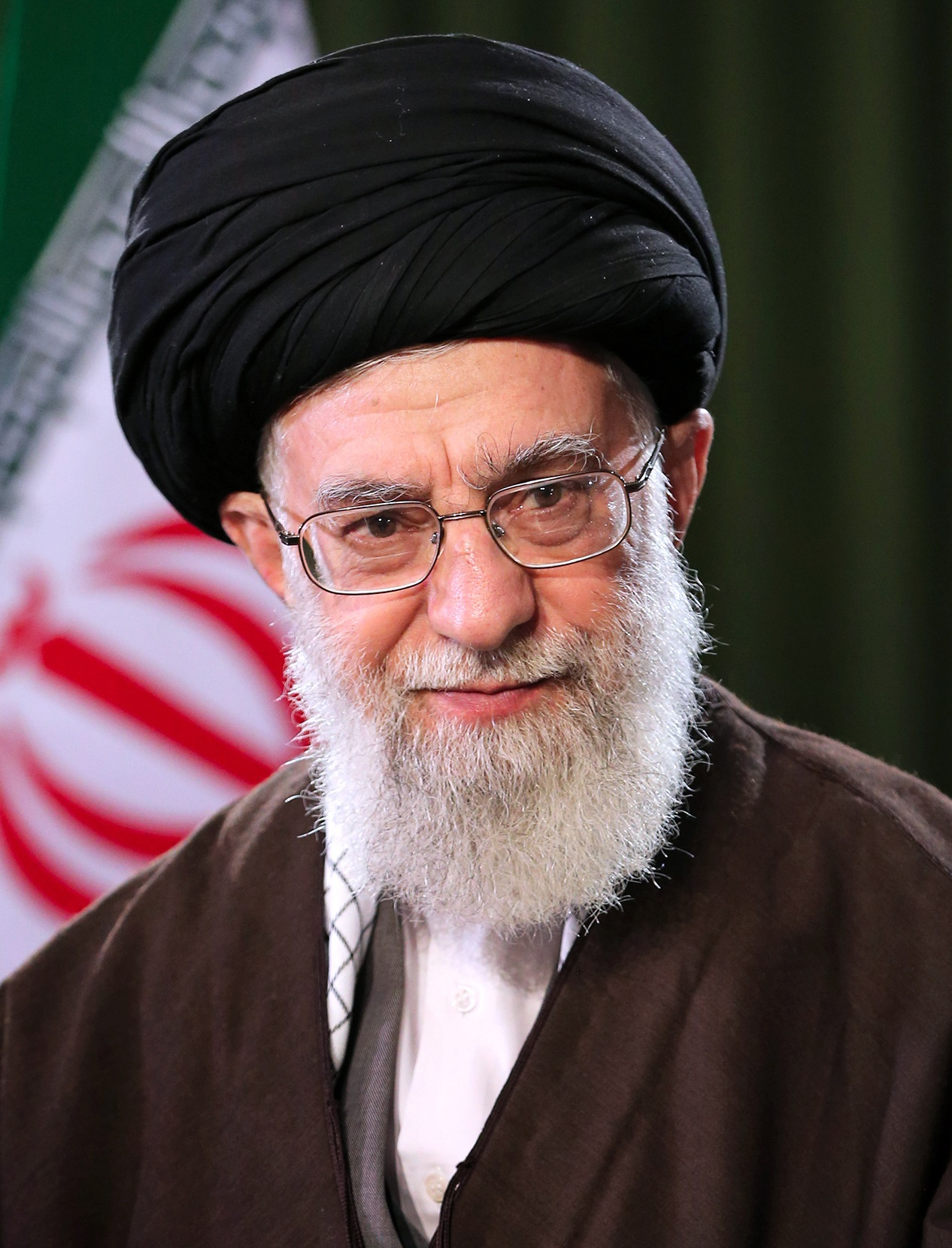
Ali Khamenei

Donald Trump

Iran–United States relations during the first Trump administration (2017–2021) were marked by a sharp policy shift from Obama's engagement-oriented approach. Trump began with a travel ban affecting Iranian citizens, and withdrew from the Joint Comprehensive Plan of Action (JCPOA). A broader maximum pressure campaign followed, with over 1,500 sanctions targeting Iran’s financial, oil, and shipping sectors, as well as foreign firms doing business with Iran, severely damaging its economy. The effort aimed to isolate Iran but met with strong resistance—even from U.S. allies—and often left Washington diplomatically isolated.

Iran responded by threatening to resume unrestricted uranium enrichment; rejecting negotiations with the Trump administration, and intensified rhetoric. Tensions escalated in 2019 with U.S. intelligence reports of Iranian threats, attacks on oil tankers, the downing of a U.S. drone by Iran, and suspected Iranian strikes on Saudi oil facilities. President Trump called off retaliatory strikes, opting for cyberattacks and additional sanctions instead.

A major escalation followed a December 2019 rocket attack on the K-1 Air Basein Iraq, which led to American airstrikes on Iranian-backed militias and a retaliatory attack on the U.S. embassy in Baghdad. On 3 January 2020, the U.S. assassinated Iranian General Qasem Soleimani in a drone strike, prompting Iranian missile attacks on U.S. bases in Iraq and heightened fears of war. The crisis deepened with the accidental downing of a Ukrainian passenger plane by Iranian forces and continued through early 2020 with retaliatory strikes and threats.

Later in 2020, Iran blamed U.S. sanctions for limiting its COVID-19 response. They launched a military satellite, and were later accused of interfering in the U.S. presidential election and proxy attacks. Relations ended under Trump with continued hostility and unresolved disputes.

== State of Iran-U.S. relations in January 2017 ==
At the outset of the first Trump administration in January 2017, Iran was led by President Hassan Rouhani, a centrist cleric who had previously championed the 2015 nuclear deal (JCPOA) and advocated for improved relations with the West, while ultimate authority rested with Supreme Leader Ali Khamenei, who held decisive power over Iran’s foreign and security policies. Relations between Iran and the United States were marked by cautious diplomacy following the 2015 nuclear agreement (JCPOA), but strained by ongoing U.S. sanctions, ballistic missile disputes, and regional tensions, with no formal diplomatic ties since 1980.

Already during his presidential campaign, Trump maintained that "Iran is now the dominant Islamic power in the Middle East and on the road to nuclear weapons." He opposed the JCPOA, calling it "terrible" and claiming that the Obama administration negotiated the agreement "from desperation." He also described the agreement as a disaster that could lead to a nuclear holocaust. Although at one point he stated he would attempt to enforce the deal rather than abrogate it, he also told AIPAC in March 2016 that his "number-one priority is to dismantle the disastrous deal with Iran."

== Initial steps ==
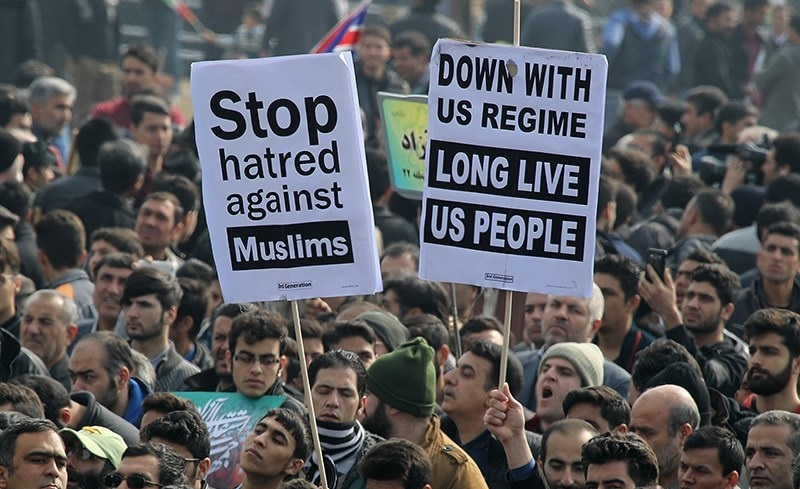
38th anniversary of the 1979 Revolution in Azadi square, Tehran, 2017

One of the Trump administration’s first major actions affecting Iran came on 27 January 2017, when citizens of Iran and several other countries were temporarily banned from entering the United States by the executive order "Protecting the Nation From Foreign Terrorist Entry Into the United States". It barred Iranian citizens and individuals suspected of Iranian nationality from entering the U.S., including Iranian passport holders, except for transit. All passengers and crew, regardless of nationality, were required to ensure their passports contained no Iranian entry stamps. There are no direct flights between Iran and the USA so all travel must transit through a third country, and no Iranian aircraft may enter USA airspace.

Ali Khamenei publicly and repeatedly "banned" any negotiations with the United States

The Trump White House announced that it was putting Iran "on notice" following its ballistic missile tests on January 29, 2017, just days after taking office. Days later, the Trump administration imposed sanctions on 25 Iranian individuals and companies suspected of involvement in Iran's missile program, calling these "initial steps".

The Trump administration was seen as moving to strengthen an informal coalition with Saudi Arabia, Israel, the United Arab Emirates and other Sunni Gulf states, aimed at countering Iran's regional influence. Between January and late July 2017, Twitter had identified and shut down over 7,000 accounts created by Iranian influence operations.

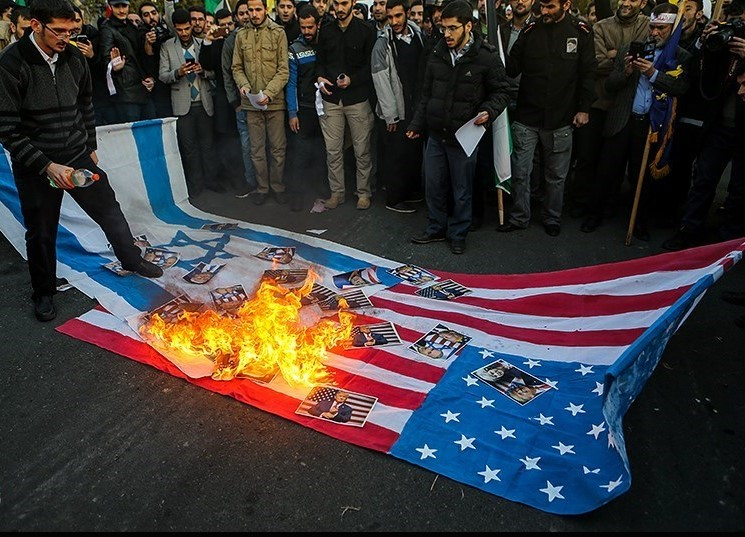
Protest against Trump's recognition of Jerusalem as capital of Israel, Tehran, 11 December 2017

The Trump administration stated that Trump personally lobbied dozens of European officials against doing business with Iran during the May 2017 Brussels summit; this likely violated the terms of the JCPOA, which prohibits policies "specifically intended to directly and adversely affect the normalization of trade and economic relations with Iran." Both in April and in July 2017, the Trump administration certified in July 2017 that Iran had upheld its end of the agreement.In April 2017, the Trump administration certified that Iran was in compliance with the JCPOA.

In July 2017, the vast majority of congressional Democrats and Republicans voted in favor of the Countering America's Adversaries Through Sanctions Act (CAATSA) that grouped together sanctions against Iran, Russia and North Korea. On 2 August 2017, Iranian Deputy Foreign Minister Abbas Araqchi stated that, "In our view the nuclear deal has been violated". In September 2017, speaking to the UN General Assembly, the countries′ presidents exchanged offensive remarks and expressed opposing views on the JCPOA.

== Withdrawal from nuclear agreement and maximum pressure campaign ==
President Trump announces the United States withdrawal from the Iran nuclear deal, May 8, 2018

In May 2018, Donald Trump decided to pull out of the JCPOA, announcing he would reimpose economic sanctions on Iran effective from 4 November that year. This marked the beginning of the Trump administration's maximum pressure campaign, an effort to force Iran to renegotiate the nuclear agreement by imposing intensified sanctions. The administration aimed to expand the deal to include stricter limitations on Iran's nuclear program as well as new restrictions on its ballistic missile development and regional activities.

In response, Iranian president Hassan Rouhani said that if needed he would "begin our industrial enrichment without any limitations". On 5 July, Iran threatened to close off the Strait of Hormuz if U.S. decided to re-impose oil sanctions on Iran following US withdrawal from the JCPOA.

In late July 2018, against the backdrop of a harsh exchange of threats between the presidents of the U.S. and Iran, a large tanker flying a Saudi flag and transporting some 2 million barrels of oil to Egypt was struck in the Bab-el-Mandeb strait near the port of Hodeida by the Houthi rebels in Yemen, believed to be armed and financed by Iran. The incident, which made Saudi Arabia halt oil shipments through the strait, was seen by analysts as greatly escalating tensions. It was reported that the Trump administration was conducting a program to foment various opposition groups in Iran.

On 13 August 2018, Iranian Supreme leader Ayatollah Ali Khamenei banned direct talks with U.S., referring to the failure of the previous ones. "There will be no war, nor will we negotiate with the US" and "Even if we ever—impossible as it is—negotiated with the US, it would never ever be with the current US administration," Khamenei said. He added that the United States never budges on the primary goal they pursue in negotiations, which are normally based on give and take, and "reneges on its own end of the bargain" after the negotiation. U.S. Secretary of State Mike Pompeo formed the Iran Action Group as a dedicated group to coordinate and run U.S. policy toward Iran. In November 2018, all the sanctions removed in 2015 were re-imposed on Iran by the Trump administration.

In October 2018 the International Court of Justice provisionally ordered the United States to cancel its sanctions against Iran, relying on the 1955 Treaty of Amity. In response, the United States withdrew from the treaty.

In November 2018, the Trump administration officially reinstated all sanctions against Iran that were previously lifted before the U.S. withdrew from the JCPOA.

Contradicting the administration's previous statements, a January 2019 U.S. intelligence community assessment concluded that Iran was not pursuing nuclear weapons.

In May 2019, the International Atomic Energy Agency certified that Iran was abiding by the main terms of the Iran nuclear deal, although questions were raised on how many advanced centrifuges Iran was allowed to have, as that was only loosely defined in the deal.

On 7 March 2019, Acting U.S. ambassador to the United Nations Jonathan Cohen, in a letter to Secretary-General António Guterres, urged the United Nations to put new sanctions on Iran for its new missile activities.

In August 2020, after the United Nations Security Council rejected a U.S.-sponsored proposal to extend an arms embargo against Iran, Trump said that the U.S. would unilaterally "snapback" sanctions against Iran that had been lifted as part of the JCPOA—an argument based on the stance that the U.S. remained a "participant" in the 2015 Iran nuclear deal–despite Trump's withdrawal from it. The U.S. argument was met with skepticism by European allies. The Security Council voted on the Trump administration proposal later in August, with only the Dominican Republic joining the United States to vote in favor.

In total, the "maximum pressure" campaign made extensive use of the global financial system to isolate Iran. The United States imposed over 1,500 sanctions, targeting Iran’s central bank, national oil company, shipping lines, and other key sectors, as well as foreign entities conducting business with Iran. The threat of secondary U.S. Treasury sanctions led many international corporations and financial institutions to disengage, contributing to a sharp decline in Iran’s oil exports.

== IRGC and U.S. Armed Forces terrorist designations ==
Already during the Bush administration, the United States opposed the activities of the Islamic Revolutionary Guard Corps (IRGC) based on "the group's growing involvement in Iraq and Afghanistan as well as its support for extremists throughout the Middle East." There were plans to designate the group as a terrorist organization in 2007, but this did not materialize as a formal designation. On 8 April 2019, the US Department of State announced its intent to brand the IRGC a Foreign Terrorist Organization (FTO), effective April 15.

The Iranian parliament responded by ratifying a motion designating "all legal and real persons and troops of the United States and its allies operating in the West Asian region" terrorists, calling any aid to them a terrorist act and pressing the government to defuse the threat of IRGC designation through multilateral negotiations with international organizations. The nonbinding resolution cited "the terrorist nature of the United States regime, particularly that part of the American military and security forces and the US Central Command which have been carrying out acts of terrorism in Iraq, Afghanistan, Syria, and Iran in the past quarter-century, and have given overt support to terrorist plans." Soon after, the Supreme National Security Council cited similar concerns in declaring the IRGC designation dangerous and illegal, the United States a "terrorist government" and CENTCOM its primary "terrorist organization".

The US State Department Special Briefing also warned against increasing involvement of the IRGC forces in the Syrian conflict:

We believe this is an alarming trend. It's borne out by the facts and it merits closer inspection as we evaluate the landscape of terrorist activity globally. Add to this, of course, is the deepening commitment both Iran and Hezbollah have made to fight and kill on behalf of the Assad regime in Syria. That involvement, of course, is hardening the conflict and threatening to spread the violence across the region. Hezbollah and the Iranian leadership share a similar world view and strategic vision and are seeking to exploit the current unrest in the region to their advantage. This approach has increased sectarian tensions and conflict and serves further as a destabilizing force during a time of great change throughout the region.

Michael Rubin, a senior research fellow with the American Enterprise Institute, said he feared the IRGC designation "might exculpate the rest of the regime when, in reality, the IRGC's activities cannot be separated from the state leadership of Supreme Leader Khamenei or President Ahmadinejad". The Iranian newspaper Kayhan quoted the commander of Iran's elite Revolutionary Guards as threatening to deal heavier blows against the United States in response to the designation. Mohammad Khatami, former Reforms Front Iranian President hoped to "remind those in the U.S. Congress or elsewhere working for the benefit of the American nation to stand against these measures or the wall between the two countries grow taller and thicker".

This would be the first time that official armed units of sovereign states are included in a list of banned terrorist groups. Kaveh L. Afrasiabi, a former consultant to the UN's program of Dialogue Among Civilizations, stated in Asia Times Online that the move has possible legal implications: "Under international law, it could be challenged as illegal, and untenable, by isolating a branch of the Iranian government for selective targeting. This is contrary to the 1981 Algiers Accords' pledge of non-interference in Iran's internal affairs by the US government". News leaks about the prospective designation worried European governments and private sector firms, which could face prosecution in American courts for working with the IRGC.

In April 2019 the U.S. threatened to sanction countries continuing to buy oil from Iran after an initial six-month waiver announced in November 2018 expired. According to the BBC, U.S. sanctions against Iran "have led to a sharp downturn in Iran's economy, pushing the value of its currency to record lows, quadrupling its annual inflation rate, driving away foreign investors, and triggering protests." In December 2018, Iran's President Hassan Rouhani warned: "If one day they want to prevent the export of Iran's oil, then no oil will be exported from the Persian Gulf."

== Escalation in tensions ==
2019–2021 Persian Gulf crisis
- Part of the Iran–Saudi Arabia proxy war and Iran–Israel proxy conflict
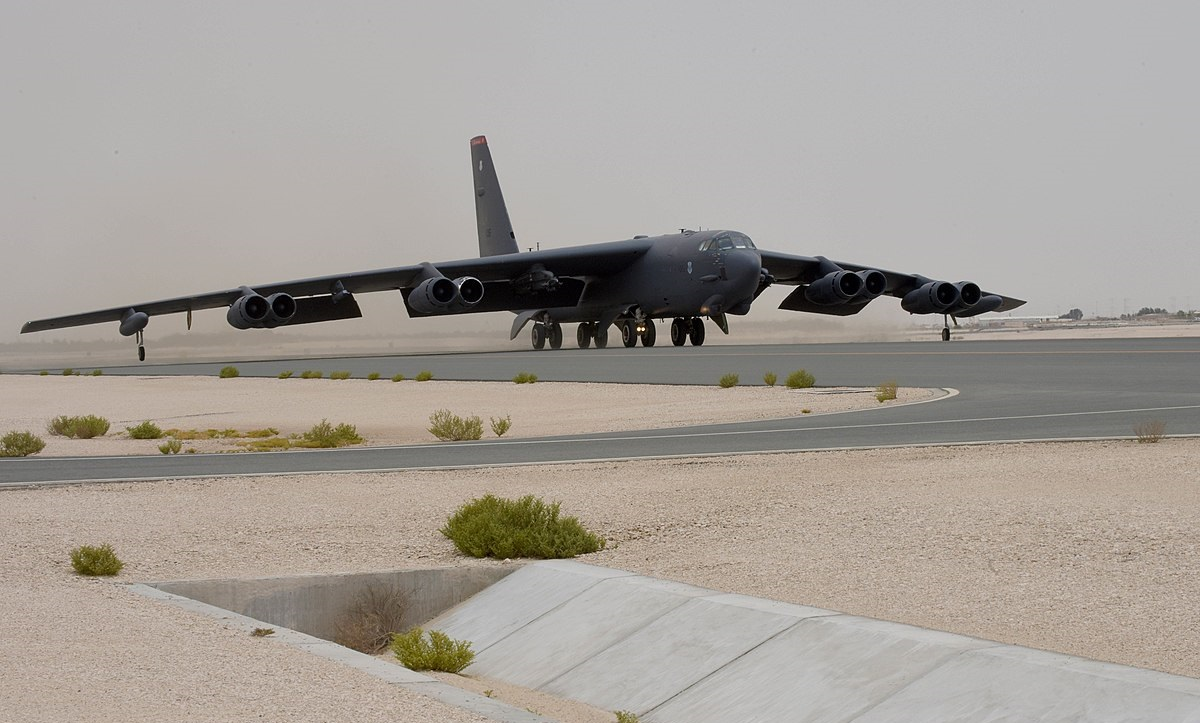
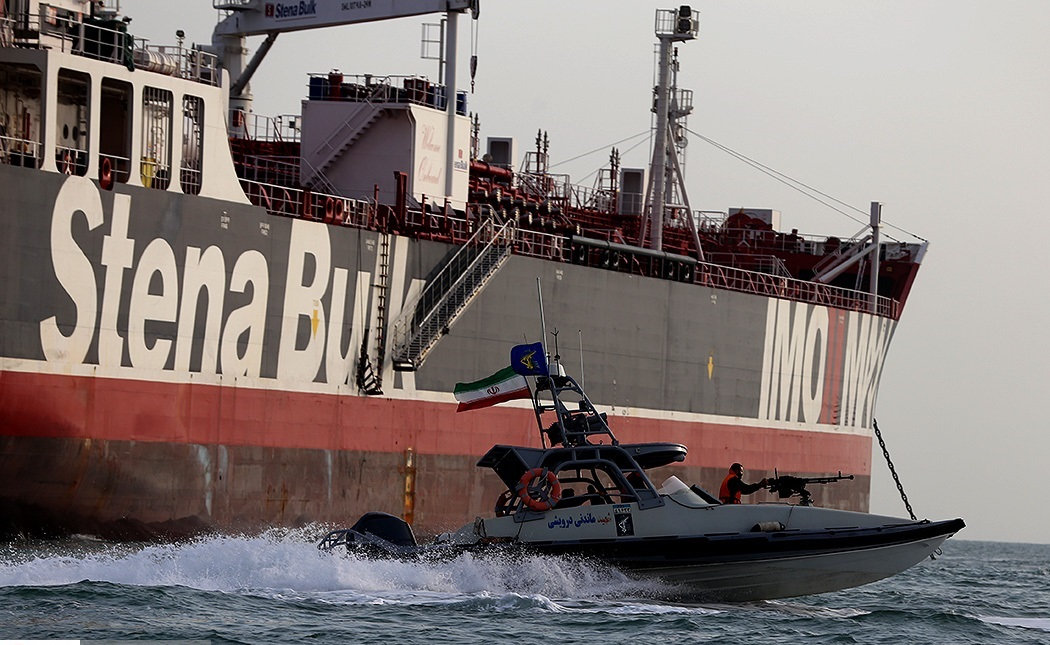
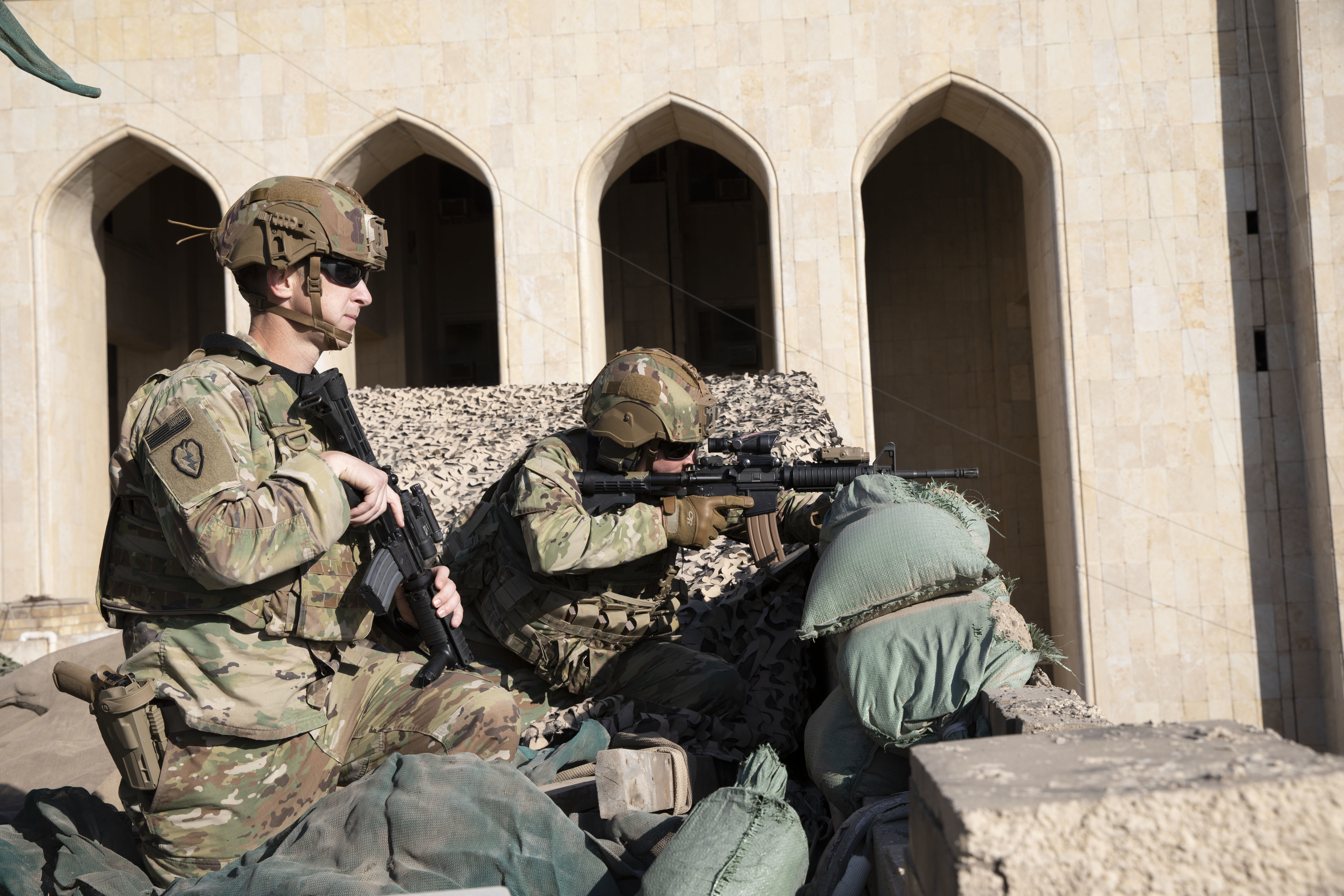
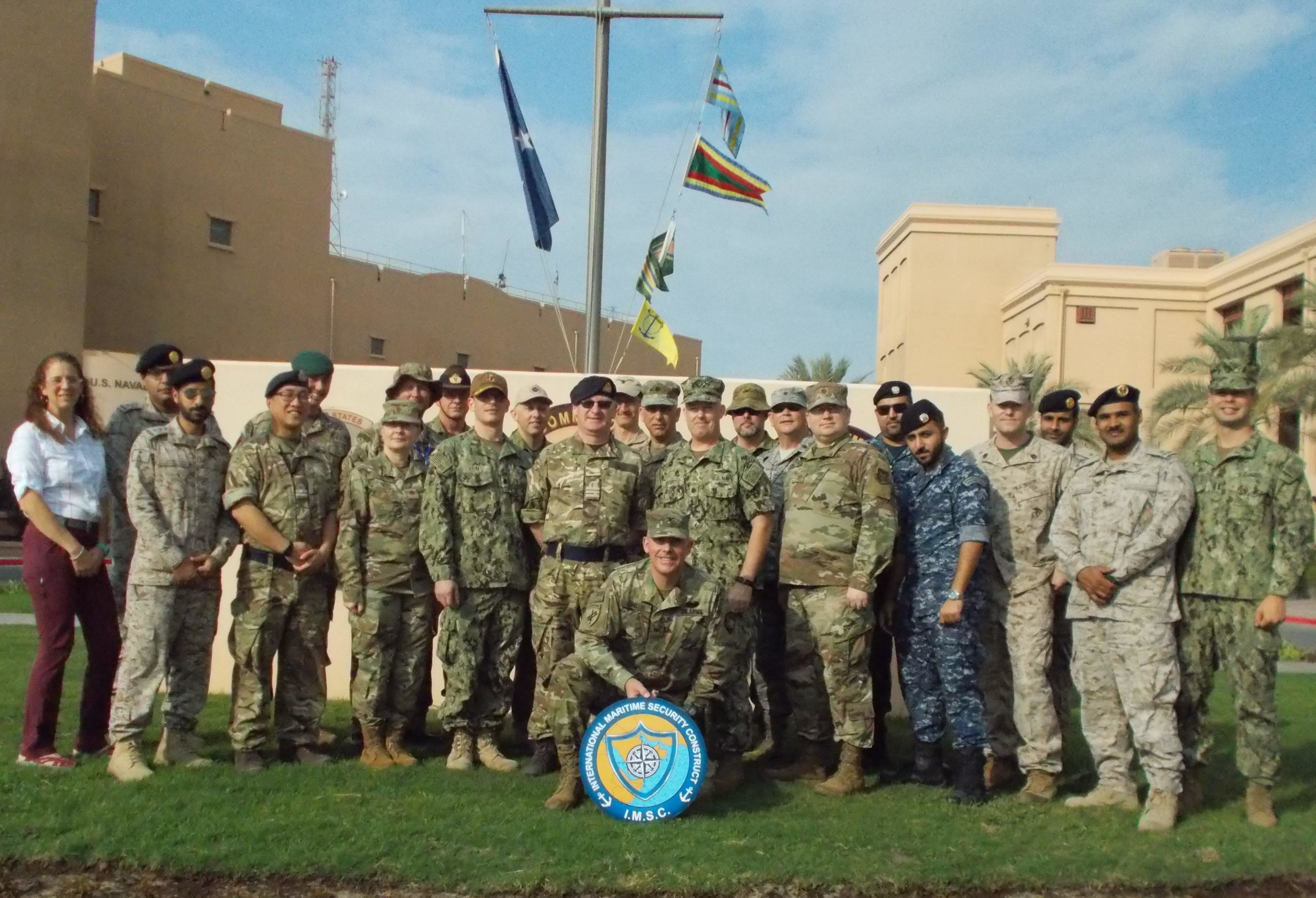
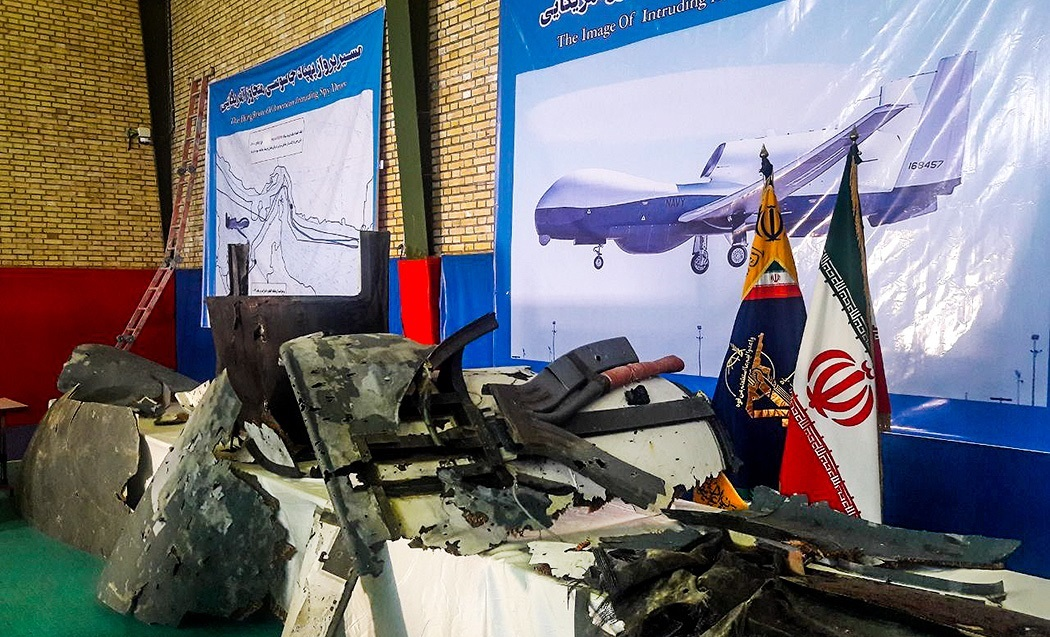
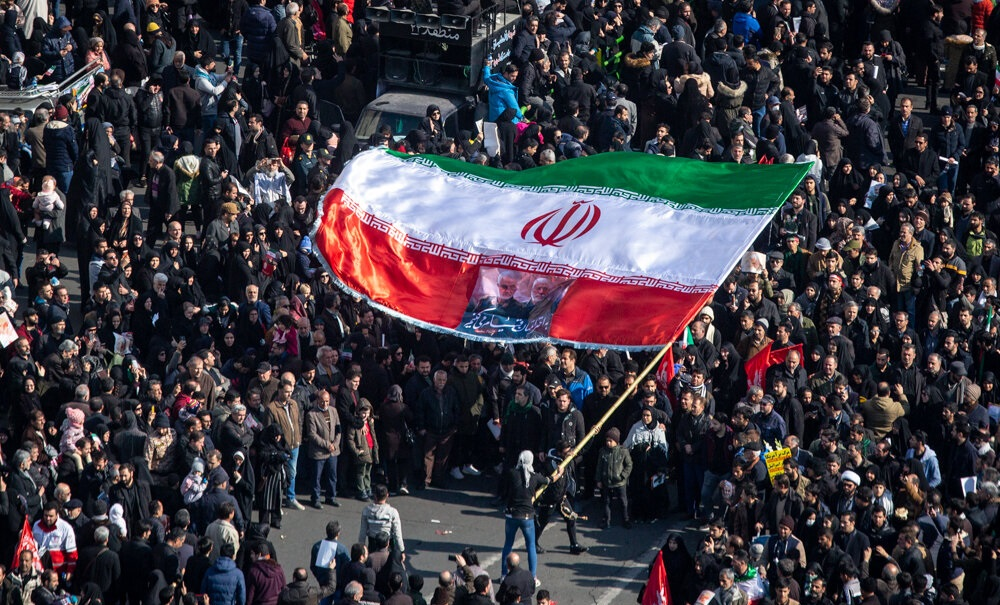
- Clockwise from top: A U.S. B-52H strategic bomber in Qatar in May 2019; A NEDSA boat patrolling near British-flagged tanker Stena Impero; Members of the International Maritime Security Construct in Bahrain; Funeral procession of an Iranian general in Tehran; Alleged remnants of the U.S. RQ-4 Global Hawk drone shot down by Iran; U.S. troops man positions during the attack on the U.S. embassy in Baghdad
Date	5 May 2019 – 20 January 2021 (1 year, 7 months, 3 weeks and 6 days)
Location	Western Indian Ocean; Persian Gulf; Gulf of Oman; Strait of Hormuz; Arabian Sea; Strait of Gibraltar; Red Sea; Iraq; Tehran
Status	De-escalated: 2019–21: Western military presence in Persian Gulf increased; formation of the American-led International Maritime Security Construct; Additional sanctions on Iran imposed; Assassination of the Iranian general Qasem Soleimani; Donald Trump loses the 2020 United States presidential election and steps down from the presidency, despite repeated attempts to overturn the results and remain in office; The international crisis was de-escalated, but ongoing tensions with Iran continued under President Joe Biden

Belligerents
United States; CJTF–OIR IMSC: United Kingdom; Saudi Arabia; Australia; United Arab Emirates; Bahrain; Albania; Kuwait; Qatar; Brunei Darussalam; Greece; Ireland; Philippines; Thailand; Turkey; Supported by: Japan Israel; Egypt	Iran; Popular Mobilization Forces; Kata'ib Hezbollah; League of Revolutionaries; Supported by: Houthis

Commanders and leaders
(United States) Donald Trump (United States) Mark Esper (United States) Joseph Dunford (United States) Mark Milley (United Kingdom) Boris Johnson (United Kingdom) Penny Mordaunt (United Kingdom) Ben Wallace (United Kingdom) Nick Carter (Saudi Arabia) King Salman (Saudi Arabia) Mohammed bin Salman (Saudi Arabia) Fayyadh Al Ruwaili	(Iran) Ali Khamenei (Iran) Hassan Rouhani (Iran) Amir Hatami (Iran) Mohammad Bagheri (Iran) Qasem Soleimani X Falih Al-Fayyad; Abu Mahdi al-Muhandis X

Strength
United States: 50,000 troops; 12 F-22 Raptors; 4 B52 bombers; 1 carrier strike group 10 Coastal Patrol Craft; 6 Patrol Boats; 4 Minesweepers; 1 amphibious ready group; United Kingdom: 1,200 troops; 9 Eurofighter Typhoon FGR4; 6 F-35 Lightning; 2 Type 23 frigate; 1 Type 45 destroyer; 1 Astute-class submarine; 4 minehunters; 1 landing ship; 1 fast fleet tanker; Australia: 200 personnel; 1 frigate; 1 P-8A Poseidon; Japan: 1 destroyer; 2 patrol planes	Iran: NEDSA fast attack craft 1 Mil Mi-17 1 3rd Khordad 1 Tor M1 6-10 Fateh-110/Fateh-313 missiles 5 Qiam 1 missiles

Casualties and losses
United States: 1 civilian contractor killed; 1 sailor dead (non-combat); 2 soldiers killed; 114 soldiers injured; 1 Black Hawk helicopter destroyed; 1 RQ-4A Global Hawk surveillance drone downed; 1 MQ-9 Reaper drone downed; United Kingdom: 1 soldier killed; Saudi Arabia: Oil facilities damaged	Iran: 5 IRGC members killed; 1-2 drones downed (U.S. claim, denied by Iran); Pro-Iran Iraqi militia: 5 Popular Mobilization Forces members killed; 25 Kata'ib Hezbollah members killed 60+ injured
- Tankers and ships: Saudi Arabia: 2 tankers damaged (responsibility disputed); Japan: 1 merchant ship damaged (responsibility disputed); United Arab Emirates: 1 merchant ship damaged (responsibility disputed); Iran: 1 tanker damaged (responsibility disputed); (Iraq) 1 Iraqi tanker seized; United Kingdom: 1 tanker captured by Iran, later released; (Norway) 2 merchant ships damaged; Philippines: 1 small vessel seized, 7 crew members captured; Neutral military personnel: Iraq: 5 Iraqi security forces personnel killed 13 Iraqi security forces personnel injured; PS752 shootdown: Total: 1 civilian aircraft shot down, 176 civilians killed; Iran 82; Canada 63; Ukraine 11; Sweden 10; Afghanistan 7; United Kingdom 3; Total: 222 killed

The Trump administration fostered warmer ties with the People's Mojahedin Organization of Iran (MEK), an exiled opposition group long opposed to the Iranian regime. Although the MEK had previously been designated a terrorist organization by the U.S. until 2012, several senior Trump associates, including National Security Advisor John Bolton and attorney Rudy Giuliani, publicly endorsed the group and spoke at its rallies. These appearances were part of broader efforts to support regime change in Iran. Critics noted the group's controversial past, including its alliance with Saddam Hussein during the Iran–Iraq War and its limited popularity among Iranians.

Throughout 2019, the administration imposed sanctions on Iranian Supreme Leader Ayatollah Ali Khamenei, Foreign Minister Mohammad Javad Zarif, other top officials and their associates, IRGC commanders, the Central Bank of Iran, and the Iranian industrial, construction, and other sectors. The U.S. sanctions caused economic damage to Iran, but did not cause the Iranian economy to collapse. The impact of new sanctions was also limited because many sanctioned entities had already been under U.S. sanctions.

Tensions between Iran and the United States escalated in May 2019, with the U.S. deploying more military assets to the Persian Gulf region after receiving intelligence reports of an alleged "campaign" by Iran and its "proxies" to threaten U.S. forces and Strait of Hormuz oil shipping. American officials pointed to threats against commercial shipping and potential attacks by militias with Iranian ties on American troops in Iraq while also citing intelligence reports that included photographs of missiles on dhows and other small boats in the Persian Gulf, supposedly put there by Iranian paramilitary forces. The United States feared they could be fired at its Navy.

On 5 May, U.S. national security adviser John Bolton announced that the U.S. was deploying the USS Abraham Lincoln Carrier strike group and four B-52 bombers to the Middle East to "send a clear and unmistakable message" to Iran following Israeli intelligence reports of an alleged Iranian plot to attack U.S. forces in the region. Bolton said, "The United States is not seeking war with the Iranian regime, but we are fully prepared to respond to any attack." The deployed USS Abraham Lincoln is in the Arabian Sea, outside the Persian Gulf.

On 7 May, U.S. Secretary of State Mike Pompeo made a surprise midnight visit to Baghdad after canceling a meeting with German Chancellor Angela Merkel. Pompeo told Iraqi President Barham Salih and Prime Minister Adil Abdul-Mahdi that they had a responsibility to protect Americans in Iraq. On 8 May, an advisor to Ayatollah Khamenei stated Iran was confident the U.S. was both unwilling and unable to start a war with Iran. On the same day, Iran announced that it would reduce its commitment to the JCPOA nuclear deal, which the U.S. pulled out of in May 2018. Iranian President Hassan Rouhani set a 60-day deadline for the EU and world powers to rescue the current deal before it resumed higher uranium enrichment. The United States Air Forces Central Command announced that F-15C Eagle fighter jets were repositioned within the region to "defend U.S. forces and interests in the region." On 10 May, the U.S. deployed the Marine transport ship USS Arlington and a Patriot SAM battery to the Middle East. The Pentagon said the buildup was in response to "heightened Iranian readiness to conduct offensive operations." On September 10, after the resignation of U.S. national security advisor John Bolton, Iran stated that his resignation will not lead to talks between Washington and Tehran. On September 16, Iran said that President Hassan Rouhani will not meet with U.S. President Donald Trump at the United Nations, unless sanctions on Iran are lifted.

== Gulf of Oman incidents ==
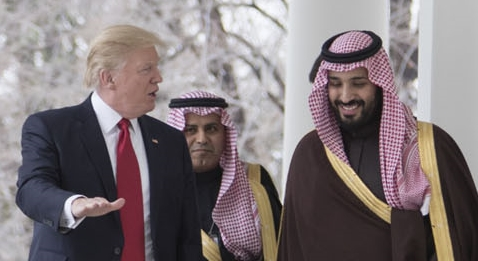
U.S. President Donald Trump and Saudi Crown Prince Mohammad bin Salman blamed Iran for tanker attacks.

In May 2019, tensions between Iran and the U.S. escalated after four ships were attacked near the UAE port of Fujairah, with Iran or its proxies suspected of involvement. In response, the U.S. issued military warnings and considered deploying 120,000 troops. On 14 May, both countries downplayed war, but the same day Houthi rebels, linked to Iran, attacked a Saudi pipeline, prompting the U.S. to withdraw non-essential staff from Iraq.

Despite rising tensions, President Trump appeared to downplay the threat from Iran on May 20, stating: “We have no indication that anything's happened or will happen, but if it does, it will be met, obviously, with great force. We will have no choice.” His comments contrasted with those of his national security team, including John Bolton, who had warned of escalating threats from Iran earlier that day.

On 24 May, the U.S. deployed 1,500 additional troops to the Gulf, and Secretary of State Mike Pompeo declared an "emergency" over Iran, allowing the administration to bypass congressional review and authorize $8 billion in arms sales to ally Saudi Arabia, citing the national security interest of the United States. Despite these developments, Iran stated it still complied with the nuclear deal, and both sides expressed a willingness to negotiate, although tensions remained high.

Following a second incident on June 17 in the Gulf of Oman in which two oil tankers caught fire after allegedly being attacked by limpet mines or by flying objects, the U.S. announced the deployment of an additional 1,000 soldiers to the Middle East.

== Drone incidents and cyber retaliation ==
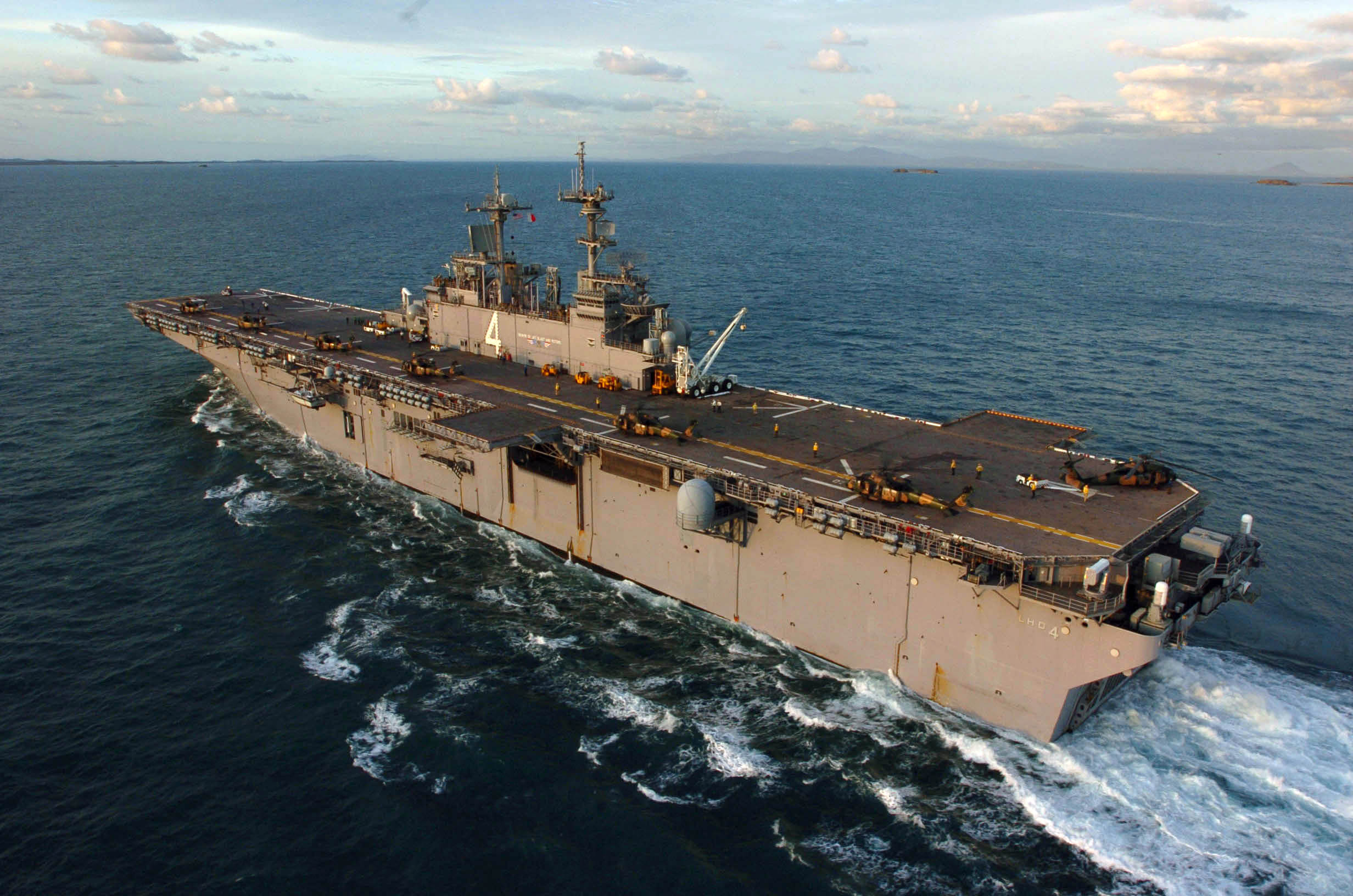
USS Boxer seen here off the coast of Australia, was deployed to the Persian Gulf in June 2019 as a result of increased tensions between US and Iran.

Tensions between the U.S. and Iran escalated significantly in June 2019. On June 20, Iran shot down a U.S. RQ-4A Global Hawk drone, claiming it had violated Iranian airspace. The U.S. denied this, stating it was in international airspace. President Trump initially ordered a retaliatory military strike but canceled it, saying he did so to prevent expected casualties. In retaliation, the U.S. conducted cyberattacks on Iran's missile control systems. On June 24, Trump imposed new sanctions on Iranian leadership, including Supreme Leader Ali Khamenei. Iran, meanwhile, refused to negotiate unless the sanctions were lifted. The U.S. continued to deploy military assets to the region, including fighter jets.

The British seizure of an Iranian-owned oil tanker near Gibraltar on July 4 was alleged by Iran and Spain to have been carried out on behalf of the US, with a BBC reporter saying it appeared to have at least been acting on US-provided intelligence.

On July 18, according to the Pentagon, USS Boxer took defensive action against an Iranian drone that had closed with the ship in the Persian Gulf to approximately 1,000 yards (910 m) and jammed the drone, causing downing of the aircraft. Iran's Deputy Foreign Minister Seyed Abbas Araghchi denied any of the country's drones had been brought down. Iran showed footage of the USS Boxer in a move to disprove Donald Trump's claims that the US shot down an Iranian drone in the Gulf.

On 15 September 2019, Iran rejected American accusations of conducting drone attacks on Saudi Arabia's oil fields. Iran also warned that it is ready for a "full-fledged" war.

== November 2019 Iran gasoline price protests ==
On November 15, 2019, Iran raised gasoline prices by 50%, leading to violent protests across the country, with demonstrators calling for President Hassan Rouhani's resignation. The price hikes were driven by worsening economic conditions, partly due to U.S. sanctions. In response, the U.S. expressed support for the protesters and condemned the Iranian government. On December 3, 2019, President Trump, during a NATO summit in London, claimed that the Iranian authorities were "killing perhaps thousands and thousands of people" amid the unrest.

== K-1 Air Base attack and aftermath ==
A major escalation occurred on 27 December 2019, when the K-1 Air Base in Iraq's Kirkuk Governorate, which housed both U.S. and Iraqi forces, was attacked with Katyusha rockets. The strike killed a U.S. civilian contractor and injuring several Iraqi Security Forces personnel as well as four U.S. soldiers. U.S. Secretary of State Mike Pompeo condemned the attack and blamed Iranian-backed Shi'ite militias, particularly Kata'ib Hezbollah.

That same day, Iran, Russia, and China launched a four-day naval exercise in the Gulf of Oman. According to Iranian sources, the drills were a response to recent U.S.–Saudi regional maneuvers and intended to show that Iran was not regionally isolated. In contrast, China's Ministry of National Defense described the exercise as a routine military exchange unrelated to international tensions.
In response to a series of attacks on Iraqi military bases, in particular the deadly strike on K-1 Air Base, U.S. forces launched airstrikes on 29 December targeting Kata'ib Hezbollah facilities in Iraq and Syria, despite the group's denial of involvement in the K-1 attack. The operation killed 25 militants and wounded at least 55 others. According to the U.S. Department of Defense, the strikes aimed to deter further assaults on coalition forces participating in Operation Inherent Resolve. At the time, approximately 5,000 U.S. troops were stationed in Iraq to support efforts against Islamic State remnants. Two days later, in a protest against the U.S. air strikes, the U.S. embassy in Bhagdad was attacked by Iraqi Shiite militiamen and their supporters. U.S. Defense Secretary Mark T. Esper stated that the United States would carry out pre-emptive strikes against Iranian-backed groups in Iraq and Syria if there are signs they are preparing further attacks on American forces or bases in the region.

== Assassination of Qasem Soleimani ==
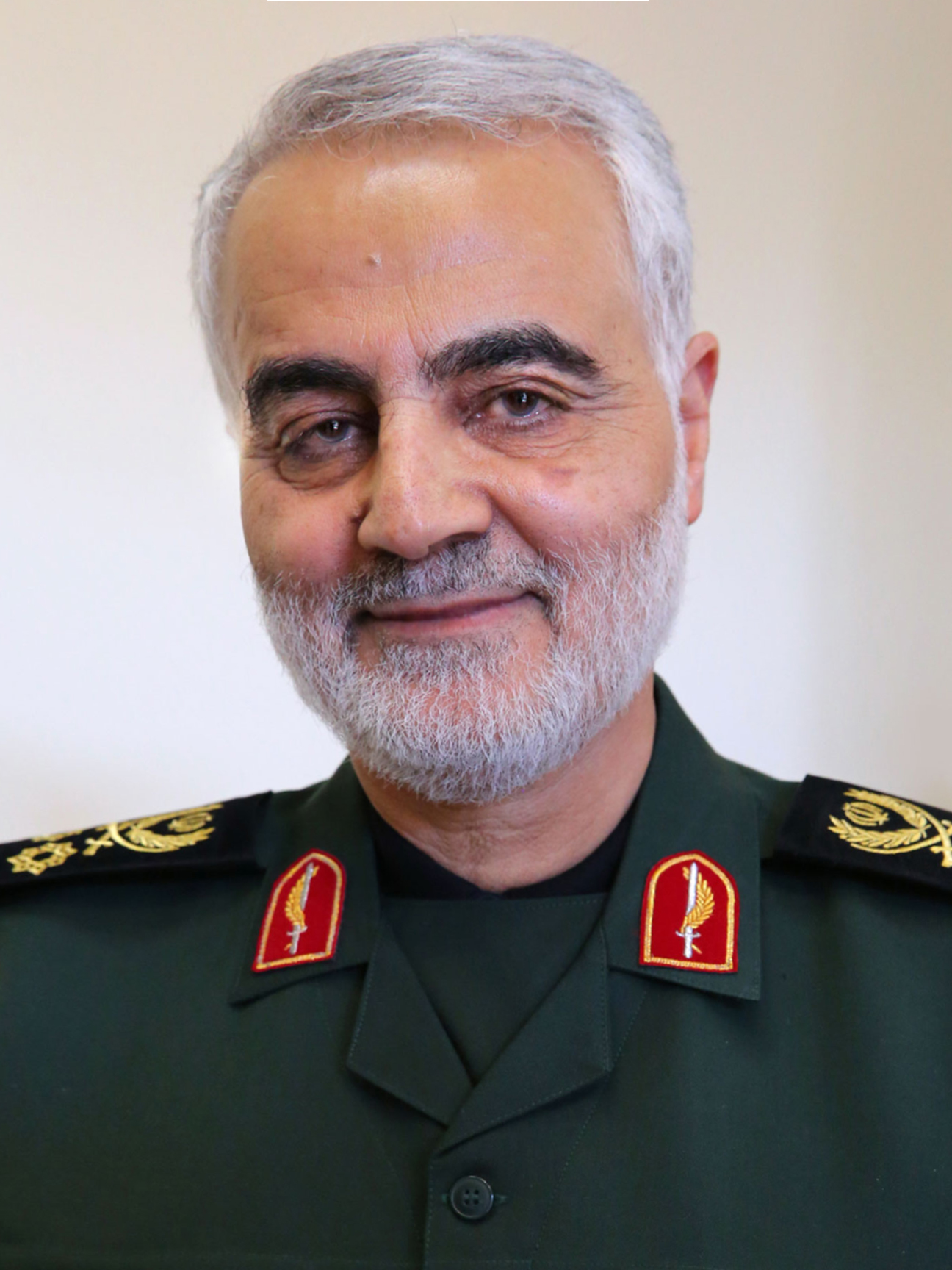
Qasem Soleimani

On January 3, 2020, Iranian General Qasem Soleimani was killed in a U.S. drone strike near Baghdad International Airport, following an order from U.S. president Donald Trump. Soleimani was a key military leader, and head of Iran's Quds Force, a branch of Iran's Islamic Revolutionary Guard Corps (IRGC), which is designated as a terrorist organization by both the United States and the European Union, and he played a central role in Iran's regional military strategy. Prior to the attack, both Trump's then-chief of staff Mick Mulvaney, and close advisor Senator Lindsey Graham had advised against targeting such a senior Iranian figure.

President Trump announces the death of Qasem Soleimani, January 3, 2020

President Trump later announced Soleimani's death in a televised address, calling Soleimani "the number-one terrorist anywhere in the world". He justified the operation by claiming that Soleimani was planning attacks against four U.S. Embassies across the Middle East. US Ambassador to the United Nations Kelly Craft wrote a letter to the UN Security Council in which she said that the act was one of self-defense. In this letter, she also wrote that the US stood "ready to engage without preconditions in serious negotiations with Iran, with the goal of preventing further endangerment of international peace and security or escalation by the Iranian regime." However, U.S. Defense Secretary Mark Esper later clarified that while there was a perceived threat, he had not seen intelligence specifically pointing to planned embassy attacks.

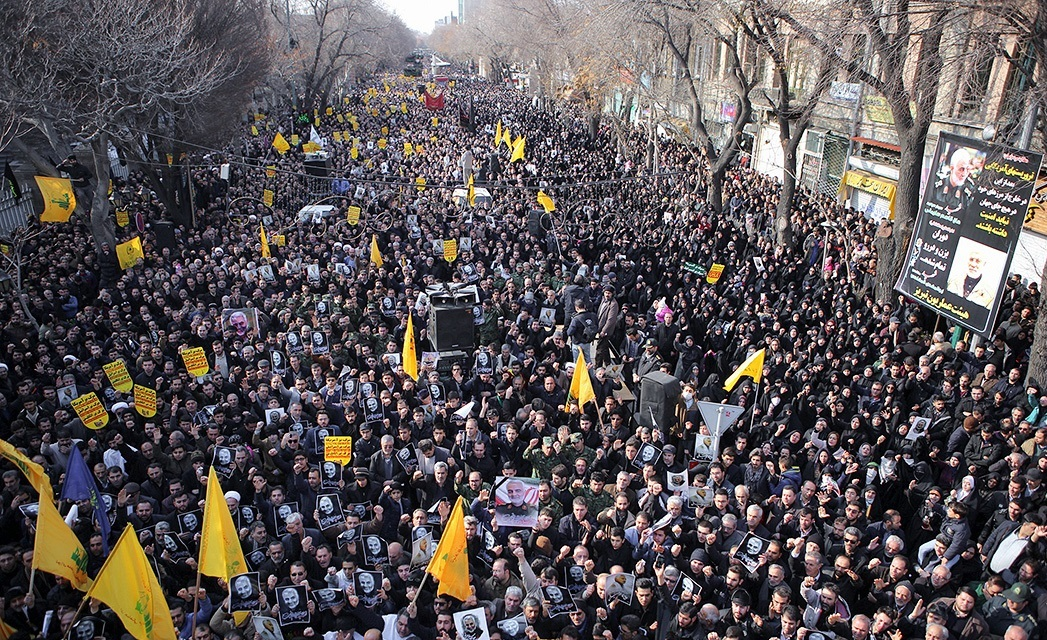
Demonstrations in Iran over the death of Qasem Soleimani during the U.S. attack on the Baghdad airport in Iraq on January 3, 2020

On the same day as the Baghdad airport strike, an IRGC financier and key commander, Abdulreza Shahlai was unsuccessfully targeted by U.S. drones in Yemen, which killed another Quds Force operative instead. Shahlai had previously been linked to the killing of five American soldiers in Karbala in 2007. According to the Washington Post the strike suggested the operation may have aimed to weaken IRGC leadership more broadly, rather than solely prevent an imminent threat.

The White House officially notified the U.S. Congress about the killing of Qassem Soleimani, in accordance with the 1973 War Powers Resolution, a day after the assassination had occurred. Meanwhile, thousands of people in cities across the U.S. participated in antiwar demonstrations against a new conflict in the Middle East.

== Aftermath of Soleimani's assassination ==
Shortly after Soleimani's assassination, Trump ordered the deployment of 3,000 additional troops to the Middle East, adding to the 14,000 sent there since May 2019. Amid fears of a direct confrontation between the two nations, Trump warned Iran against attacking U.S. assets or any Americans in the region. He threatened that in the event of an Iranian attack, the U.S. would strike "very fast and very hard", targeting 52 Iranian sites, including cultural sites, as a symbolic response to the 52 American hostages taken by Iran in the 1979–81 Iran hostage crisis. Many international legal experts noted that targeting cultural sites would constitute a war crime under the 1954 Hague Convention for the Protection of Cultural Property in the Event of Armed Conflict. Both Defense Secretary Mark Esper and Secretary of State Mike Pompeo said that the U.S. would not attack such sites, but would "follow the laws of armed conflict" and "behave inside the system".

On January 5, 2020, Iran declared it would no longer abide by the 2015 nuclear deal's limitations, but indicated it could return to compliance if sanctions were lifted. Iran also demanded the Iraqi parliament to get rid of the American presence in their country. In response to the assassination, the Iraqi parliament passed a resolution to expel all foreign troops, primarily targeting U.S. forces, though the vote was boycotted by Sunni and Kurdish lawmakers. In reaction, Trump threatened severe economic sanctions against Iraq, further straining U.S.-Iraqi relations. Rockets hit near the U.S. embassy and Balad Air Base during Soleimani's funeral, adding to the sense of instability and escalating military tension in the region.

Iran's parliament approved a €200 million budget increase for the Quds Force and formally designated the United States Armed Forces as a terrorist organization. Shortly thereafter, Iran launched Operation Martyr Soleimani targeting the Al Asad Airbase and Erbil airbase in Iraq with ballistic missiles as a direct retaliation for Soleimani's killing. Supreme Leader Ali Khamenei called the strikes a "slap in the face" to the United States, signaling Iran's broader aim to push U.S. forces out of the Middle East, while President Rouhani declared that Iran would no longer adhere to restrictions on uranium enrichment.

In response, Trump announced new sanctions against Iran and reaffirmed his commitment to prevent Iran from developing nuclear weapons, while ruling out immediate military retaliation. That summer, Iran issued an arrest warrant for 36 U.S. political and military officials, including Trump, for their role in the killing of Soleimani, though this effort was seen as symbolic.

Just hours after the missile strikes, Ukraine International Airlines Flight 752 was shot down by the IRGC, which reportedly misidentified it as an American cruise missile, killing all 176 on board, about half of them Iranians. Following Iran's admission of responsibility for the shootdown, anti-government protests erupted across the country, reigniting public anger that had become dormant after Soleimani's death. The protests were widespread, with gatherings reported in multiple cities, including Tehran, Isfahan, Hamadan, Rasht, and Sari. The protestors also called for the Supreme Leader Ali Khamenei to resign.

In an effort by the U.S. to contain the rising tensions with Iran, ambassador to the United Nations Kelly Craft informed the U.N. Security Council that the United States was open to negotiations to prevent further escalation. However, Ayatollah Khamenei and Iran's U.N. representative Majid Takht-Ravanchi rejected any talks unless the United States returned to the JCPOA, justifying Iran's military actions under Article 51 of the United Nations Charter. The Trump administration imposed new economic sanctions targeting Iran's metals industry and senior officials involved in the missile attacks, which the U.S. Treasury estimated could impact "billions" in revenue.

Amid this unrest, Hezbollah Secretary-General Hassan Nasrallah called for Iran's regional allies to intensify their military campaigns against U.S. forces. Meanwhile, British Prime Minister Boris Johnson suggested negotiating a new nuclear deal with Iran, an idea that Trump expressed support for. Military operations against the Islamic State in Iraq resumed on 15 January 2020 after a ten-day suspension, following the strike on Soleimani. For the first time since 2012, Ayatollah Khamenei led Friday prayers in Tehran, using the occasion to denounce Western powers and reiterate Iran's intention to push U.S. forces out of the Middle East. The same day, the Asian Football Confederation banned Iran from hosting international football matches, adding to the country's growing isolation. The U.S. response continued, with sanctions imposed on Brigadier General Hassan Shahvarpour, an IRGC commander accused of overseeing violent crackdowns on protesters in Mahshahr County.

A Associated Press poll found that only 41% of Americans supported the killing of Soleimani. An USA Today–Ipsos poll, found that 55% of Americans said they believe that the U.S. is less safe because of the killing of Soleimani.

In June 2020, Iranian authorities issued arrest warrants for 36 U.S. officials, including President Trump, for their alleged involvement in Soleimani's killing.

== March 11 attack and retaliation ==
Washington officials claimed in mid March 2020 that an Iran-backed militia group attacked a US military base in Iraq, which killed two American soldiers and a British soldier. Later, during the same week, the US military launched a missile strike against Kata'ib Hezbollah in Iraq, which led to the killing of militiamen, a civilian present at the base, along with five Iraqi servicemen. In retaliation, rockets again struck near the Green Zone of the US Embassy in Baghdad.

== Exchange of rhetoric and diplomatic escalation ==
On 17 January 2020, after Iran attacked two U.S. military bases in Iraq, Ayatollah Ali Khamenei reappeared, after eight years, in Tehran Friday Prayer and defended the Islamic Revolutionary Guard Corps (IRGC) and said "... The day that tens of millions in Iran and hundreds of thousands in Iraq and other countries came to the streets to honor the blood of the Quds Force commander, shaping the biggest farewell of the world," Ayatollah Khamenei said. "Nothing can do that except of the powerful hand of God." he added "The IRGC's reaction was a military blow, but even beyond, it was a blow to the U.S. image as a superpower." Donald Trump replied in tweets, Khamenei "should be very careful with his words!".

In the months that followed, the Trump administration continued its pressure campaign through diplomatic channels. In August 2020, the Trump administration unsuccessfully attempted to trigger a mechanism that was part of the agreement and would have led to the return of U.N. sanctions against Iran. Despite having withdrawn from the nuclear deal with Iran, the Trump administration asserted that the U.S. still qualified as a "participant" under the deal, in order to invoke the "snapback" provision and pressure the United Nations Security Council to restore pre-agreement sanctions on Iran in response to its alleged breaches. However, the agreement provided for a resolution process among current signatories, which had not yet run its course. The Security Council voted on the U.S. proposal later that month, with only the Dominican Republic joining the United States in support. The diplomatic standoff underscored how, rather than isolating Iran, the U.S. had largely isolated itself from the international consensus. Throughout president Trump’s efforts to dismantle the JCPOA, he faced persistent resistance, even from key European allies.

== COVID-19 pandemic ==
Iran's President Hassan Rouhani wrote a public letter to world leaders asking for help on 14 March 2020, saying his country was struggling to fight the outbreak due to lack of access to international markets as a result of the United States sanctions against Iran. Iran's Supreme Leader Ayatollah Ali Khamenei claimed that the virus was genetically targeted at Iranians by the US, and this is why it is seriously affecting Iran. He did not offer any evidence.

U.S. President Donald Trump said he would be willing to provide coronavirus aid, such as ventilators, to Iran to help deal with the COVID-19 pandemic.

== Military satellite ==
The Noor-1 satellite flew into orbit on a multi-stage rocket and was launched from the Shahroud missile range in northern Iran. While not a present threat to the United States and other Iranian adversaries, the completion of the mission confirms the technical competency of the nascent Islamic Revolutionary Guard Corps (IRGC).

Though lauded by the Tasnim News Agency as a national "milestone," the Islamic Republic is not inexperienced in space exploration and, particularly, low-earth orbit operations. In both 2009, 2015, and 2017, Iran sent, respectively, the Omid, Fajr, and Simorgh satellites into orbit.

Despite recent setbacks with high-ranking assassinations and pandemic resistance, the 2020 launch sends a clear message to all Middle Eastern and transoceanic powers: Iran continues to make progress in its quest for regional supremacy and advanced domestic and military technology. Mounting pressure in the last decade has U.S. military and political leaders fearful of Iran's capability of creating ballistic-carrying spacecraft. U.S. Secretary of State Mike Pompeo disapproved of Iran's successful launch, stating that it proves that the space program is "neither peaceful nor entirely civilian," but the Trump administration, supposedly, "never believed this fiction." During a press conference on 22 April, Pompeo said: "The Iranians have consistently said that these missile programs were disconnected from their military, that these were purely commercial enterprises. I think today's launch proves what we've been saying all along here in the United States: The IRGC, a designated terrorist organization, launched a missile today."

== Iran ships fuel to Venezuela ==
In May 2020, five Iranian tankers carrying millions of dollars' worth of petrol and similar products were sailed to Venezuela, as part of a wider deal between the two US-sanctioned nations amid heightened tensions between Tehran and Washington. The tankers' voyage came after Venezuela's president Nicolás Maduro had already turned to Iran for help flying in chemicals needed at an aging refinery amid a petrol shortage, a symptom of the wider economic and political chaos gripping Latin America's one-time largest oil producer.

The U.S. was seeking to seize Iranian tankers sailing toward Venezuela with oil and gasoline supplied by Iran, the latest attempt to disrupt ever-closer trade ties between the two heavily sanctioned anti-American allies. Reports suggested four US Navy warships were in the Caribbean for a 'possible confrontation with Iran's tankers'.

Following the US threat, in a letter to United Nations chief António Guterres, Mohammad Javad Zarif warned against "America's movements in deploying its navy to the Caribbean in order to intervene and create disruption in [the] transfer of Iran's fuel to Venezuela". He said any such action would be "illegal and a form of piracy" adding that the US would be responsible for "the consequences", according to a foreign ministry statement.

On 25 May 2020, Venezuela welcomed the arrival of the first of five Iranian tankers carrying gasoline, providing urgently needed fuel to the country amid a severe crisis. The rest of Iranian oil tankers arrived to their destination shortly without any disruption. The gasoline shipments arrived in defiance of strict U.S. sanctions imposed by the Trump administration on both nations, marking a new stage in the deepening relationship between Venezuela and Iran.

== Iranian bounty program ==
In August 2020, U.S. intelligence officials assessed that Iran offered bounties to the Taliban-linked Haqqani network to kill foreign servicemembers, including Americans, in Afghanistan. U.S. intelligence determined that Iran paid bounties to Taliban insurgents for the 2019 attack on Bagram airport. According to CNN, Donald Trump's administration has "never mentioned Iran's connection to the bombing, an omission current and former officials said was connected to the broader prioritization of the peace agreement and withdrawal from Afghanistan."

On August 6, 2020, the Trump administration fired the State Department's Special Representative to Iran Brian Hook. Jason Rezaian viewed it as a tacit admission that the so-called maximum pressure policy toward Iran had failed. They did this ahead of a U.S.-led U.N. Security Council vote ton whether to prolong an embargo on the sale of weapons to Iran set to expire in October. Rezaian said that Russia and China were almost certain to veto the extension allowing Iran to start buying arms again from whomever it likes.

== 2020 United States presidential election ==
During the 2020 United States presidential election, Iran, along with China and Russia, was suspected of foreign interference in the election. When asked by moderator Kristen Welker about how intelligence officials recently uncovered evidence of Iranian interference in the election during the 2020 United States presidential debates, Democratic candidate Joe Biden responded that Iran would "pay a price" for interfering in the election. Following Biden's victory against incumbent Donald Trump, Iran's President Hassan Rouhani said that Biden's administration has a chance to "compensate for previous mistakes".

== US-based 'terrorist' leader arrested by Iran ==
On 1 August 2020 Iranian security forces detained US-based Iranian monarchist Jamshid Sharmahd. He was suspected of masterminding the 2008 Shiraz mosque bombing which killed 14 people and wounded 215. Iran claimed Jamshid Sharmahd, the head of pro-monarchy militant group Tondar, "directed armed and terrorist acts in Iran from America". Iran views Tondar (Persian for thunder) also known as the Kingdom Assembly of Iran, as a terrorist organization. The authorities have asserted links between the group and several people in connection to the 2008 bombing.

=== Assassination of Abu Muhammad al-Masri ===
On 7 August 2020 Abu Muhammad al-Masri, second-in-command leader of Al-Qaeda, while driving his car in the Pasdaran neighborhood of Tehran, Iran, was shot to death by Israeli agents. On January 12, 2021, Mike Pompeo confirmed his death, although no further proof was given from either side.

== See also ==
- Foreign relations of Iran
- Foreign policy of the first Trump administration
- Iran–United States relations during the George W. Bush administration
- Iran–United States relations during the Obama administration
- Iran–United States relations during the Biden administration
- Iran–United States relations during the second Trump administration
- Views on military action against Iran
