= American withdrawal from Iraq =

There have been two formal withdrawals of American military personnel from Iraq since the 2003 American invasion. Each marked the end of a "major combat mission" there.

- Withdrawal of United States troops from Iraq (2007–2011)
- Withdrawal of United States troops from Iraq (2020–2021)
