= Operation Sentinel =

Operation Sentinel may refer to a number of different military operations:

- 2001–2002 India–Pakistan standoff
- Opération Sentinelle, the placing of military guards in major French cities after the 2015 terror attacks
- US-led Operation Sentinel, an early name for what became the International Maritime Security Construct, a military coalition tasked with protecting shipping in the Strait of Hormuz and Gulf of Aden.
