= December 2019 United States airstrikes in Iraq and Syria =

War event against Iraqi group Kata'ib Hezbollah

- Part of the American-led interventions in Iraq and Syria (Operation Inherent Resolve) and the 2019–2021 Persian Gulf crisis
- Type: Airstrikes
- Locations: Anbar and Kirkuk, Iraq; Valley of Euphrates River, Syria
- Target: Kata'ib Hezbollah
- Date: 29 December 2019; 11:00 a.m. (EST) (UTC-05:00)
- Executed by: United States: United States Air Force
- Outcome: See Aftermath
- Casualties: 19 (Iraq) 6 (Syria) killed 55+ injured

On 29 December 2019, the United States conducted airstrikes against Kata'ib Hezbollah's weapons depots and command centers in Iraq and Syria, reportedly killing at least 25 militiamen and wounding 55 more. The U.S. Department of Defense said the operation was in retaliation for repeated attacks on Iraqi military bases hosting Operation Inherent Resolve (OIR) coalition forces, particularly the 27 December 2019 attack on a Kirkuk airbase that left an American civilian contractor dead. Kata'ib Hezbollah, an extremist Shi'ite militia funded by Iran, denied any responsibility for the attacks.

The unilateral U.S. airstrikes were condemned by the Iraqi government, Iraqi Armed Forces personnel, and Iran, and culminated in the U.S. embassy in Baghdad being attacked by Iraqi militiamen and their supporters on 31 December 2019. This in turn led to a U.S. airstrike near Baghdad International Airport on 3 January 2020, killing Iranian general Qasem Soleimani and Kata'ib Hezbollah commander Abu Mahdi al-Muhandis.

== Background ==
The United States intervened in Iraq in 2014 as a part of Operation Inherent Resolve (OIR), the U.S.-led mission to combat the Islamic State of Iraq and the Levant (ISIL) terror organization, and have been training and operating alongside Iraqi forces as a part of the anti-ISIL coalition. ISIL was largely beaten back from Iraq in 2017 during an internal conflict, with the help of U.S.-backed forces and Sunni and Shia militias. Iran, which also intervened in Iraq, is known to support Shia Iraqi militias, a number of which are relatively hostile to the U.S. presence in Iraq and the Sunni-led Iraqi government. Tensions rose between Iran and the U.S. in 2018 when U.S. President Donald Trump unilaterally pulled out of the 2015 nuclear deal and reimposed sanctions.

On 27 December 2019, the K-1 Air Base in Kirkuk province, Iraq—one of many Iraqi military bases that hosted Operation Inherent Resolve coalition personnel—was attacked by multiple rockets, killing a U.S. civilian contractor and injuring four U.S. service members and two Iraqi security forces personnel. The U.S. blamed the Iranian-backed Kata'ib Hezbollah militia for the attack while the group denied responsibility.

A senior U.S. official said there had been a "campaign" of 11 attacks on Iraqi bases hosting OIR personnel in the two months before the 27 December incident, many of which the U.S. attributed to Kata'ib Hezbollah.

== Strikes ==
Video of the U.S. strikes on Kata'ib Hezbollah in western Iraq, 29 December 2019

At around 11:00 am EST on 29 December 2019, the United States attacked five Kata'ib Hezbollah positions in Iraqi and Syrian territory. According to the Pentagon, the U.S. targeted three locations in Iraq and two in Syria, including weapon storage facilities and command and control posts. One U.S. official claimed the strikes were carried out by F-15E fighter jets using precision-guided bombs and that secondary explosions were observed after some of the strikes, indicating the sites may have contained stored munitions. The ammunition facilities reportedly held both rockets and drones used by the militia.

The U.S. did not specify the locations of the strikes, but one of the Iraqi strikes had reportedly targeted a headquarters of the militia in or near al-Qa'im District along the western border with Syria. The strikes in Syria took place along the Middle Euphrates River Valley (MERV) in the southeast of the country.

=== Casualties ===
Reportedly, at least 25 militia fighters were killed and 55 wounded. According to Iraqi security and militia sources, at least four local Kata'ib Hezbollah commanders were among the dead in the Iraqi strikes, including Abu Ali Khazali. U.S. officials could not confirm the militia casualty counts.

== Immediate aftermath ==
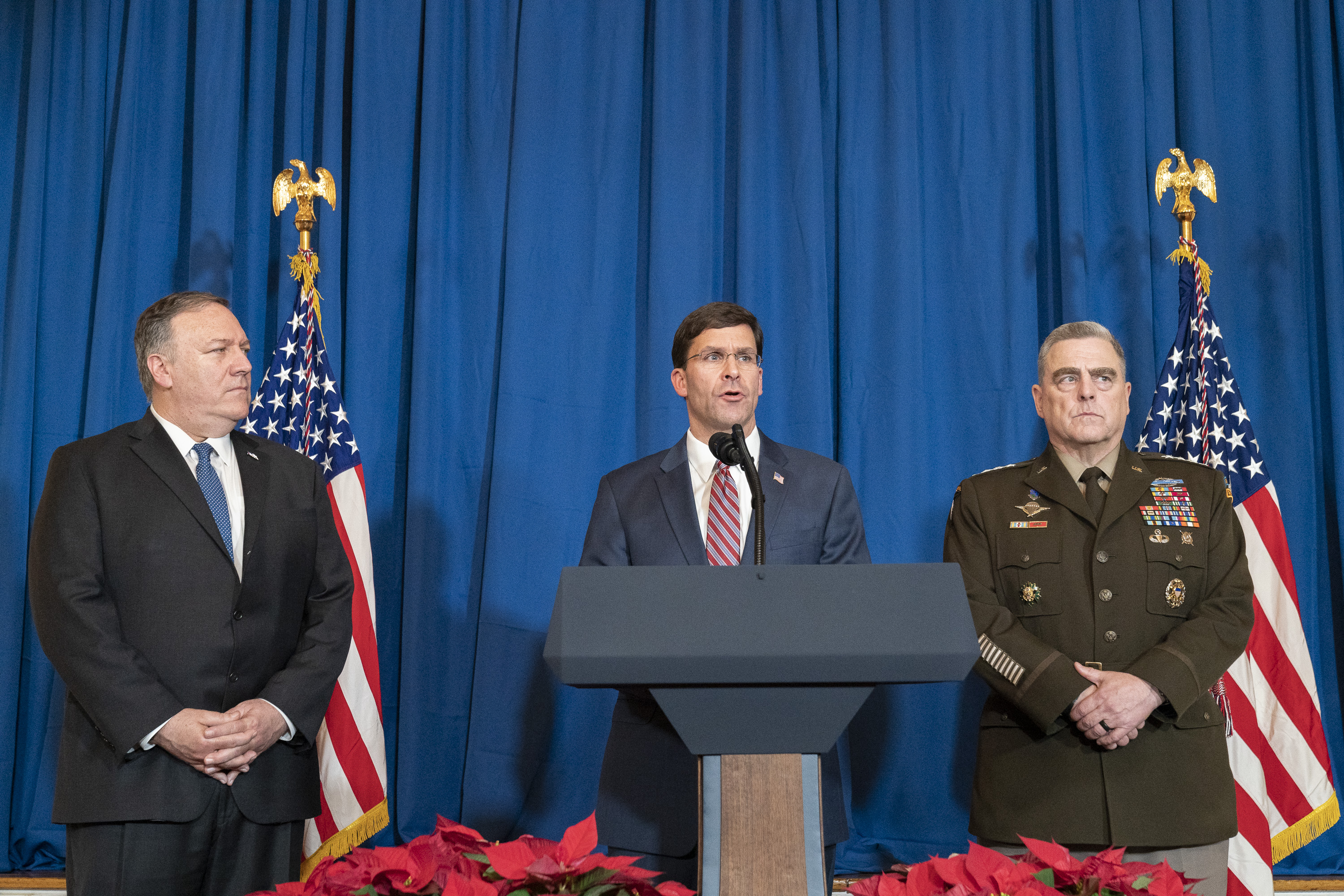
U.S. Secretary of State Mike Pompeo, Secretary of Defense Mark Esper, and Chairman of the Joint Chiefs of Staff Gen. Mark Milley brief reporters on the airstrikes, 29 December 2019.

Following the strikes on 29 December, U.S. officials warned that further actions could be undertaken to defend U.S. interests and "deter further bad behavior from militia groups or from Iran". U.S. President Donald Trump was briefed before and after the strikes by his national security advisors and was informed that a further military response could be warranted.

In a statement, U.S. Assistant to the Secretary of Defense Jonathan Hoffman called the strikes "defensive" and stated that they were in retaliation to prior Kata'ib Hezbollah attacks on both Operation Inherent Resolve coalition forces and their Iraqi partners in prior weeks and months. Hoffman also asserted that the militia had received weapons from Iran's Quds Force that have been used to attack OIR forces. U.S. Secretary of State Mike Pompeo considered the attacks a warning against any actions by Iran that endangers the lives of Americans.

=== Reactions in Iraq ===
An Iraqi Armed Forces spokesman stated that U.S. Defense Secretary Mark Esper informed Iraqi Prime Minister Adil Abdul-Mahdi half an hour before the operation, to which he strongly objected to and condemned; the spokesman called the unilateral U.S. airstrikes "a treacherous stab in the back". Prime Minister Abdul-Mahdi later declared three days of national mourning, from 31 December 2019 until 2 January 2020. The prime minister argued that the strikes did not take place based on evidence of a specific threat but was instead geopolitically motivated by the regional tensions between Iran and the U.S.

Senior Popular Mobilization Units commander Abu Mahdi al-Muhandis said "Our response will be very tough on the American forces in Iraq".

=== U.S. embassy attack ===
2019 U.S. embassy in Baghdad attack
- Date: 31 December 2019 – 1 January 2020
- Location: Green Zone, Baghdad, Iraq; 33.299°N 44.396°E
- Type: Protests, vandalism, and arson
- Motive: In response to the U.S. airstrikes on 29 December 2019
- Target: Embassy of the United States, Baghdad
- Perpetrator: Kata'ib Hezbollah
- Organised by: IRGC (allegedly)
- Outcome: See Aftermath

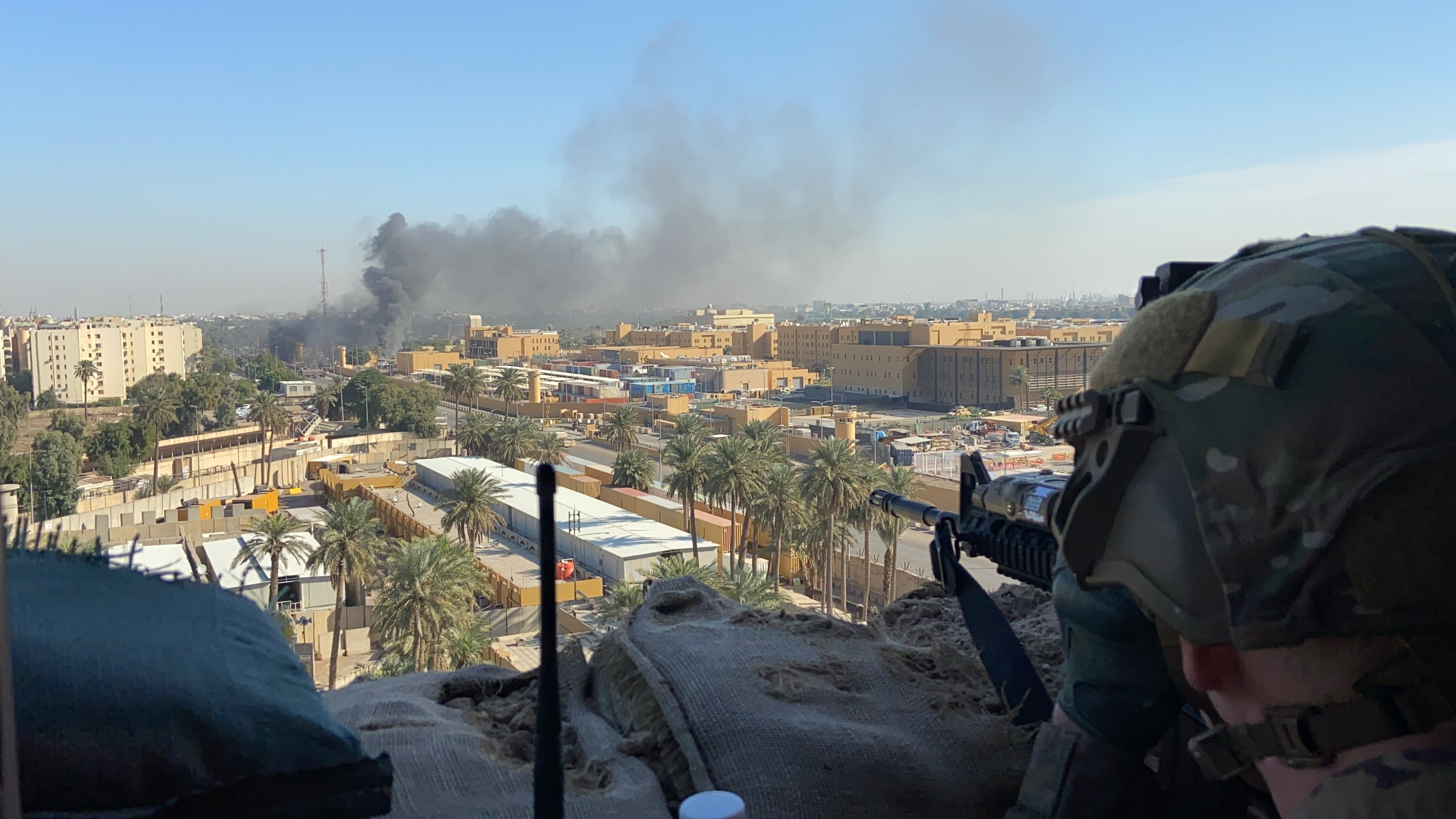
Soldiers from the U.S. Army's 25th Infantry Division maintain overwatch of the embassy protests from FOB Union III, Green Zone, 31 December 2019.

U.S. AH-64 Apache helicopters deploy flares over the Green Zone in a show of force amid the embassy attack, 31 December 2019.

On 31 December, PMF militiamen and their supporters attacked the U.S. Embassy in Baghdad, prompting the U.S. to deploy additional soldiers to help quell the situation. The attack was prompted by the U.S. airstrikes.

On 31 December 2019, after a funeral was held for the Kata'ib Hezbollah militiamen that were killed by the prior U.S. airstrikes, an angry mob of dozens of Iraqi Shiite militiamen and their supporters marched through the perimeters of Baghdad's heavily fortified Green Zone, marched down Kindi Street, and surrounded an entrance to the U.S. embassy compound. According to the Associated Press, Iraqi security forces did not attempt to stop the mob and permitted them to pass a security checkpoint.

The mob began taunting the security personnel of the embassy reception area's front gatehouse checkpoint near the embassy's parking lot and chanting "down, down USA", "Death to America" and "Death to Israel". They scaled and threw stones and water bottles over the walls and attacked gates, windows, and doors with makeshift rams. Dozens of the demonstrators then smashed through a main door of the checkpoint, set fire to the reception area, raised PMF militia flags and anti-American posters and sprayed anti-American graffiti. Video of the demonstration reportedly also showed militiamen ransacking the reception area and seizing paperwork. Security staff withdrew to the embassy; there was no immediate comment from the Pentagon and the U.S. State Department on the situation. U.S. ambassador to Iraq Matt Tueller was not at the embassy at the time and was away on previously scheduled "personal travel".

As the fire broke out, an AP reporter on the scene observed at least half a dozen U.S. Marine Security Guardsmen and Diplomatic Security Service personnel on the roof of the main embassy building with their guns trained on the intruders, many of whom were wearing militia uniforms; the intruders stopped in a corridor after about 5 meters (16 feet), and were about 200 meters away from the main embassy building. There were also reports of tear gas being deployed to disperse the intruders as at least three protesters appeared to have difficulties breathing. The mob subsequently set fire to three trailers used by security guards along the embassy compound's wall. Reportedly, a man on a loudspeaker urged the mob not to enter the compound, saying: "The message was delivered." Some commanders from Iranian-backed Iraqi militia factions began joining the protesters, including chief of the Badr Organization and PMF commander Hadi al-Amiri and leader of the Iranian-backed "Special Groups" paramilitary collective Qais al-Khazali. Iraq's interior minister Yassine al-Yasseri was also briefly at the scene, calling the situation "embarrassing to the [Iraqi] government."

By early evening, the mob, which at one point numbered in several hundreds, had largely retreated and protesters had set up tents outside the embassy in an attempted sit-in. Kata'ib Hezbollah spokesman Jaafar al-Husseini claimed the protestors had no intention of storming the embassy and that the sit-in was to continue "until American troops leave Iraq and the embassy is closed." Many of those who participated in the greater Iraqi protests condemned the prior U.S. airstrikes on PMF positions in Iraq, saying that "[d]emonstrations at [the] US embassy are a natural response to the US strikes over Hashd positions in Iraq", but also condemned the attack on the American embassy, saying, "we are staying here in the hub of the peaceful protest movement" and adding that the "crowds in the Green Zone do not represent us. We want peaceful change."

Secretary of State Mike Pompeo would later identify Abu Mahdi al-Muhandis, Qais al-Khazali, Falih Al-Fayyad, and Hadi al-Amiri as leaders of the attack on the embassy.

==== Security response ====
SPMAGTF-CR-CC arrive in Baghdad to reinforce the U.S. embassy, 31 December 2019.

The U.S. responded by sending hundreds of additional troops to the Persian Gulf region, including approximately 100 U.S. Marines to reinforce security at the Baghdad embassy. No deaths or serious injuries occurred during the attack and protesters briefly breached the main compound. However they only made it about 15–20 feet in.

After the news of the embassy compound's perimeter breach, U.S. Defense Secretary Mark Esper stated that reinforcements were en route to the compound and urged the Iraqi government to "fulfill its international responsibilities" and protect the facility. About five hours after the violence first erupted, 30 Iraqi soldiers in seven armored vehicles arrived and deployed near the embassy walls but not near the burning, breached checkpoint. Reportedly, four vehicles carrying riot police later approached the embassy but were forced back by the protesters who blocked their path. A detachment of approximately 100 U.S. Marines assigned to a crisis response unit in Kuwait, Special Purpose Marine Air-Ground Task Force – Crisis Response – Central Command (SPMAGTF-CR-CC), along with two U.S. Army AH-64 Apache attack helicopters from Taji, Iraq were deployed to secure the embassy. Mark Esper subsequently announced the immediate deployment of an infantry battalion of about 750 U.S. soldiers from the 82nd Airborne Division to the Middle East. He did not specify their destination, but a U.S. official familiar with the decision said they were to deploy to Kuwait. Esper said additional soldiers from the 82nd Airborne's rapid-deployment brigade, known officially as its Immediate Response Force, were prepared to deploy over the next several days. The 750 soldiers deploying immediately were in addition to 14,000 U.S. troops sent to the Persian Gulf region since May 2019 in response to concerns about Iranian aggression.

On 1 January 2020, the protests flared up again as demonstrators started a fire on the roof of the reception area, reportedly prompting U.S. Marines to fire tear gas at the crowd, without any significant injuries to the protesters or guards. Iraqi soldiers, federal police, and counterterrorism units lined up between the protesters and the compound. No further clashes occurred as Popular Mobilization Forces militia leaders called on demonstrators to take down the tents and withdraw. Militia supporters considered the attack on the embassy a victory against the U.S. and that their message had been sent, with one supporter proclaiming "We rubbed America's nose in the dirt." The U.S. State Department said all American personnel were safe and that there were no plans to evacuate the embassy.

=== Other reactions ===
- Iran - Iranian Foreign Ministry spokesman Abbas Mousavi said the U.S. had "openly shown its support to terrorism and shown its negligence to the independence and national sovereignty of countries". He added that the U.S. must accept responsibility of the consequences of the "illegal attacks". In response to U.S. assertions that Iran was behind the Iraqi airbase attacks, the supreme leader of Iran tweeted "If Iran wants to fight a country, it will strike directly."
- Bahrain - Bahrain's foreign ministry released a statement supporting the airstrikes.
- Israel - Israeli Prime Minister Benjamin Netanyahu praised the airstrikes and emphasized the militia's ties to Iran.
- Russia - Russia's foreign ministry called the situation unacceptable and called for restraint from both sides.
- Hezbollah - In a statement, Lebanon's Hezbollah called the strikes "a blatant violation on the sovereignty, security and stability of Iraq and the Iraqi people".

== Later aftermath ==
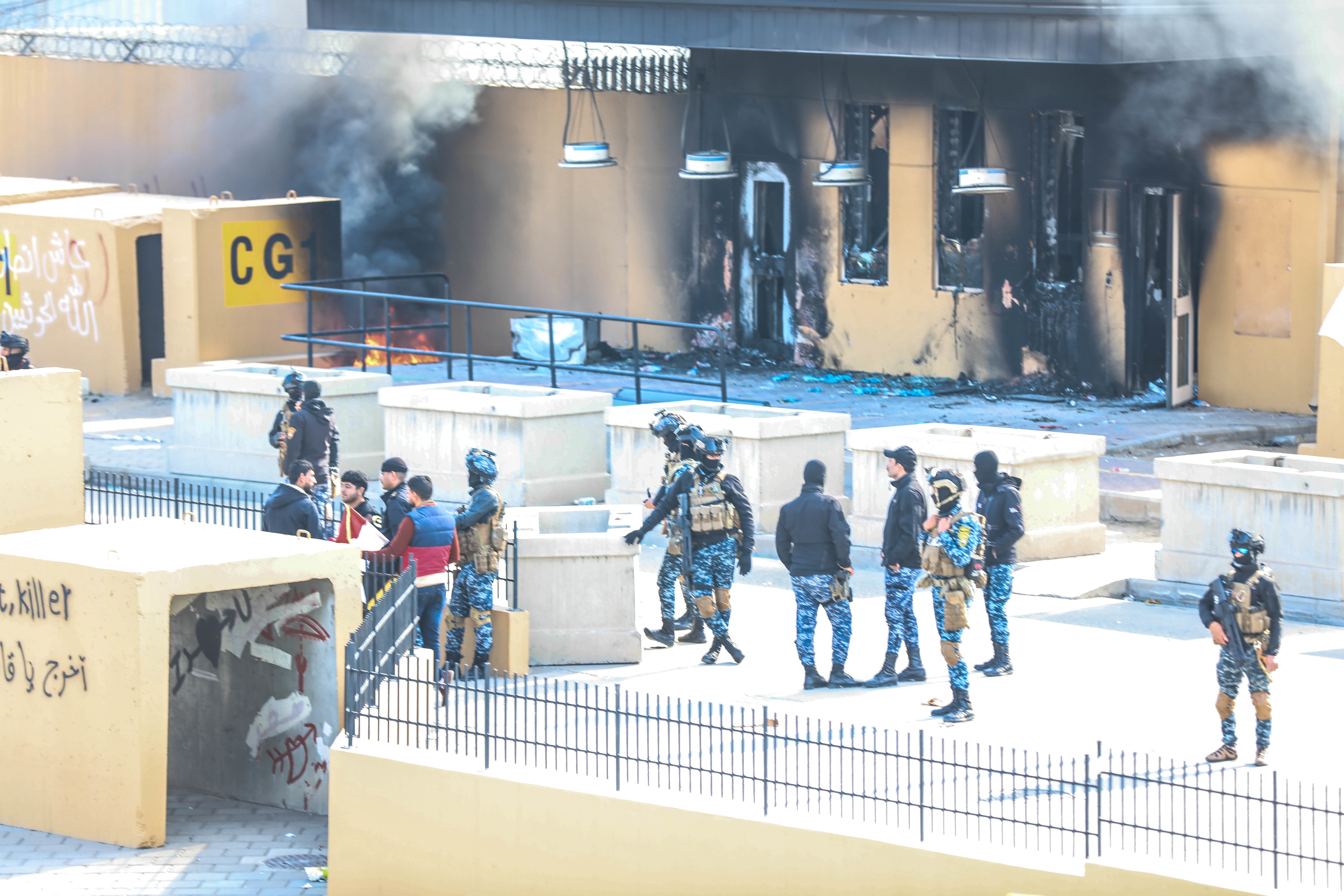
Iraqi Police outside the smoldering outer perimeter of the U.S. embassy, 1 January 2020

U.S. President Donald Trump accused Iran of "orchestrating" the attack on the embassy and added that they would be held "fully responsible." U.S. Secretary of State Mike Pompeo named then-Popular Mobilization Forces deputy chief Abu Mahdi al-Muhandis, Asa'ib Ahl al-Haq leader Qais al-Khazali and PMF commander Hadi al-Amiri (both of which were present at the embassy attack), and PMF chairman Falih Al-Fayyad as responsible for the attack; al-Amiri and Al-Fayyad were reportedly guests to the White House during the Obama administration. Iran's foreign ministry denied they "were behind" the "protests" at the U.S. embassy and warned against any "retaliation". Supreme leader of Iran Ali Khamenei tweeted "If Iran wants to fight a country, it will strike directly."

Israeli Foreign Minister Israel Katz held Iran responsible for the embassy attack, saying that Iran had made a "grave mistake" by attacking the embassy and called on the international community to confront what he called the "rebel regime" in Tehran.

On 2 January 2020, U.S. Defense Secretary Mark Esper said "the game has changed" and stated that the U.S. would preemptively strike Iranian-backed paramilitary groups in Iraq if there were indications they were preparing to attack U.S. forces, while also urging the Iraqi government to resist Iranian influence. U.S. Chairman of the Joint Chiefs of Staff Mark Milley emphasized that any group that attempted to overrun the Baghdad embassy will "run into a buzzsaw."

Hours after Esper's announcement, in the early morning hours of 3 January 2020, the U.S. conducted a drone strike, killing the commander of Iran's Quds Force, Major General Qasem Soleimani (the second most powerful person in Iran), and Abu Mahdi al-Muhandis while they were traveling in a convoy near Baghdad International Airport. The U.S. attack was formally announced by the United States Department of Defense in a press release. Iran retaliated by attacking U.S. bases in Iraq, primarily Al Asad Airbase, with tens of ballistic missiles; there were no deaths in the attack but 110 U.S. soldiers received brain concussions and at least 5 structures were destroyed.

On 26 January 2020, three more rockets were fired on the U.S. embassy wounding at least one staff member present in the cafeteria at dinner time, with the nationality of the wounded still undisclosed, other sources reported 3 wounded.

In autumn 2020, U.S. Secretary of State Mike Pompeo repeatedly threatened to close the U.S. Embassy in Baghdad if Iraqi leaders did not prevent further attacks on the embassy. According to some media sources, Pompeo informed Baghdad that it would target 120 sites in Iraq linked to Iran-backed militias if rocket attacks cost American lives.

== See also ==
- February 2021 United States airstrike in Syria
- Iranian involvement in the Syrian Civil War
- 2019–2021 Iraqi protests
- Iraqi conflict (2003–present)
