= 2019 K-1 Air Base attack =

Rocket attack against US personnel in Kirkuk Province, Iraq

- Part of 2019–2021 Persian Gulf crisis
- Type: 31 107mm Katyusha rockets (U.S. claim); 11-16 Katyusha rockets (Iraqi claim)
- Location: K-1 Air Base, Kirkuk Governorate, Iraq; 35°30′45″N 044°17′03″E
- Target: U.S. personnel at K-1 Air Base
- Date: 27 December 2019; 7:20 pm (GMT+3)
- Executed by: Disputed (Kata'ib Hezbollah alleged by United States, denied by Kata'ib Hezbollah) (Islamic State alleged by Iraq's National Security Council)
- Casualties: 1 U.S. civilian contractor killed (Note: US defense contractor Nawres Hamid was an American naturalized citizen.) (Note: On 7 January 2020, U.S. President Donald Trump claimed that another victim of the attack died.); 4 U.S. service members and 2 Iraqi security forces personnel wounded

A rocket attack was carried out on the K-1 Air Base in Kirkuk province in Iraq on 27 December 2019. Who carried out the attack has not been conclusively determined. The air base was one of many Iraqi military bases that host Operation Inherent Resolve (OIR) personnel and, according to the coalition, was attacked by more than 30 rockets. The attack occurred during the 2019–2021 Persian Gulf crisis and preceded a series of events that eventually brought Iran and the United States to the brink of open conflict.

== Casualties ==
According to Iraqi Brigadier General Ahmed Adnan, the chief of intelligence for the federal police at K-1, three rockets fell on the Iraqi side of the K-1 base, one on the perimeter fence and about seven on the American side. At least one hit a munitions store on the American side, causing a large secondary explosion. The rocket attack killed an American civilian contractor and injured four U.S. service members and two Iraqi security forces personnel. Few of the details of the attack were immediately made available and the names of other American military service members wounded in the attack were undisclosed, according to The New York Times.

The American contractor that was killed, an Iraqi-American named Nawres Waleed Hamid from Sacramento, California, worked at the base as a linguist under the company Valiant Integrated Services. Valiant Integrated Services paid for his funeral and burial at the Greater Sacramento Muslim Cemetery, which took place on 4 January 2020, the day after his body was returned to the United States.

== Alleged perpetrators ==
The U.S. blamed the Iranian-backed Kata'ib Hezbollah militia—a subgroup of Iraq's Popular Mobilization Units (PMU)—for the attack, citing evidence and military intelligence that was not made public or shared with the Iraqis. Kata'ib Hezbollah denied its involvement and no other group has publicly claimed responsibility for the attack. According to CNN, a U.S. official stated that there were many similarities to 10 other rocket attacks in prior months, which they attributed to militias supported by Iran. According to Iraqi General Ahmed Adnan, U.S. investigators removed any rocket fragments and one unexploded rocket from the Iraqi side of the base, making it difficult for the Iraqis to conduct a deeper, independent forensic investigation. According to VOA News and The New York Times, a launchpad for Katyusha rockets was discovered in a deserted white pickup truck close to the air base by Iraqi security personnel. Four rockets that failed to launch were found in their silos. The Iraqis sent the pickup to U.S. forces where, according to two unidentified U.S. officials, U.S. investigators found evidence in the truck that helped attribute it to Kata'ib Hezbollah. The officials also cited separate communications intercepts that reportedly showed the group's involvement.

On 6 February 2020, over a month after the attack, The New York Times reported that Iraqi military and intelligence officials said they had no direct evidence to prove that Kata'ib Hezbollah, which reportedly had not had a presence in Kirkuk Province since 2014, was involved in the attack. Iraqi officials suggested that the Islamic State (IS), a Sunni terror group, may have orchestrated it given that the rockets were launched from a Sunni part of Kirkuk notorious for attacks and executions by the group, which would have also made the area hostile territory for a Shiite militia like Khata'ib Hezbollah, and the fact that ISIL had carried out three attacks relatively close to the base in the ten days before the attack on K-1. The Times report also highlighted discrepancies with the Iraqi and U.S. accounts of the attack, including the amount of rockets fired; the U.S. said 31 rockets were fired, several Iraqi officers at K-1 said as many as 16 were fired, and Gen. Adnan said 11 were fired.

By February 2020, the U.S. had yet to share its intelligence with Iraqi officials that it says linked the attack to the militia. Iraqi intelligence officials said it was difficult to assess the U.S. assertions without seeing their intelligence. According to U.S. officials, despite the fact that they closely cooperate on counter-terrorism efforts, the U.S. does not always share sensitive intelligence with Iraq because of Iranian influence and operatives present within the central government that could feed intelligence to Iranian leadership.

== U.S. response ==
The airbase attack led to a rapid series of events within the following week, starting with U.S. retaliation in Iraq and Syria, which targeted five Kata'ib Hezbollah weapon storage facilities and command and control locations. At least 25 militia members reportedly died and at least 55 were reportedly wounded.

It was followed by a militia attack on the U.S. Embassy in Baghdad, which in turn led to a U.S. airstrike near Baghdad International Airport, killing Iranian general Qasem Soleimani and PMU commander Abu Mahdi al-Muhandis.
