= International Maritime Security Construct =

Military coalition

- التحالف الدولي لأمن وحماية حرية الملاحة البحرية (Arabic) al-Tahaluf al-Duwaliu Li'amn Wahimayat Huriyat al-Milahat al-Bahria
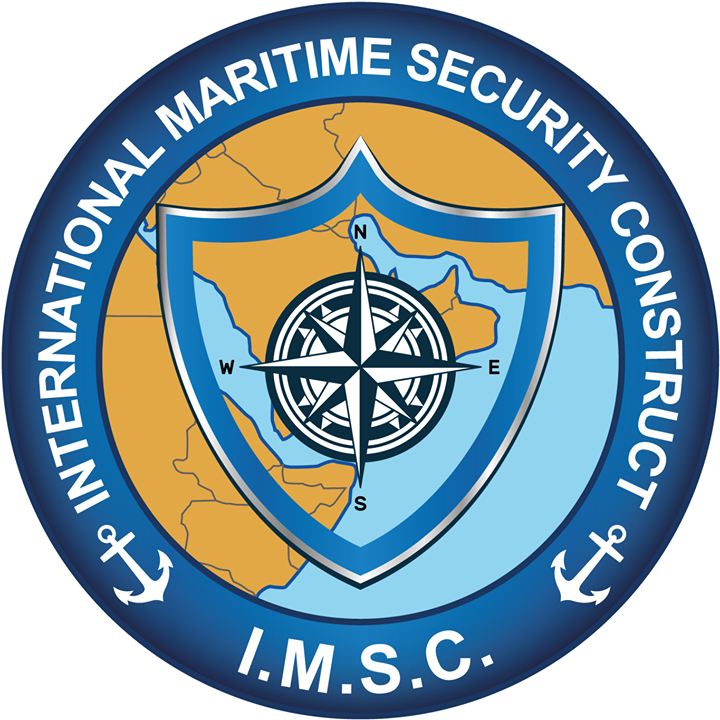

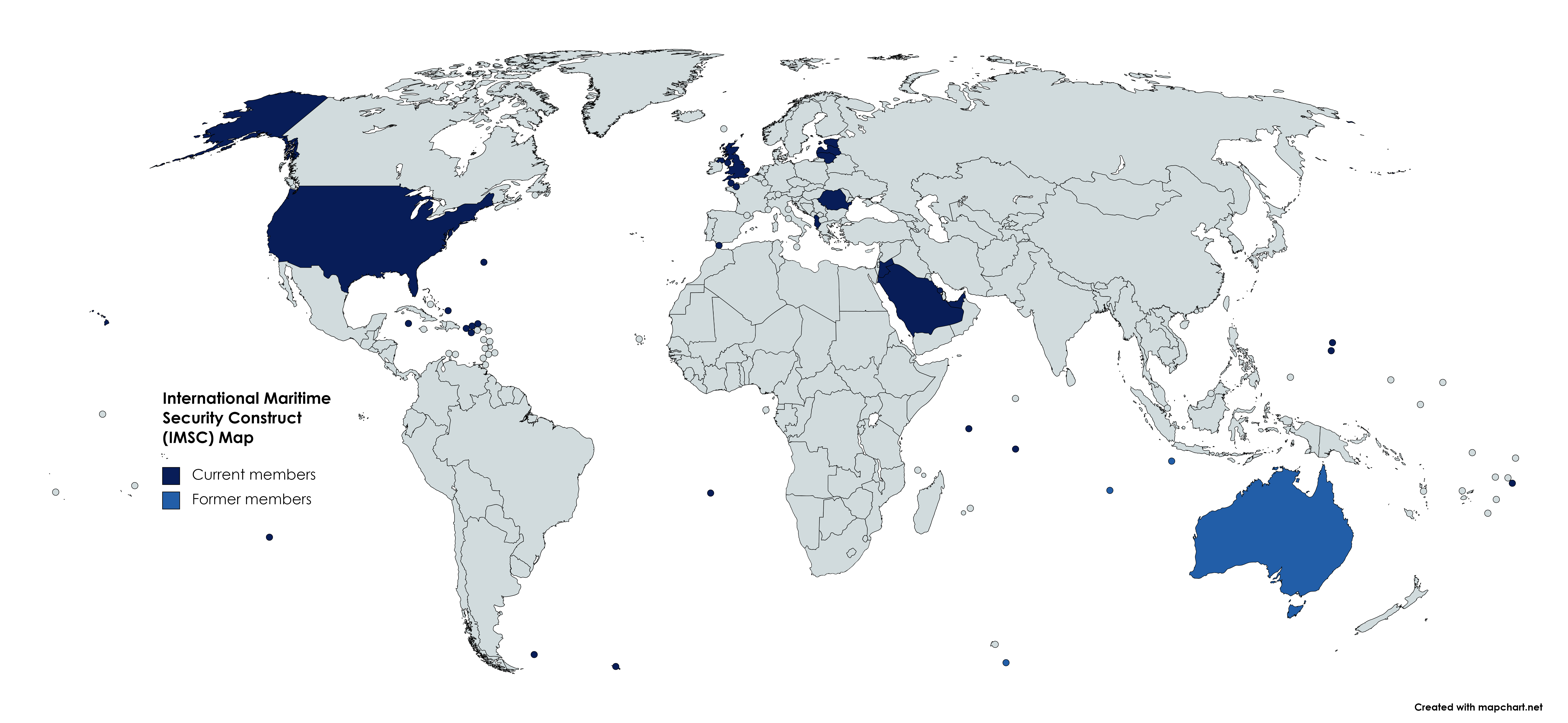
- Formation: September 16, 2019; 7 years ago
- Type: Military coalition
- Headquarters: Manama, Bahrain
- Region served: Persian Gulf
- Members: 12 states: Albania; Bahrain; Estonia; Latvia; Lithuania; Romania; Saudi Arabia; Seychelles; United Arab Emirates; United Kingdom; United States; Jordan
- Official language: English
- Website: www.imscsentinel.com

The International Maritime Security Construct (IMSC) is a consortium of countries whose official stated aim is the maintenance of order and security in the Persian Gulf, Strait of Hormuz, Gulf of Oman, Gulf of Aden, Bab-el-Mandeb, and Southern Red Sea, particularly regarding maritime security of global oil supply routes. It was formed on 16 September 2019 in Bahrain, by the United Kingdom, Australia, Albania, Saudi Arabia, Bahrain, Lithuania, the United Arab Emirates, and the United States. The operational arm of the IMSC is Coalition Task Force SENTINEL (CTF SENTINEL).

The security construct was formed by U.S. in 2019 after oil tankers were allegedly attacked by Iran. The coalition also aims to address the oil tankers seizure by Iran in the region's waters. The IMSC's primary task is monitoring international waters of the region to ensure the freedom of navigation of merchant vessels plying their trade in the area. Early in its formation process, the project was known as Operation Sentinel.

== Formation ==
Early in summer 2019 near the Strait of Hormuz, a Norwegian tanker and a Japanese tanker were attacked, and the British tanker Stena Impero was seized by Iranian naval forces.

Shortly thereafter, the IMSC was formed "in support of regional and international efforts to deter and counter threats to maritime navigation and global trade in order to secure freedom of navigation in the Gulf amid heightened regional tensions after attacks on oil tankers that were widely blamed on Iran, as well as to address Iran's illegal seizure of tankers in the region." Several Persian Gulf countries signed on to IMSC in mid-September in the wake of Iranian cruise missile attacks on the Saudi Arabian Abqaiq oil facility. It was joined by countries from the Baltics in 2020.

U.S. Air Force General Paul Selva, Vice Chairman of the U.S. Joint Chiefs of Staff, describes the purpose of the IMSC as protecting the freedom of navigation in the waters of the region and the commander of U.S. Naval Forces in the Middle East defines its role as strictly defensive.

IMSC is a flexible and temporary construct that can scale operations to conditions in the maritime environment. There are currently eight nations supporting IMSC, with several other nations in various stages of joining the organization. The IMSC is not part of the U.S. Maximum Pressure Campaign against Iran and does not play a part in United Nations sanctions enforcement against any nation. IMSC has no affiliation to any political agenda other than protecting freedom of navigation on the high seas. Ships, aircraft, and maritime forces for IMSC are sourced from Coalition force contributions to operations within the Middle East. Forces supporting IMSC are prohibited from simultaneously accomplishing other national missions that would conflict with the IMSC mandate.

== Operations ==
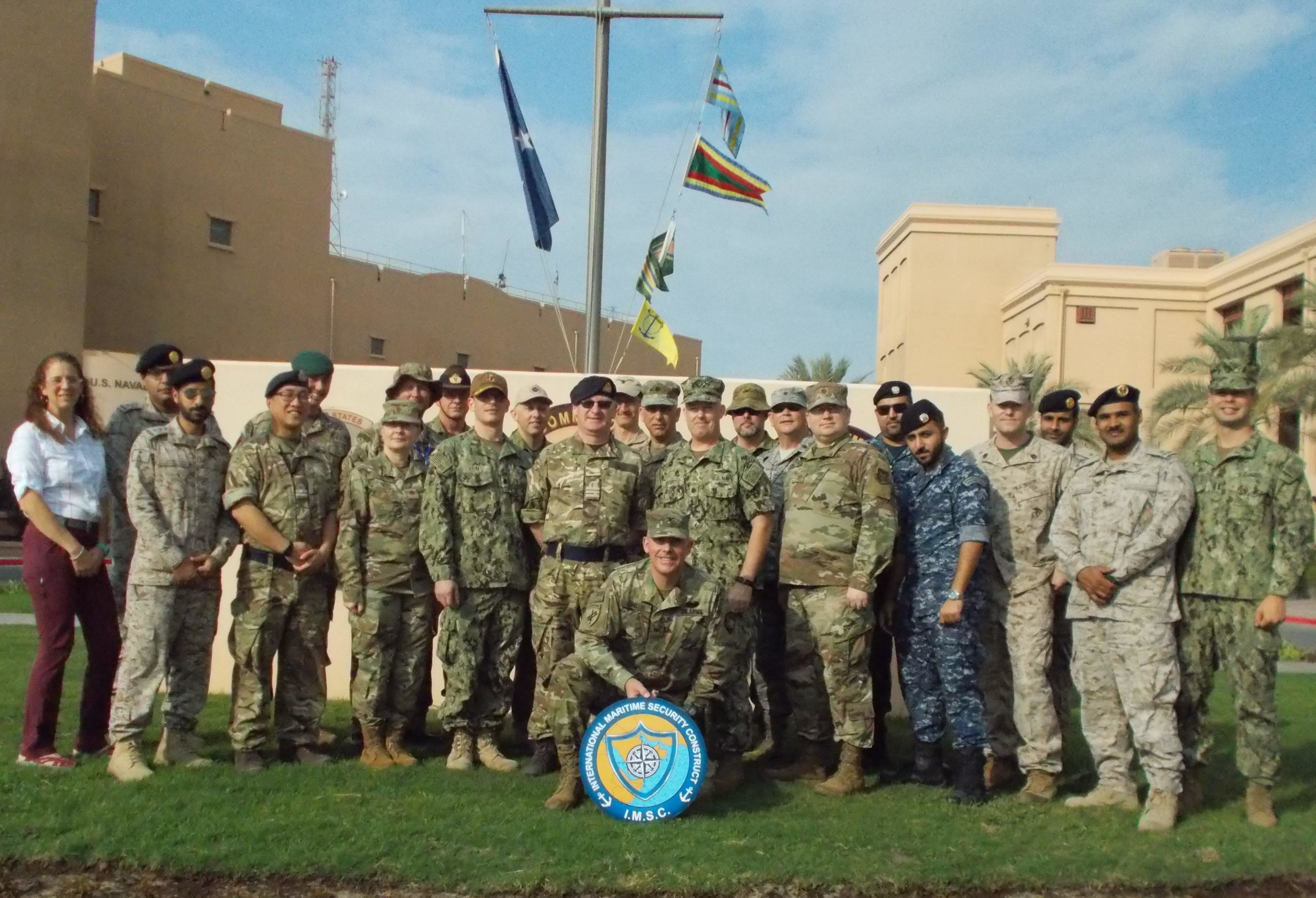
IMSC personnel at headquarters in Bahrain, November 24, 2019

IMSC, through the operational arm of Coalition Task Force SENTINEL, conducts overt security patrols of the waters of the Persian Gulf, Gulf of Oman, Gulf of Aden, and the Southern Red Sea. Significant maritime industry engagement, reconnaissance, and intelligence support enable the IMSC coalition to target areas of concern, and to accomplish their major objectives of deterring state-sponsored malign maritime activity while reassuring the merchant industry by ensuring maritime security and freedom of navigation.

== Command ==
The IMSC is a political construct of willing nations who share common desires to ensure freedom of navigation within the Middle East, therefore, there is no single IMSC Commander. Command and staffing for the operational arm of IMSC, Coalition Task Force SENTINEL, is shared between coalition countries. Commanders are 1-star navy flag officers nominated from within IMSC Coalition nations and typically serve four to six months terms. Coalition Task Force SENTINEL is headquartered in Manama, Bahrain.

US Navy Rear Admiral Alvin "Bull" Holsey (who concurrently served as Commander of US Carrier Strike Group ONE) assumed command for the formation and development of initial operating capability of Coalition Task Force SENTINEL. He was relieved on January 30, 2020, by Royal Navy Commodore James Parkin (the Commander of the UK Littoral Strike Group). At this point, in conjunction with the completion of initial staffing, CTF SENTINEL achieved full operating capability. Parkin handed over command to Royal Navy Commodore Robert Bellfield in April 2020.

	Name	Service	Photo	Term began	Term ended	Notes
1.	Rear Admiral Alvin "Bull" Holsey	United States Navy		November 7, 2019	January 30, 2020	Served concurrently as Commander, Carrier Strike Group ONE.
2.	Commodore James Parkin	Royal Navy		January 30, 2020	April 30, 2020	Served concurrently as Commander Littoral Strike Group
3.	Commodore Robert Bellfield	Royal Navy		April 30, 2020	November 19, 2020	
4.	Commodore Craig Wood	Royal Navy		November 19, 2020	March 30, 2021	
5.	Commodore Adrian Fryer	Royal Navy		March 30, 2021	July 26, 2021	
6.	Commodore Gordon Ruddock	Royal Navy		July 26, 2021	November 18, 2021	
7.	Commodore Donald Mackinnon	Royal Navy		November 18, 2021	August 18, 2022	
8.	Commodore Ben Aldous	Royal Navy		August 18, 2022	May 17, 2023	
9.	Commodore Peter Laughton	Royal Navy		May 17, 2023	Feb 20, 2024	
10.	Commodore Andrew Canale	Royal Navy		Feb 20, 2024	Incumbent	

== Member nations ==
=== Current ===
- Albania - seventh nation to join.
- Bahrain - Founding member.
- Estonia - Estonia joined IMSC in October 2020 as the ninth member.
- Jordan - Jordan joined IMSC in September 2023 as the thirteenth member.
- Latvia - Latvia joined IMSC on 1 December 2022 as the eleventh member.
- Lithuania - Lithuania joined the coalition in March 2020 as the eighth member.
- Romania - Joined 26 March 2022
- Saudi Arabia
- United Arab Emirates
- United Kingdom - Founding member.
- United States - Founding member.
- Seychelles - Joined the coalition on 19 October 2022 as the tenth member.

=== Former ===
- Australia - Founding member. Australia concluded its contribution on 29 December 2020.

== See also ==
- Arab League–Iran relations
- Arab–Israeli alliance
- Iran–Saudi Arabia proxy conflict
- Iran–Israel proxy conflict
- Qatar diplomatic crisis
- Qatar–Saudi Arabia diplomatic conflict
- Shia–Sunni relations
