= K-1 Air Base =

Military airbase in Kirkuk Governorate, Iraq

K-1 Air Base
- Kaywan
- Kirkuk Governorate in Iraq

Site information
- Type: Military Airbase
- Owner: Ministry of Defence (Iraq)
- Operator: Iraqi Army

Location
- Shown within Iraq
- Coordinates: 35°30′45″N 44°17′03″E

Site history
- Built: 2003
- In use: 2003 – present

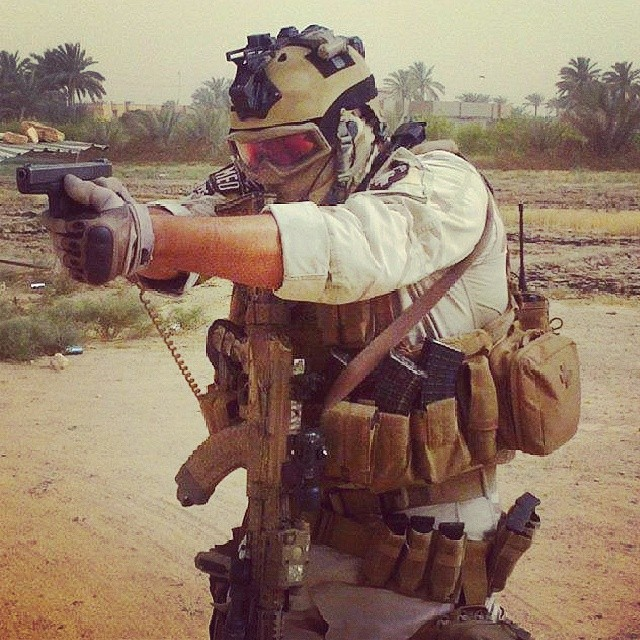
An Iraqi soldier while training in the K1 military camp

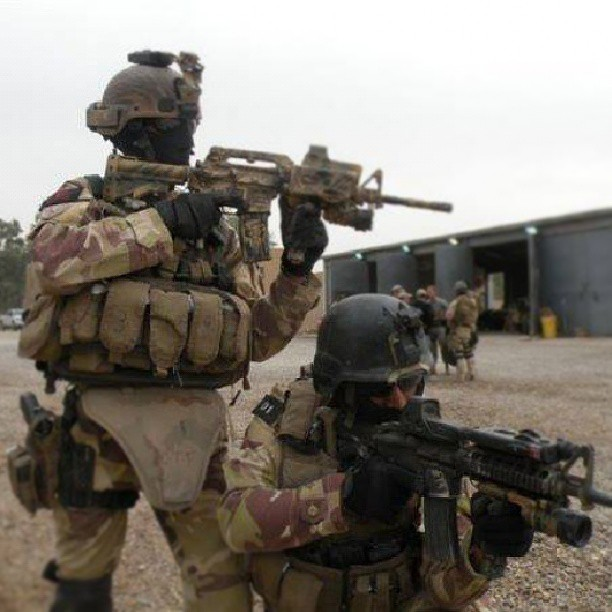
2 Iraqi soldiers after finishing training in the K1 military camp

K-1 Air Base, or Kaywan, is an Iraqi Air Force base and military base in the Kirkuk Governorate of Iraq. It was captured by Coalition forces during Operation Iraqi Freedom in 2003, later serving as the headquarters of the 12th Division of the Iraqi Army.

Following the Islamic State invasion of Iraq, the base was briefly under the control of ISIS and then the Kurdish Peshmerga, until October 16, 2017, when the base was retaken by Iraqi special forces during the Battle of Kirkuk.

== History ==
K-1 was a primary air base for the Iraqi Air Force prior to Operation Iraqi Freedom. It is named after the pumping station at mile 0 (at the Kirkuk oil field) of the Kirkuk-Haifa oil pipeline that was commissioned in 1934.

=== Iraq war 2003–2011 ===
It was used as a Contingency Operating Location by the United States Army after the 2003 U.S. invasion.

During the American presence in Iraq, U.S. and Iraqi forces used training centers at K1 as hubs for combined instruction between U.S. soldiers and various units of Iraqi Security Forces, including Iraqi Army infantry and route clearance units.

"This base will eventually be turned over from Location Command to the 12th Division," said Hall. “The 12th IA is planning on using the K1 facility to support a new tank regiment that is forming. The regiment is not on the ground yet, but it is in the working for the future.”

Soldiers of Company C, 1st Brigade Special Troops Battalion and 101st Brigade Support Battalion, 1st Advise and Assist Task Force, 1st Infantry Division, vacated and transferred control of Contingency Operating Location K1 to Iraq Security Forces, July 25, 2011.

=== 2014–present ===
During the Northern Iraq offensive (August 2014) by the Islamic State of Iraq and the Levant, the 12th Division of the Iraqi Army, consisting of over 12,000 soldiers, fled this base. It was briefly captured by the Islamic State but they were swiftly pushed out by the Kurdish Peshmerga. During this period the base suffered looting both by IS and local residents.

The base has since hosted military personnel from multiple countries participating in the coalition war against the Islamic State of Iraq and the Levant, including Americans, Italians, French, Norwegians and others. There were reportedly American soldiers present at the base, training and advising Peshmerga.

On May 7, 2017, at least two soldiers were killed and six injured when multiple Islamic State suicide bombers attacked the base.

On October 16, 2017 the base was taken back from Kurdish control by Iraqi special forces during the Battle of Kirkuk (2017).

On December 27, 2019, around 7:20 pm, a rocket attack targeting the base killed a U.S. civilian contractor and wounded several American and Iraqi personnel. The attack was suspected to be conducted by Iran-backed militants of Kata'ib Hezbollah. That led to retaliatory airstrikes conducted by United States in Iraq and Syria, killing 25 Kata'ib Hezbollah militiamen.

The United States Army left the air base on March 29, 2020, and it has since been under the control of the Iraqi armed forces.
