= List of assassinations by the United States =

This is a list of individuals who have been the targets of assassination by the United States. American authorities usually define these killings as 'targeted killings'.

== Successful assassinations ==
Target	Position	Date	Location	Country	Nationality	Method	Notes
Charlemagne Péralte	Supreme commander of the Cacos.	1919-11-01	Near Sainte-Suzanne	Haiti		Shooting.	
Isoroku Yamamoto	Gensui of the Imperial Japanese Navy, Commander-in-Chief of the Combined Fleet, mastermind of the Attack on Pearl Harbor.	1943-04-18	Bougainville Island	Territory of New Guinea	Empire of Japan	Plane shot down.	Part of Operation Vengeance.
Viet Cong operatives	Various.	1966–1972	Various	South Vietnam	North Vietnam	Torture murder.	Part of Phoenix Program.
Thai Khac Chuyen	South Vietnamese secret agent and translator	1969-06-20	Nha Trang	South Vietnam		Drugged and shot.	
Fred Hampton and Mark Clark	Chairman of the Illinois chapter of the Black Panther Party (F. Hampton).	1969-12-04	Chicago, Illinois	United States		Shooting.	
Qaed Salim Sinan al-Harethi	Participant in the USS Cole bombing.	2002-11-03	Sanaa	Yemen		Drone strike.	Killed alongside 5 others in the 2002 Marib airstrike, including American citizen Kamal Derwish.
Various Iraqi insurgent groups including Al-Qaeda in Iraq, ex-Ba'athists (FRLs), Special Groups backed by Iran etc.	Various, 1,000+ HVTs assassinated.	2003–2009	Throughout Iraq	Iraq	Various	Drone/air strikes, sniper operations, bombings, raids, etc.	Assassination campaign carried out by JSOC and CIA paramilitaries in secret to quell the anti-U.S. insurgency in Iraq.
Naik Muhammad Wazir	Pro-Taliban militant leader.	2004-06-18	South Waziristan, Khyber Pakhtunkhwa	Pakistan		Drone strike.	
Haitham al-Yemeni	Explosives expert for Al-Qaeda.	2005-05-08	North Waziristan	Pakistan	Yemen	Drone strike.	
Abu Hamza Rabia	Third highest Al-Qaeda leader.	2005-12-01	North Waziristan	Pakistan	Egypt	Drone strike.	
Abu Musab al-Zarqawi	Leader of Al Qaeda in Iraq.	2006-06-07	Baqubah, Diyala Governorate	Iraq	Jordan	Air strike.	JSOC air strike.
Abu Laith al-Libi	Senior commander of Al-Qaeda in Afghanistan.	2008-01-29	North Waziristan	Pakistan	Libya	Drone strike.	
Imad Mughniya	Deputy commander of Hezbollah and assassin.	2008-02-12	Damascus	Syria	Lebanon	Car bombing.	Joint C.I.A.–Mossad operation.
Abu Khabab al-Masri	Head of Al-Qaeda chemical weapons programme.	2008-07-28	South Waziristan	Pakistan	Egypt	Drone strike.	
Abu Wafa al Saudi	Involved in Al-Qaeda logistics.	2008-09-04				Drone strike.	
Abu Haris	Al-Qaeda commander.	2008-09-08	North Waziristan District	Pakistan	Unknown	Drone strike.	
Khalid Habib	Senior member of Al-Qaeda.	2008-10-16	near Taparghai	Pakistan	Egypt	Drone strike.	
Mohammad Hasan Khalil al-Hakim	Head of Al-Qaeda propaganda.	2008-10-31	North Waziristan	Pakistan	Egypt	Drone strike.	
Abu Zubair al-Masri	Explosives expert for Al-Qaeda.	2008-11-22	North Waziristan	Pakistan	Egypt	Drone strike.	
Rashid Rauf	Senior member of Al-Qaeda.	2008-11-22	North Waziristan	Pakistan	United Kingdom	Drone strike.	
Fahid Mohammed Ally Msalam	Two of the perpetrators of the 1998 United States embassy bombings.	2009-01-01	Karikot, South Waziristan	Pakistan	Kenya	Drone strike.	
Sheikh Ahmed Salim Swedan	Two of the perpetrators of the 1998 United States embassy bombings.	2009-01-01	Karikot, South Waziristan	Pakistan	Kenya	Drone strike.	
Baitullah Mehsud	Leader of Tehrik-i-Taliban.	2009-08-05	South Waziristan	Pakistan	Pakistan	Drone strike.	
Tohir Yoʻldosh	Leader of Islamic Movement of Uzbekistan.	2009-08-27	Zhob, Balochistan	Pakistan	Uzbekistan	Drone strike.	
Najmiddin Jalolov	Leader of Islamic Jihad Union.	2009-09-14	Near Mir Ali, North Waziristan	Pakistan	Uzbekistan	Drone strike.	
Saleh al-Somali	Senior members of Al-Qaeda.	2009-12-08	Federally Administered Tribal Areas	Pakistan	Somalia	Drone strike.	
Abdullah Said al Libi	Senior members of Al-Qaeda.	2009-12-17	North Waziristan	Pakistan	Libya	Drone strike.	
Sa'ad bin Laden	One of Osama bin Laden's sons.	2009	Unspecified	Pakistan	Saudi Arabia	Drone strike.	
Ahmed Mohammed Hamed Ali	Participant in the 1998 United States embassy bombings.	2010	Unspecified	Pakistan	Egypt	Drone strike.	
Qari Mohammad Zarif	Leader of Fada'iyan-e Islam.	2010-02-24	Khyber Pakhtunkhwa	Pakistan	Pakistan	Drone strike.	
Saeed al-Masri	Head of Al-Qaeda finances.	2010-05-21	Boya, North Waziristan	Pakistan	Egypt	Drone strike.	
Hamza al-Jufi	Leader of Jundallah.	2010-06-29	Near Wana, Khyber Pakhtunkhwa	Pakistan	Egypt	Drone strike.	
Sheikh al-Fatah	Leader of Al-Qaeda in Afghanistan and Pakistan.	2010-09-25				Drone strike.	
Abu Ibrahim	Leader of Fursan-i-Mohammed.	2010-10-06				Drone strike.	
Sheik Fateh al Masri	Top commander of the Lashkar al Zil.	2010-12				Drone strike.	
Abu Zaid al-Iraqi	Head of Al-Qaeda finances in Pakistan.	2011-02-20				Drone strike.	
Osama bin Laden	Leader of Al-Qaeda, mastermind of the September 11 attacks.	2011-05-02	Bilal Town, Abbottabad	Pakistan	Saudi Arabia	United States Navy SEALs raid.	Part of Operation Neptune Spear.
Ilyas Kashmiri	Senior member of Al-Qaeda.	2011-06-03	North Waziristan	Pakistan	Pakistan	Drone strike.	
Atiyah Abd al-Rahman	Osama bin Laden's Chief of Staff.	2011-08-22	North Waziristan	Pakistan	Libya	Drone strike.	
Abu Hafs al-Shahri	Al-Qaeda commander.	2011-09-11	Mir Ali, Khyber Pakhtunkhwa	Pakistan	Saudi Arabia	Drone strike.	
Anwar al-Awlaki	Members of Al-Qaeda.	2011-09-30	Al Jawf	Yemen	United States	Drone strike.	
Abu Miqdad al Masri	Members of Al-Qaeda.	2011-10-14				Drone strike.	
Aslam Awan	Deputy leader of external operations for Al-Qaeda.	2012-01-10				Drone strike.	
Bader Mansoor	Leader of an Al-Qaeda affiliate.	2012-02-09				Drone strike.	
Fahd al-Quso	Officer of Al-Qaeda and facilitator	2012-05-06	Rafdh district	Yemen		Drone strike.	
Usman Adil	Leader of Islamic Movement of Uzbekistan.	2012-04-29	Miranshah, North Waziristan	Pakistan	Uzbekistan	Drone strike.	
Abu Yahya al-Libi	Senior member of Al-Qaeda.	2012-06-04	Mir Ali	Pakistan	Libya	Drone strike.	
Abdul Shakoor al-Turkistani	Turkistan Islamic Party.	2012-08-24	North Waziristan	Pakistan	China	Drone strike.	
Hassan Ghul	Al-Qaeda courier	2012-10-01	North Waziristan	Pakistan	Pakistan	Drone strike.	
Yaseen al Somali	Deputy Commander for Al-Qaeda training.	2013-01-08	Haider Khel, North Waziristan	Pakistan	Lebanon	Drone strike.	
Abu Ubaydah Abdullah al-Adam	Commander for Al-Qaeda intelligence.	2013-04-14				Drone strike.	
Abu Saif al Jaziri	Senior commander for training of Al-Qaeda.	2013-07-03				Drone strike.	
Sangeen Zadran	Operational commander of Haqqani network	2013-09-05	North Waziristan	Pakistan	Afghanistan	Drone strike.	
Hakimullah Mehsud	Emir of Tehrik-i-Taliban Pakistan	2013-11-01	Dande Darpa Khel, North Waziristan	Pakistan	Pakistan	Drone strike.	
Ahmed Abdi Godane	Leader of Al-Shabaab.	2014-09-01	Hawaay, Lower Shabelle	Somalia		Drone strike.	
Sheikh Imran Ali Siddi	Leader of Al-Qaeda in the Indian subcontinent.	2014-10-11	Tirah, North Waziristan	Pakistan	Pakistan	Drone strike.	
Umar Farooq	Commander of Al-Qaeda.	2014-12-07	Dattakhel, North Waziristan	Pakistan	Pakistan	Drone strike.	
Adam Yahiye Gadahn	Al-Qaeda spokesperson and media advisor.	2015-01-19	Waziristan	Pakistan	United States	Drone strike.	
Adan Garar	Suspected of a role in the Westgate Mall attack.	2015-03	Diinsoor	Somalia		Drone strike.	
Ibrahim Sulayman Muhammad Arbaysh	Senior members of Al-Qaeda in the Arabian Peninsula.	2015-04-12	Hadhramaut	Yemen	Saudi Arabia	Drone strike.	
Nasser bin Ali al-Ansi	Senior members of Al-Qaeda in the Arabian Peninsula.	2015-05-07	Mukalla	Yemen		Drone strike.	
Akhtar Mansur	Supreme leader of the Taliban	2016-05-21	Ahmad Wal, Balochistan	Pakistan	Afghanistan	Drone strike.	
Hamza bin Laden	Son of Osama bin Laden, emerging leader of al-Qaeda	2017-2019	Afghanistan/Pakistan region	Afghanistan	Saudi Arabia	Drone strike.	Details remain scarce.
Qasem Soleimani	Commander of the Quds Force of the Islamic Revolutionary Guard Corps.	2020-01-03	Baghdad	Iraq	Iran	Drone strike.	Soleimani was the second most powerful person in Iran.
Abu Mahdi al-Muhandis	Deputy Chairman of the Popular Mobilization Forces.	2020-01-03	Baghdad	Iraq	Iraq	Drone strike.	One of Iraq’s most powerful men.
Qasim al-Raymi	Leader of Al-Qaeda in the Arabian Peninsula.	2020-02-07	Wald Rabi' District, Al Bayda Governorate	Yemen		Drone strike.	
Maher al-Agal	Leader of ISIS in Syria.	2022-07-12	Jindires, Aleppo Governorate	Syria		Drone strike.	
Ayman al-Zawahiri	Leader of Al-Qaeda.	2022-07-31	Kabul	Afghanistan	Egypt	Drone strike.	
Usamah al-Muhajir	Leader of ISIS forces in East Syria.	2023-07-09	Aleppo Governorate	Syria	Syria	Drone strike.	
Mushtaq Talib Al-Saeedi (Abu Taqwa)	Senior Commander of Harakat Hezbollah al-Nujaba.	2024-01-04	Baghdad	Iraq	Iraq	Drone strike.	
Wissam al-Saadi (Abu Baqir)	Senior Commander of Kata'ib Hezbollah.	2024-02-07	Baghdad	Iraq	Iraq	Drone strike.	He was in charge of Kata'ib Hezbollah’s operations in Syria.
Arkan al-Alawi	Senior Kata'ib Hezbollah commander and intelligence operative.	2024-02-07	Baghdad	Iraq	Iraq	Drone strike.	
Abdallah Makki Muslih al Rifai (Abu Khadijah)	ISIS’s chief of global operations, the second in command in Iraq.	2025-03-13	Al Anbar Province	Iraq	Iraq	Air strike.	
Ali Khamenei	Iran's Supreme Leader.	2026-02-28	Tehran	Iran		Air strike.	Part of Operation Epic Fury.
Abu Hassan Al-Fariji	Kata'ib Hezbollah commander.	2026-03-04	Babil Province	Iraq		Drone strike.	
Abu Ali al-Askari	Senior Security Commander of KH	2026-03-14	Baghdad	Iraq		Air strike.	
Niño Guerrero	Leader of Tren de Aragua, drug trafficker.	2026-06-12	Sifontes Municipality	Venezuela		Air strike.	

== Failed attempts ==
Target	Position	Date	Location	Country	Nationality	Method	Notes
Muammar Gaddafi	Brotherly Leader and Guide of the Revolution of Libya.	1986-04-15	Bab al-Azizia	Libya		Air strike.	Part of the 1986 United States bombing of Libya.
Saddam Hussein	President of Iraq	2003-03-19	Dora Farm Complex, Dora, Baghdad	Iraq		Air strike.	The George W. Bush presidency authorized the U.S. military to launch "decapitation strikes", prior to the invasion of Iraq.
Ahmad Shah	Leader of an anti-coalition militia (ACM)	2005-06-27	Sawtalo Sar, Kunar	Afghanistan		SEAL Team and U.S. Marines raid.	Part of Operation Red Wings, resulted in the death of 19 U.S. soldiers including a 4-man SEAL reconnaissance team.
Abdul Reza Shahlai	IRGC-QF Brigadier General	2020-01-03	Sana’a	Yemen	Iran	Drone strike.	U.S. special operations forces tried to liquidate Shahlai as part of an American effort to cripple the leadership of Iran's Quds Force.

== Planned but unexecuted assassinations ==
Target	Position	Nationality	Method	Notes
Fidel Castro	Prime Minister of Cuba, President of Cuba, and First Secretary of the Cuban Communist Party.	Cuba		See also: CIA assassination attempts on Fidel Castro Reported by the Church Committee.
Patrice Lumumba	Prime Minister of Congo-Leopoldville	Congo-Léopoldville		Reported by the Church Committee.
Rafael Trujillo	President of the Dominican Republic	Dominican Republic		Reported by the Church Committee.
Ngo Dinh Diem	President of South Vietnam	South Vietnam		Reported by the Church Committee.
René Schneider	Commander-in-Chief of the Chilean Army	Chile		Reported by the Church Committee.
Sukarno	President of Indonesia	Indonesia		Reported by the Rockefeller Commission

== See also ==
- Drone strike
- Assassination and targeted killing by the CIA
- List of assassinations
- List of Apartheid South Africa assassinations
- List of assassinations by the Gaddafi regime
- List of Israeli assassinations
- List of Iranian assassinations
- List of Soviet and Russian assassinations (disambiguation)
- United States involvement in regime change
- Criticism of United States foreign policy
- U.S. list of most-wanted Iraqis
- U.S. kill or capture strategy in Iraq
- Operation Condor
- Political violence in the United States
