= Assassination of Qasem Soleimani =

2020 assassination in Baghdad, Iraq

- Part of the American-led intervention in Iraq and 2019–2021 Persian Gulf crisis
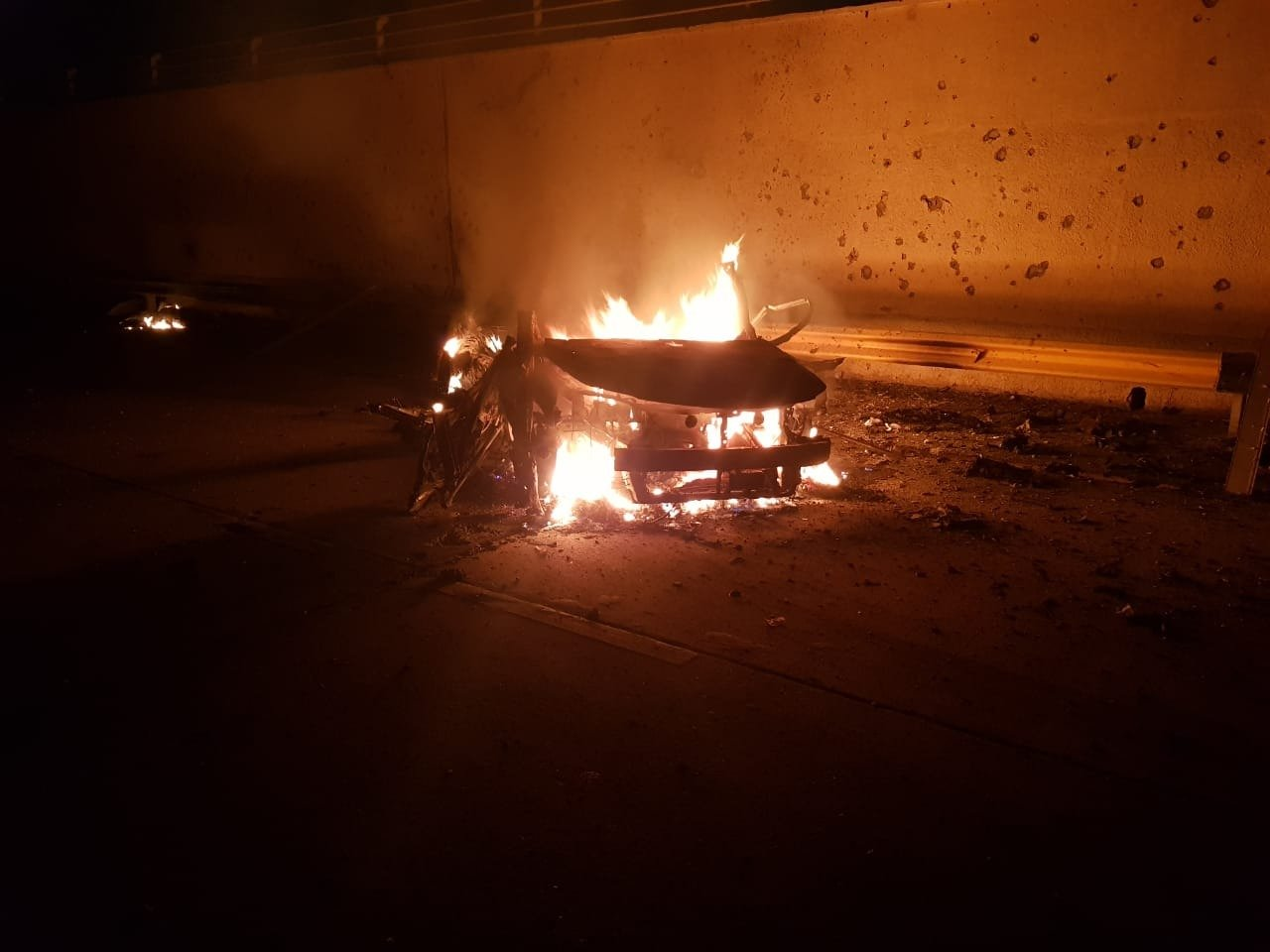
- Remnants of the car Qasem Soleimani was driven in
- Type: Targeted killing, drone strike
- Location: Near Baghdad Airport Road, Baghdad International Airport, Iraq; 33°15′29″N 44°15′22″E
- Planned by: United States
- Target: (Iran) Qasem Soleimani X
- Date: 3 January 2020; 6 years ago About 1:00 a.m. (local time, UTC+3)
- Executed by: United States Air Force; United States Army; Delta Force; ISA; CTG (allegedly)
- Outcome: Successful
- Casualties: 10 killed, including Qasem Soleimani and Abu Mahdi al-Muhandis
- Location in Iraq

On 3 January 2020, Qasem Soleimani, an Iranian major general, was assassinated by an American drone strike ordered by U.S. president Donald Trump near Baghdad International Airport in Iraq, while travelling to meet Iraqi prime minister Adil Abdul-Mahdi.

Soleimani was commander of the Quds Force, one of five branches of Iran's Islamic Revolutionary Guard Corps (IRGC), which is designated as a terrorist organization by both the United States and European Parliament. Soleimani was considered the second most powerful person in Iran, subordinate to Supreme Leader Ali Khamenei, even being considered Khamenei's right-hand man. Five Iraqi nationals and four other Iranian nationals were killed alongside Soleimani, including the deputy chairman of Iraq's Popular Mobilization Forces (PMF) and commander of the Iran-backed Kata'ib Hezbollah militia, Abu Mahdi al-Muhandis. The Pentagon said Soleimani and his troops were "responsible for the deaths of hundreds of American and coalition service members and the wounding of thousands more". However, questions concerning the U.S. military command's level of attribution to the Quds Force for Iraq's domestic production of explosively formed penetrators, to the source of foreign production and "technology and the training on how to use it", and the level of transparency regarding this information at the time of accusation, were raised contemporaneously.

The strike occurred during the 2019–2022 Persian Gulf crisis, which began after the U.S. withdrew from the 2015 nuclear deal with Iran in 2018, reimposed sanctions, and accused Iranian elements of fomenting a campaign to harass U.S. forces in the region in 2019. On 27 December 2019, the K-1 Air Base in Iraq, which hosts Iraqi and U.S. personnel, was attacked, killing an American contractor. The U.S. responded by launching airstrikes across Iraq and Syria, reportedly killing 25 Kata'ib Hezbollah militiamen. Days later, Shia militiamen and their supporters retaliated by attacking the U.S. embassy in the Green Zone.

U.S. officials justified the Soleimani strike saying it was necessary to stop an "imminent attack", though later clarifying the legal justification of the action as being taken "in response to an escalating series of attacks...to protect United States personnel, to deter Iran from conducting or supporting further attacks...and to end Iran's strategic escalation of attacks..." Some experts, including the United Nations special rapporteur on extrajudicial, summary or arbitrary executions, considered the assassination as a likely violation of international law as well as U.S. domestic laws. Iran called the strike an act of "state terrorism". The Iraqi government said the attack undermined its national sovereignty and considered it a breach of its bilateral security agreements with the U.S. and an act of aggression against its officials. On 5 January 2020, the Iraqi parliament passed a non-binding resolution to expel all foreign troops from its territory while, on the same day, Iran took the fifth and last step of reducing commitments to the 2015 international nuclear deal.

Soleimani's killing sharply escalated tensions between the U.S. and Iran. Iranian leaders vowed revenge, while U.S. officials said they would preemptively attack any Iran-backed paramilitary groups in Iraq that they perceived as a threat. Many in the international community reacted with concern and urged restraint and diplomacy. On 8 January 2020, five days after the airstrike, Iran launched a series of missile attacks on U.S. forces based in Iraq, the first known direct engagement between Iran and the U.S. since the naval battle precipitating the Vincennes incident on 3 July 1988. That same day, the IRGC shot down a civilian airliner Ukraine International Airlines Flight 752. Following the shootdown, no additional military actions took place.

== Background ==
=== Assassination as a policy consideration ===
The modern Middle East has seen a number of occasions in which the assassination of high-level government and military figures was attempted, or at least considered. Such instances include United States decapitation strike air raids targeting Libyan leader Muammar Gaddafi in 1986 and Iraqi leader Saddam Hussein in 1991, 1998, and 2003, in addition to killings or attempted killings of non-state terrorist leaders such as Anwar al-Awlaki and Abu Bakr al-Baghdadi. Governments conducting assassinations of foreign leaders and officials was largely frowned upon in prior centuries, but that norm has been weakening over time, especially since World War II. The effectiveness of anti-terrorist "leadership targeting" has become a subject of scholarly debate, especially with regard to whether such killings are actually beneficial to a country's foreign policy goals.

In the wake of the strike against Soleimani, both the topic of further eroding norms and questions regarding effectiveness were raised. The costs and benefits of foreign policy assassinations are difficult to compute, and decisions to go ahead with such actions often reflect the vague, and not always realized, hope that any successor to the targeted person will be less capable against, or will embody policies more favorable toward, the country taking the action.

=== U.S. and Iranian activities in Iraq since 2014 ===
In 2014, the U.S. intervened in Iraq as a part of Operation Inherent Resolve (OIR)–an American-led mission to fight the Islamic State of Iraq and the Levant (ISIL) terror organization–and have been training and operating alongside Iraqi forces as a part of the anti-ISIL coalition. In 2017, ISIL forces in Iraq were largely defeated amidst a civil conflict, with the help of primarily Iran-backed Shia militias—the Popular Mobilization Forces, reporting to the Iraqi prime minister since 2016—and the U.S.-backed Iraqi Armed Forces.

=== Political considerations ===
Concerning the 15-year Joint Comprehensive Plan of Action provisional nuclear deal with Iran, some critics of the treaty argued that Iran could make a nuclear bomb after expiry of the limited-term nuclear deal. U.S. president Donald Trump criticized the nuclear deal, particularly the Obama administration's debt clearance of $1.7 billion to Iran. Tensions rose between Iran and the U.S. in 2018 after Trump unilaterally withdrew from the 2015 nuclear deal and reimposed sanctions against Iran—which severely affected Iran's economy—as a part of his administration's strategy of applying "maximum pressure" against Iran for the purpose of establishing a new nuclear deal.

The Quds Force, which Qasem Soleimani led, has been designated a terrorist organization by Canada, Saudi Arabia, Bahrain, and the U.S. Soleimani himself was sanctioned by the United Nations and the European Union and was on U.S. terror watchlists.

Abu Mahdi al-Muhandis was designated a terrorist by the U.S. in 2009. He was the deputy commander of Iraq's Popular Mobilization Forces (PMF). He also commanded Kata'ib Hezbollah, a 25,000-strong militia considered a terrorist organization by Japan, the United Arab Emirates, and the U.S.

=== Significance of the assassination of Soleimani ===
General Qasem Soleimani was considered the second most powerful person in Iran, behind Iran's Supreme Leader Ayatollah Ali Khamenei, and in his later years enjoyed a near unassailable heroic status, especially with supporters of Tehran's hard-line politics.

Ever since the Iran–Iraq War (1980–88), in which Iran was attacked by Saddam Hussein's Iraq with significant assistance of several Western countries siding with Hussein against Ayatollah Ruhollah Khomeini's Islamic republic in Tehran, with notably the U.S. supplying weapons and intelligence to Iraq, Soleimani had developed into the architect of all of Iran's foreign policies in the Middle East and a key figure in all of Iran's foreign and defence policies. He provided crucial support to President Bashar al-Assad's regime during the Syrian Civil War. In his 2008 letter to the U.S. general David Petraeus, then commander of the Multi-National Force in Iraq, he asserted: "General Petraeus, you must know that I, Qasem Soleimani, am in charge of the Iranian policies concerning Iraq, Lebanon, Gaza and Afghanistan". Iran's alleged ties to the Taliban were cited as part of the justification for the assassination of Soleimani. That made his killing by the U.S. on 3 January 2020 a significant aggravation of the existing tensions between the U.S. and Iran.

In the days after the assassination of Soleimani, Iran's leaders vowed "shattering revenge" "on places and at times where the U.S. don't expect it".

==== Prior threats against Soleimani ====
Responses to Qasem Soleimani's perceived influence in Iraq and abroad had been a topic of debate amongst U.S. officials for many years. In August 2007, as U.S. military officials attempted to learn more about the leadership of the Iran-backed proxy groups operating in Iraq, they received a message relayed through the Iraqi Minister of State for National Security, that Soleimani wanted them to know that he was "the sole decision-maker on Iranian activities in Iraq".

According to a report by NBC News, Eric Edelman, a career foreign services officer with senior diplomatic posts at the time, U.S. commander Army General George Casey, considered designating Soleimani and Quds Force officers enemy combatants, thus making them subject to military action. However, the idea was ruled out over concerns of opening a "new front" in the war. Edelman stated, "There were a lot of us who thought he should be taken out. But at the end of the day, they decided not to do that," due to concern of starting simultaneous conflict with Iran.

Former U.S. presidents George W. Bush and Barack Obama both considered and rejected targeting Qasem Soleimani, reasoning that it would escalate to a full-scale war. Retired CIA officer Marc Polymeropoulos told The New York Times that Soleimani, unlike other adversaries killed by the U.S., felt comfortable operating in the open and was not hard to find. He often took photographs of himself and openly taunted U.S. forces.

In October 2007, the Bush administration was the first to designate Soleimani a terrorist on the basis of his involvement with the Iranian Revolutionary Guard Corps and Quds Force, and the increasing recognition of the role they played in the Iraq conflict. According to an interview with a PolitiFact journalist, retired U.S. Army Colonel Frank Sobchak, said that around the same time U.S. special forces had planned for his capture, but the mission was not approved by senior officials. He said, "Individuals that we talked to in senior positions of the U.S. government told us that with support for the war at an all-time low in 2007, the Bush administration recognized the importance of Soleimani to the war, but was not willing to risk the political capital and repercussions that could occur from expanding the war to that level."

These activities preceded escalating concern and terror designations of Soleimani by the Obama administration. The first such designation was made in May 2011, in response to Soleimani's assistance to the Syrian General Intelligence Directorate in the violent suppression of Syrian protestors. The second, and more serious designation by the Obama administration came in October 2011, after a plot was revealed in which four senior Islamic Revolutionary Guard Corps-Quds Force (IRGC-QF) officers were planning to assassinate the Saudi Arabian Ambassador while in the United States, under the supervision of Soleimani.

In September 2015, radio host Hugh Hewitt asked Donald Trump about Soleimani. After initially confusing him with a Kurdish leader, Trump argued that leaders like Soleimani would be dead under his administration.

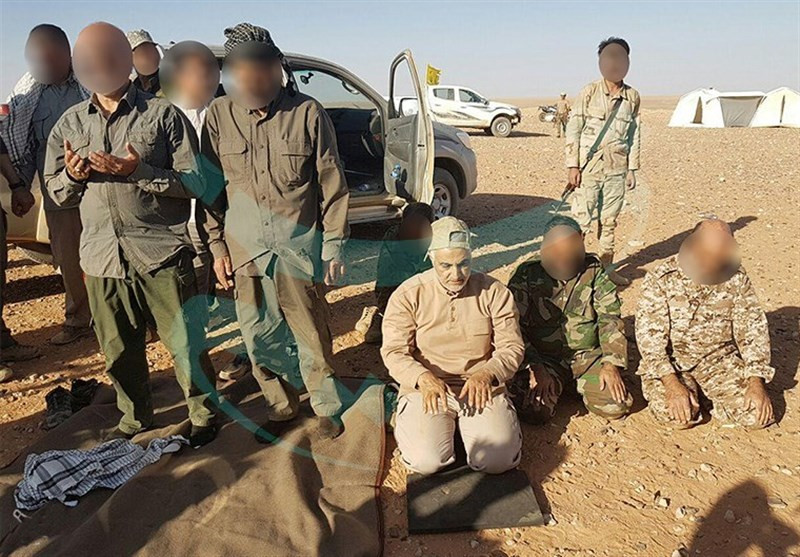
Qasem Soleimani praying alongside Iranian-backed militiamen in the Syrian Desert during the Syrian Civil War

It was reported in 2015 that Israel was "on the verge" of assassinating Soleimani on Syrian soil; however, the U.S., during the Obama administration's negotiations for the Joint Comprehensive Plan of Action, thwarted the operation by revealing it to the Iranian officials.

On 25 August 2019, Israeli Foreign Minister Israel Katz said, "Israel is acting to strike the head of the Iranian snake and uproot its teeth ... Iran is the head of the snake and Qassem Soleimani, the commander of the Revolutionary Guards Quds Force, is the snake's teeth." In October 2019, Hossein Taeb, chief of the Intelligence Organization of the Islamic Revolutionary Guard Corps, told the press that his agency had arrested an unspecified number of people, allegedly foiling a plot by Israeli and Arab agencies to assassinate Soleimani. He said they had planned to "buy a property adjacent to the grave of Soleimani's father and rig it with explosives to kill the commander". He added the way of the assassination would have appeared as part of an internal Iranian power struggle to "trigger a religious war inside Iran". Yossi Cohen, chief of the Israeli foreign intelligence agency (Mossad), said in response, "Soleimani knows that his assassination is not impossible."

On 2 January 2020, The New York Times author and former National Security Council senior director Steven Simon wrote in a comment: "What if the former commander of Iran's Revolutionary Guards, Qassim Suleimani, visits Baghdad for a meeting and you know the address? The temptations to use hypersonic missiles will be many."

== Prelude ==
In early October 2019, according to two Iraqi militia commanders and two security sources who spoke with Reuters staff, Iranian Major-General Qasem Soleimani met in Baghdad to discuss a change in strategy with Iraqi Shiite militia allies. The new focus of strategy was to be an increase in targeted rocket attacks on U.S. forces in Iraq, with the intended effect of provoking an antagonistic U.S. military response that would divert political pressure from Iran. Leading up to the meeting, there had been increasing anti-Iran sentiment amongst the local Iraqi population, culminating in prolonged and vocal anti-Iran protests, with some demonstrators banging their shoes on raised portraits of Ayatollah Ali Khamenei. At least 400 protestors were killed and an estimated 20,000 wounded. Soleimani decided to step up attacks on U.S. forces. He chose Kata'ib Hezbollah because the group "would be difficult to detect by the Americans" and could use Iran-provided scout drones for more precision in target selection for the rocket attacks. The US was becoming increasingly concerned at Iran's influence within the Iraqi government.

On 27 December 2019, the K-1 Air Base in Kirkuk Province, Iraq—one of many Iraqi military bases that host Operation Inherent Resolve coalition personnel—was attacked by more than 30 rockets, killing an Iraqi-American U.S. defense contractor, and injuring multiple U.S. and Iraqi service members. The U.S. blamed the Iranian-backed Kata'ib Hezbollah militia for the attack. Furthermore, a senior U.S. official, who spoke to reporters on condition of anonymity, said there had been a campaign of 11 attacks on Iraqi bases hosting OIR personnel in the two months before the 27 December incident, many of which the U.S. also attributed to Kata'ib Hezbollah. On 29 December 2019, retaliatory U.S. airstrikes targeted five Kata'ib Hezbollah weapon storage facilities and command and control locations in Iraq and Syria. 25 militia members died and 55 were wounded.

On 31 December 2019, after a funeral was held for the Kata'ib Hezbollah militiamen, dozens of Iraqi Shia militiamen and their supporters marched into the Green Zone and surrounded the U.S. embassy compound. Dozens of the demonstrators then smashed through a main door of the checkpoint, set fire to the reception area, raised Popular Mobilization Units militia flags, left anti-American posters, and sprayed anti-American graffiti. U.S. president Donald Trump accused Iran of orchestrating the attack on the embassy and added that they would be held "fully responsible". Iran's foreign ministry denied they were behind the protests.

=== Pentagon evaluation ===
The Pentagon evaluated Soleimani as the leader of Tehran's attacks on U.S. bases in Iraq, including the 2019 K-1 Air Base attack and killing of a U.S. civilian, and the shooting down of a U.S. aerial vehicle. Regarding the decision to kill Soleimani, the U.S. focused on both his past actions and a deterrent to his future action as the Pentagon announced that "he was actively developing plans to attack U.S. diplomats and service members in Iraq and throughout the region."

=== Trump briefing ===
According to an unidentified senior U.S. official, sometime after the bombing of Kata'ib Hezbollah in late December 2019, a security briefing was convened at President Trump's Mar-a-Lago estate where he and his advisors, including Secretary of State Mike Pompeo, Defense Secretary Mark Esper, and chairman of the joint chiefs of staff General Mark Milley discussed how to respond to Iran's alleged role in sponsoring anti-U.S. attacks in Iraq. Reportedly, the targeted killing of Iranian general Qasem Soleimani, whom U.S. officials regarded as a facilitator of attacks on U.S. personnel in Iraq, was listed as the "most extreme option" of many options on a briefing slide, reflecting an alleged practice among Pentagon officials whereby a very extreme option is presented to presidents so as to make other options appear more palatable. Trump chose the option to kill Soleimani, prompting the CIA and other U.S. intelligence agencies that had tracked Soleimani's whereabouts for years to locate him on a flight from Damascus to Baghdad, reportedly to hold meetings with Iraqi militiamen. The air strike would have been called off if Soleimani had been on his way to meet with Iraqi government officials aligned with the U.S.

Trump did not notify the top congressional leaders of the Gang of Eight in advance of the strike. Senator Lindsey Graham indicated Trump had discussed the matter with him in advance of the strike, as he was visiting the president at his Mar-a-Lago estate. According to journalist Bob Woodward, four days before the strike, Graham tried to change Trump's mind as they discussed the decision while playing golf.

==== Trump's alleged motivation for the strike ====
According to unidentified sources cited by The New York Times, Trump initially rejected the option to target Soleimani on 28 December 2019, but made the decision after being angered by television news reports of the U.S. embassy in Baghdad being attacked by armed Iranian-backed militiamen, namely Kata'ib Hezbollah and the Popular Mobilization Forces, on 31 December. This followed a 27 December rocket attack by Kata'ib Hezbollah on an airbase in Kirkuk that killed an American civilian contractor and injured four U.S. service members and two Iraqi security forces personnel. By late 2 January, Trump had finalized his decision of the most extreme option his advisors had provided him, which reportedly "stunned" top Pentagon officials. The New York Times report cited unidentified U.S. officials as saying the intelligence regarding Soleimani's alleged plot against the U.S. was "thin" and that the Ayatollah had not approved any operation for Soleimani to carry out. However, General Milley said the intelligence was "clear and unambiguous" with a time frame of "days, weeks". U.S. Secretary of State Mike Pompeo and Vice President Mike Pence were reportedly the most hawkish voices arguing to retaliate against Iran. Pence later wrote that Soleimani was plotting "imminent" attacks on U.S. persons, but provided no evidence of this. U.S. National Security Advisor Robert O'Brien insisted that Soleimani "was plotting to kill, to attack American facilities, and diplomats, soldiers, sailors, airmen and Marines were located at those facilities".

In contrast to the Times' reporting, according to unidentified sources cited by The Washington Post on 4 January 2020, Trump wanted to kill Soleimani (Note: U.S. President Donald Trump claimed that Soleimani was responsible of planting thousands of roadside bombs in Iraq and Afghanistan, by saying: "He was the king of the roadside bombs, great percentages of people don't have legs right now and arms because of this son of a bitch [Qassem Soleimani]". Moreover, British Prime Minister Boris Johnson mentioned that Soleimani supplied "improvised explosive devices to terrorists, which I'm afraid killed and maimed British troops".) to avoid the appearance of weakness amid the ongoing Persian Gulf crisis, since his decision to call off an airstrike against Iran in summer 2019 after the downing of a U.S. drone had led to what he perceived as negative media coverage. Lawmakers and aides who had spoken to him told the Post that the president also had the 2012 Benghazi attack in Libya on his mind. Furthermore, Mike Pompeo (Note: According to BBC, U.S. Congressman Mike Pompeo applied in 2016 for an Iranian travel visa at the Embassy of Pakistan, Washington, D.C., to monitor the situation there, but his efforts were in vain.) had discussed killing Soleimani with Trump months before the strike, but did not garner support from the president or the defense team then in place. However, according to The Wall Street Journal on 10 January 2020, Trump purportedly told associates after the strike that he was motivated to strike Soleimani for domestic political gain, particularly to sway Republican senators to support him in his upcoming Senate impeachment trial.

On the day of the strike, Pompeo asserted the attack was ordered by Trump to disrupt an "imminent attack" by Soleimani operatives, although subsequent reports on that rationale were mixed. On 9 January, Trump said "We did it because they were looking to blow up our embassy. We also did it for other reasons that were very obvious. Somebody died, one of our military people died. People were badly wounded just a week before." On 10 January, Trump claimed that Soleimani had been planning attacks on four U.S. embassies in the Middle East. Afterwards several members of Congress, including Mike Lee and Chris Murphy, claimed that the Trump administration had not informed them of this in the intelligence briefing on the strike. Three days after Trump's remarks, Defense Secretary Mark Esper clarified that, although "there was evidence" of a plot against the U.S. embassy in Baghdad, the president "didn't cite intelligence" about the other three embassies he mentioned, and that the president instead shared his belief that there "probably could have been" a plot against those embassies.

On 18 January, CNN reported that President Trump claimed that Soleimani was "saying bad things about our country", then he asked "How much of this shit do we have to listen to? ... How much are we going to listen to?"

=== Soleimani's trip to Iraq ===
Adil Abdul-Mahdi, the prime minister of Iraq, said he was scheduled on the day of the attack to meet Soleimani, who was delivering Iran's response to a previous message from Saudi Arabia that Iraq had relayed. According to Abdul-Mahdi, Trump had called him to request that Abdul-Mahdi mediate the conflict between the U.S. and Iran before the drone strike.

== Assassination ==
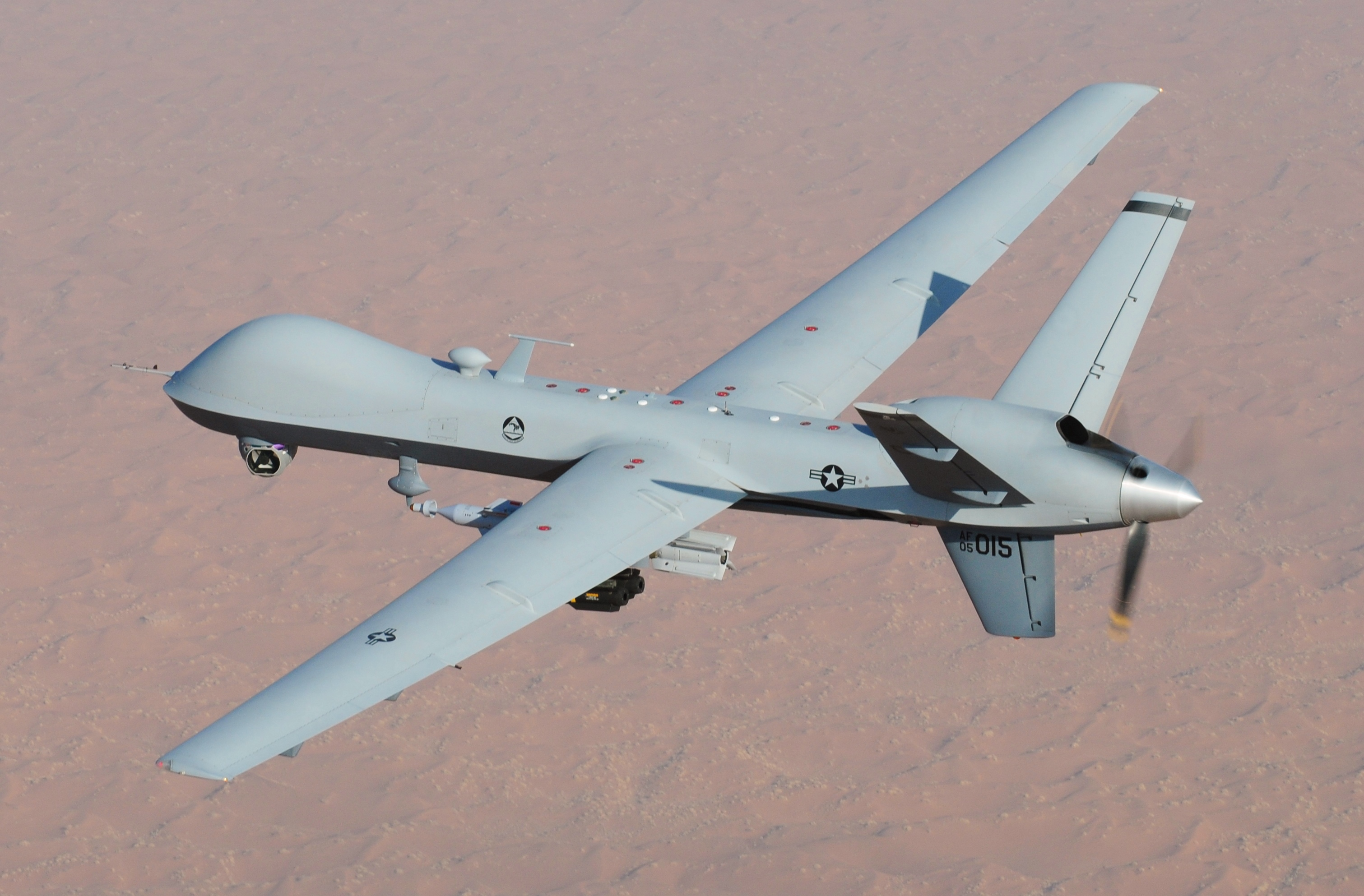
An MQ-9 Reaper drone delivered the payload that killed Soleimani.

On 3 January 2020, at 12:32 a.m. local time, Soleimani's plane, a Cham Wings Airlines Airbus A320, arrived at Baghdad International Airport from Damascus International Airport after being delayed for two hours for unknown reasons. (Note: Soleimani used to avoid using his private plane because of increasing concerns regarding his own security, according to an Iraqi security source familiar with his security precautions.) An MQ-9 Reaper drone of the U.S. Air Force and other military aircraft loitered above the area (Note: Investigators in Iraq and Syria have concentrated on how collaborators inside the Damascus and Baghdad airports aided the U.S. military to track and pinpoint Soleimani's position. In addition, NBC News reported that Israel helped in confirming the details provided by the informants. In June 2020, an Iranian citizen, Seyed Mahmoud Mousavi Majd, was sentenced to death for leaking information that led to Suleimani's death; he was executed a month later. In May 2021, Yahoo! News reported that three teams of Delta Force operators were present during the operation, including sniper teams positioned nearby. Israelis, who had access to Soleimani's phone numbers, provided them to the Americans who traced him to Baghdad and Kurdish spec ops at the Baghdad International Airport helped to identify Soleimani. Later on, as two Hellfire missiles hit Soleimani's vehicle, the other vehicle in the motorcade tried to escape before being hit by another missile.) as Soleimani and other pro-Iranian paramilitary figures, including Abu Mahdi al-Muhandis, deputy chairman of Iraq's Popular Mobilization Forces, entered a Toyota Avalon and Hyundai Starex and departed the airport towards downtown Baghdad. At 12:47 a.m., the Reaper drone launched several missiles, (Note: The MQ-9 Reaper drone was probably equipped with AGM-114 Hellfire missiles.) striking the convoy on an access road as it departed the airport, engulfing the two cars in flames, killing 10 people.

As news of the event broke, the U.S. Department of Defense issued a statement which said that the strike was carried out "at the direction of the president" and was meant to deter future attacks. Trump asserted that Soleimani had been planning further attacks on American diplomats and military personnel and had approved the attack on the American embassy in Baghdad.

According to Saudi-based Arab News, the drone that struck Soleimani's convoy had been launched from Al Udeid Air Base in Qatar, and was controlled remotely by operators at the Creech Air Force Base. A statement by the Air Force of Iran's Islamic Revolution Guards Corps (IRGC) stated that Ali Al Salem Air Base in Kuwait participated, among other bases in the region, in the operation that was executed near Baghdad airport recently. Kuwait summoned the Iranian ambassador to Kuwait over the statement and expressed Kuwait's resentment and categorical denial at such statement.

=== Casualties ===
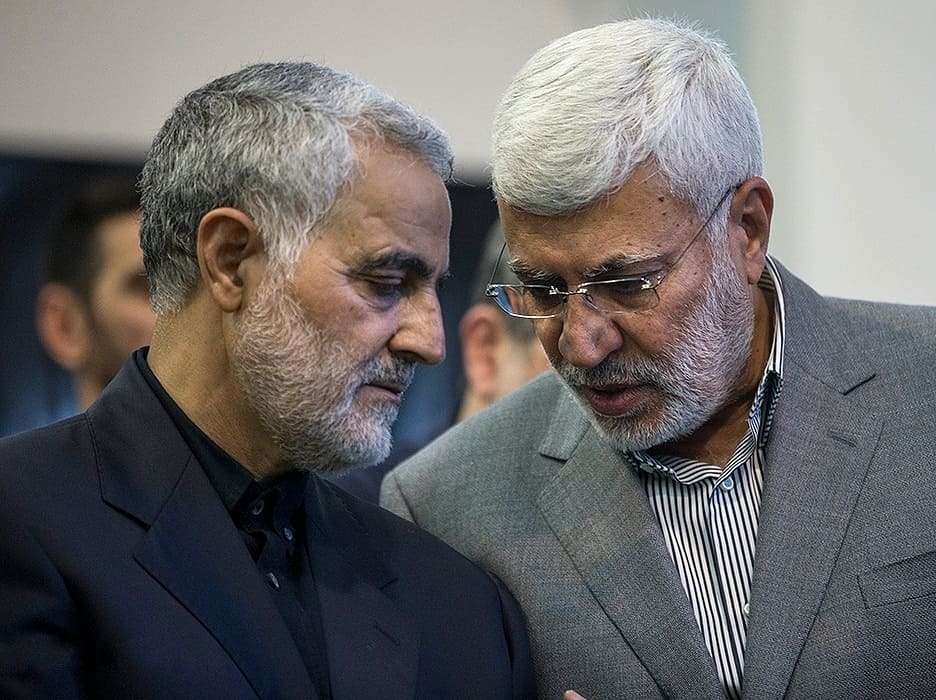
General Qasem Soleimani (left) and Abu Mahdi al-Muhandis were among those killed.

As DNA results were still pending regarding the identification of those killed, a senior Pentagon official said there was "high probability" that Soleimani would be identified. Soleimani's body was identified by a ring that he was known to wear. (Note: U.S. Special Operations forces (SOF) were about 0.5 miles (800 m) behind Soleimani's convoy when it was targeted. However, SOF were on the scene within few minutes and performed a bomb damage assessment, where they dragged Soleimani's body out, and took pictures of it along with his belongings, including his damaged cellphone which made further investigations impossible.) Ahmed Al Asadi, a spokesman for the Popular Mobilization Forces (PMF), confirmed the deaths of Soleimani and Muhandis. According to Ayatollah Ali Sistani's office, the casualties included "several commanders who defeated Islamic State terrorists".

The IRGC said a total of ten people were killed. Along with Soleimani, four other IRGC officers were also killed: Brigadier General Hossein Pourjafari, Colonel Shahroud Mozafarinia, Major Hadi Taremi and Captain Vahid Zamanian. The remaining five casualties were Iraqi members of the PMF: deputy chairman Abu Mahdi al-Muhandis, chief of protocol and public relations Muhammed Reza al-Jaberi, Mohammad al-Shibani, Hassan Abdul Hadi and Heydar Ali.

=== Contemporaneous assassination attempt ===
On the same day of the Baghdad airport strike, an IRGC financier and key commander, Abdulreza Shahlai, (Note: The United States Department of State's Rewards for Justice Program offers up to 15 million USD in rewards for financial background information about the Islamic Revolutionary Guard Corps and its branches, including information related to Abdul Reza Shahlai.) was unsuccessfully targeted by U.S. drones in Yemen, which killed Mohammad Mirza, a Quds Force operative, instead. Shahlai was also responsible for the killing of five American soldiers in Karbala, Iraq on 20 January 2007. According to a Washington Post investigation, the unsuccessful operation might indicate a broader operation than previously explained, raising questions about whether the mission was designed to cripple the leadership of the IRGC or solely to prevent an imminent attack on Americans as originally stated.

== Aftermath ==
Soleimani and al-Muhandis' deaths raised tensions between the U.S. and Iran. As stated by France 24, the targeted killing of Qasem Soleimani "caused alarm around the world, amid fears that Iranian retaliation against American interests in the region could spiral into a far larger conflict".

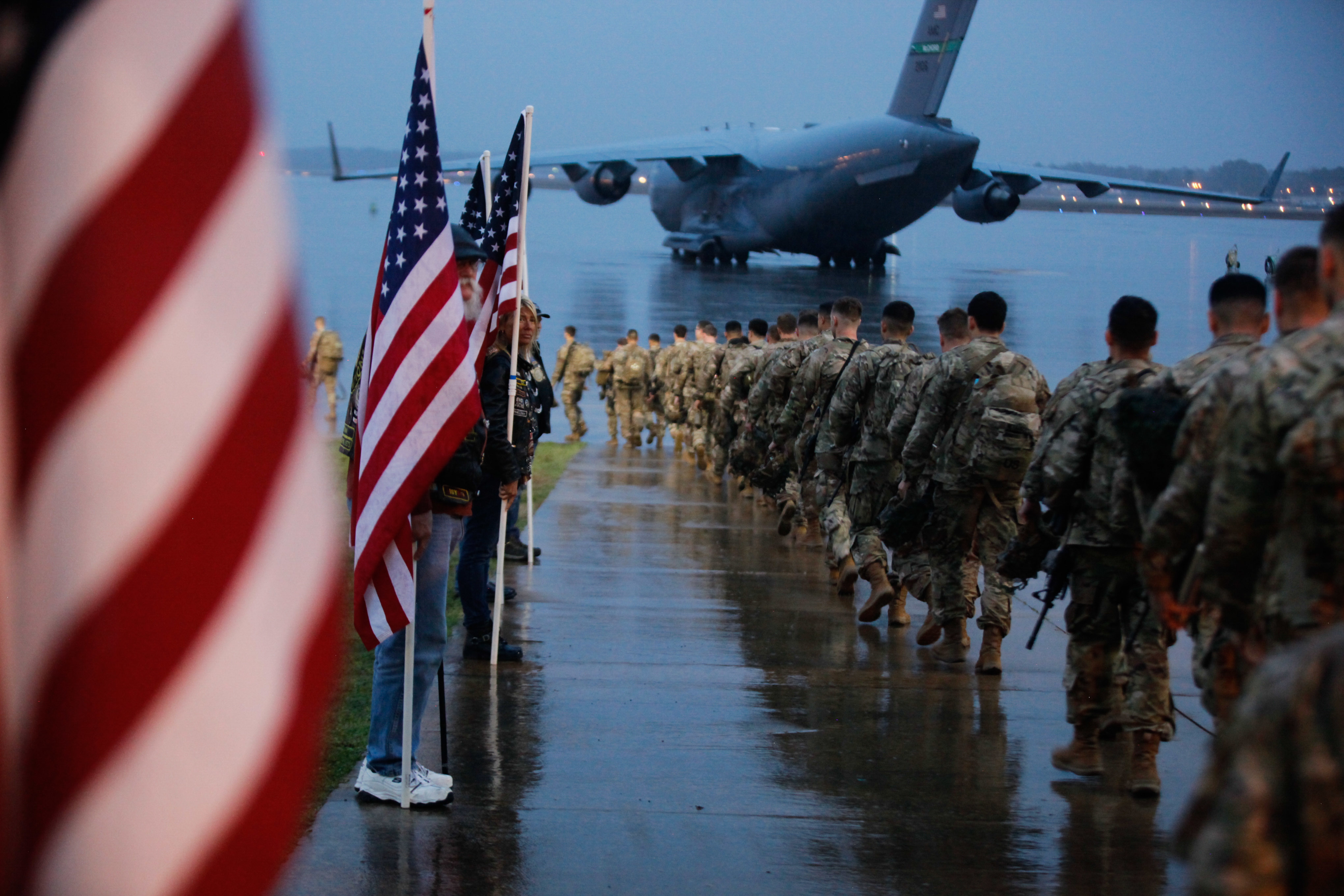
U.S. paratroopers assigned to 1st Brigade Combat Team, 82nd Airborne Division's Immediate Response Force deploying to the Middle East following the Baghdad airstrike, 4 January 2020

Shortly after the attack, several planes with U.S. service members took off from bases in the eastern United States. The following day, the U.S. Department of Defense announced the deployment of 3,500 members of the 82nd Airborne Division to the region, one of the largest rapid deployments in decades. Defense officials said the deployment was not directly related to the airstrike which killed Soleimani, but was instead a "precautionary action in response to increased threat levels against U.S. personnel and facilities".

On 5 January, the UK announced that the Royal Navy will accompany UK-flagged ships through the Strait of Hormuz.

According to some media reports, a Royal Navy nuclear-powered submarine armed with Tomahawk missiles was allegedly ready to strike Iran if tensions escalated in the Middle East.

=== Alleged Taji road airstrike ===
The day after the Baghdad airport attack, Iraqi state news reported that there had been another airstrike on a convoy of medical units of the Iraqi Popular Mobilization Forces near Camp Taji in Taji, north of Baghdad. An Iraqi Army source told Reuters the attack killed six people and critically wounded three. The PMF later said there was no senior commander in the convoy, and the Imam Ali Brigades denied reports of the death of its leader. The PMF also denied that any medical convoy was targeted at Taji. There was no information about who conducted the attack. Spokesman for Operation Inherent Resolve Colonel Myles B. Caggins III said the coalition did not do it, while Iraq's Joint Operations Command denied reports of any such attack occurring, saying it was simply a false rumor that spread quickly due to the prior airport strike.

=== Iranian response ===
Demonstrations in Iran over the death of Soleimani, January 2020

A spokesman for the Iranian government said the country's top security body would hold an extraordinary meeting shortly to discuss the "criminal act of attack". Iran's Supreme Leader Ali Khamenei warned that "retaliation is waiting". On 4 January, the U.S. Department of Homeland Security said there was "no specific, credible" threat to the U.S. mainland but warned about Iranian capabilities. Trump warned Tehran that any retaliation would result in the U.S. targeting 52 Iranian significant sites, including cultural sites. The 52 sites were reported to represent the 52 American hostages held during the Iran hostage crisis. Hossein Dehghan, the main military adviser of Iran, and Iranian Foreign Minister Javad Zarif asserted that attacks on Iranian cultural sites would be grave breaches of international law. U.S. secretary of state Mike Pompeo avoided a direct answer when asked about cultural targets, saying that Washington will do the things that are right and the things that are consistent with U.S. law. U.S. secretary of defense Mark Esper later asserted that cultural sites would not be targeted because "That's the laws of armed conflict."

On 5 January 2020, the Islamic Consultative Assembly of Iran chanted "America, the greatest Satan", during its session. That day, Iran announced that it would suspend all its commitments under the 2015 nuclear deal except that it would continue to cooperate with the United Nations' nuclear watchdog, the International Atomic Energy Agency. The statement added, "If the sanctions are lifted ... the Islamic Republic is ready to return to its obligations."

In a speech broadcast on 8 January on Iranian television IRINN TV, Iranian President Rouhani stated that Iran would no longer stick to the 2015 nuclear agreement restrictions on uranium enrichment: "Iran's nuclear industry will prosper," he said. Secondly, Rouhani mentioned in his speech that "They cut off the hand of our dear Soleimani" and as revenge they, the Iranians, would cut off the legs of the Americans and toss them out of neighboring countries.

==== Funeral ====
Footage of Soleimani's funeral procession in Tehran

The remains of Soleimani and the Iranian figures killed in the strike arrived in Iran on 5 January, where they became part of mourning processions in several cities, first in Ahvaz and later in Mashhad, where one million people attended the mourning. It was initially reported that Iran canceled the mourning procession planned in Tehran because the city would not be able to handle the number of attendees expected after the turnout in Mashhad; however, the Tehran service was held, at which Ayatollah Ali Khamenei publicly wept while leading prayers for the funeral. Iranian state media said the crowd of mourners numbered in the "millions", reportedly the biggest since the 1989 funeral of the founder of the Islamic Republic, Ayatollah Ruhollah Khomeini. Iranian authorities planned to take Soleimani's body to Qom on 6 January for public mourning processions, then onto his hometown of Kerman for final burial on 7 January. Before the national procession was completed, multiple infrastructure works, such as the international airport at Ahvaz and an expressway in Tehran, had already been renamed after him. The funeral was boycotted by critics of the current government by using the hashtag #IraniansDetestSoleimani for the IRGC's war crimes. The hashtag was amplified by "inauthentic" accounts almost immediately after creation.

On 7 January 2020, at least 56 people were killed and 213 injured in a stampede during Soleimani's burial at Kerman. As a result, the burial was postponed to a later time.

==== IRGC retaliatory strike ====
U.S. drone footage of the Al Asad Airbase missile barrage

Shortly after the confirmation of Soleimani's death, U.S. spy agencies reportedly detected that Iran's ballistic missile regiments were at a heightened readiness but it was unclear at the time if they were defensive, cautionary measures or an indication of a future attack on U.S. forces.

On 8 January 2020, Iranian forces launched ballistic missiles at the Al Asad Airbase and an airbase near Erbil, both in Iraq, where American personnel were located. The Islamic Revolutionary Guard Corps declared that the strikes were part of their retaliation for the killing of Soleimani. No Iraqi or American casualties were initially reported.

According to the Iranian Students News Agency (ISNA), the country's state-run news outlet, Iran fired "tens of ground-to-ground missiles" at the base and claimed responsibility for the attacks. The attacks unfolded in two waves, about an hour apart. The Pentagon said these bases were on high alert after signs of the Iranian government were planning attacks on U.S. forces. Although the Pentagon disputes the number launched, it has confirmed that both the Ayn al-Asad and the Erbil airbases were hit by Iranian missiles. A military spokesman for U.S. Central Command said a total of 15 missiles were fired. Ten hit the Ayn al-Asad airbase, one hit the Erbil base, and four missiles failed. Other sources confirmed that two ballistic missiles targeted Erbil: one hit Erbil International Airport and did not explode, the other landed about 20 miles (32 km) west of Erbil. On 8 January Saudi Arabia's Deputy Defense Minister Prince Khalid bin Salman said the Kingdom would stand with Iraq and do everything in its power to spare it from the "danger of war and conflict between external parties". The same day a Ukrainian passenger jet was shot down by the Iranian military over Tehran after presumably being mistaken for an enemy cruise missile. All 176 people on board were killed, including 82 Iranians and others with dual citizenship.

Following a series of conflicting and confusing reports, the Pentagon confirmed that several dozen servicemen had been injured to varying degrees of severity, by the Iranian missile strikes.

==== Oil prices ====
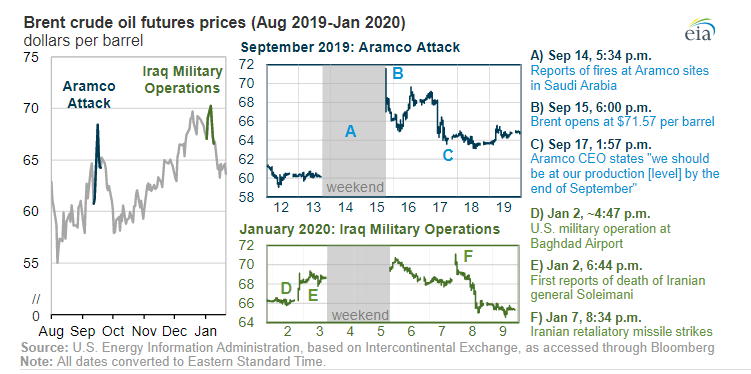
Impact of the attack, and Iranian retaliation, on Brent crude oil prices (bottom right, green)

Global oil prices rose moderately in reaction to Soleimani's death to heights not seen for three months, before falling back down. Following Iran's zero-fatality missile attack, prices were lower than before the airstrike that killed al-Muhandis.

==== Jerusalem Post hack ====
On 2 January 2022, the second anniversary of Soleimani's assassination, The Jerusalem Post's website was hacked, displaying an illustration threatening Israel's Shimon Peres Negev Nuclear Research Center. The image featured a ballistic missile shooting out of a red ring worn on a finger, an apparent reference to the notable ring worn by Soleimani. The Twitter accounts of the Jerusalem Post and Maariv were also targeted. It was unclear if the hack was state sponsored or was conducted by pro-Iranian sympathizers.

==== 2024 Kerman bombing ====
On 3 January 2024, at an event commemorating his death four years after it happened, a bomb exploded in the Iranian city of Kerman killing 103 people. Iranian State Media blames "terrorists" as the perpetrators of the bombing, although they have not provided specifications as to who. Iranian president Ebrahim Raisi condemned the attacks and vowed to bring those responsible for the "heinous act" to justice.

=== Iraqi response ===
In the wake of the Baghdad strike, the U.S. embassy in Baghdad urged Americans to leave Iraq immediately "via airline while possible, and failing that, to other countries via land". The next day, Britain warned its nationals to avoid all travel to Iraq outside the Kurdistan region, and to avoid all but essential travel to Iran. Australia issued a similar warning advising its nationals to "leave Iraq as soon as possible".

On 4 January, the funeral procession for Soleimani, al-Muhandis, and the other Iraqis and Iranians was held in Baghdad and attended by thousands of mourners who chanted "death to America, death to Israel". Iraqi Prime Minister Adil Abdul-Mahdi was also present. The cortege began around Al-Kadhimiya Mosque, a Shiite holy site in Baghdad, before heading to the Green Zone government and diplomatic compound where a state funeral was held. From Baghdad, the procession moved to the Shia holy city of Karbala and on to Najaf, where al-Muhandis and the other Iraqis were buried, while the coffins of Soleimani and the Iranian nationals were sent to Iran. Following the mourning procession in Baghdad, unknown people fired short-range rockets towards the U.S. embassy and at the U.S. Balad Air Base. The U.S. Central Command, which oversees operations in the Middle East, said no Americans were harmed by the sporadic rocket attacks on 4 January.

On 6 January, Chevron evacuated all its American oil workers from Iraqi Kurdistan as a "precautionary measure".

==== Status of U.S. troops in Iraq ====
170 Iraqi lawmakers signed a draft law requiring the government to request the withdrawal of U.S. troops from Iraq. Rudaw Media Network (Kurdish) described the 170 Iraqi lawmakers that signed the law as Shiite and that "Iraqi parliament's resolution to expel foreign troops has no legal consequences." Al Jazeera reported the resolution read "The government commits to revoke its request for assistance from the international coalition fighting Islamic State due to the end of military operations in Iraq and the achievement of victory" and "The Iraqi government must work to end the presence of any foreign troops on Iraqi soil and prohibit them from using its land, airspace or water for any reason." The resolution was approved in the Iraqi parliament. In response to the vote, Trump threatened Iraq with sanctions that would "make Iranian sanctions look somewhat tame" and demanded reimbursement for American investments on military facilities in Iraq.

On 6 January 2020, the Pentagon released a letter from Marine Brigadier General William Seely to Abdul Amir, the Iraqi deputy director of Combined Joint Operations Baghdad, informing him that "as requested by the Iraqi Parliament and the Prime Minister, CJTF–OIR will be repositioning forces over the course of the coming days and weeks to prepare for onward movement." Shortly afterward, Chairman of the Joint Chiefs of Staff Mark Milley said, "That letter is a draft. It was a mistake, it was unsigned, it should not have been released ... [it was] poorly worded, implies withdrawal, that is not what's happening."

A couple of days later, United States Department of State warned Iraq that it could lose access to its Federal Reserve Bank of New York accounts, (Note: In 2015, the U.S. Federal Reserve and Treasury Department halted Iraq's access to its funds at the New York Fed accounts for several weeks, fearing that they would be eventually taken by Iranian banks as well as ISIS. However, Iraq's oil revenues deposited at the Fed were valued at $3 billion every month at the end of 2018, according to The Wall Street Journal. Meanwhile, Iraqi officials declared that around $35 billion of the country's oil revenues are held at the U.S. Federal Reserve, which are equal to 90% of the national budget.) in a phone call if U.S. troops were asked to leave, according to Iraqi officials. (Note: In the meantime, U.S. President Donald Trump mentioned that Iraq should pay back for the facilities built there, if the U.S. military leaves, as their money held in the U.S., otherwise the troops would stay in Iraq. Moreover, the Trump administration drafted sanctions against Iraq whether they expel U.S. troops.)

In mid February, the Iraqi government confirmed to NATO, that they could restart its training missions, which have been paused since the attack. Troops from CJTF–OIR are expected to be moved and work under the NATO banner instead.

==== Impact on Iraqi protests ====
The sustained massive street protests in Iraq that led to Abdul-Mahdi's resignation as prime minister (and temporary caretaker role) restarted in the days after the assassination of Soleimani and al-Muhandis, with a shift in the focus of protests from mostly anti-Iran to criticism of both the U.S. and Iran. The "Made in Iraq" street and online protests strengthened in Baghdad following the assassination. Major protests took place on 5 January 2020 in many cities, "Made in Iraq" protests on 7 January, and two thousand protested in Basra and Nassiriyah on 10 January, with one of the slogans being "Neither America nor Iran, our revolution is a young revolution."

On 24 January, several hundred thousand Iraqis protested against U.S. military presence in Iraq and called for them to leave the country after Shia cleric Muqtada al-Sadr called for a "Million Man March." Iraqi President Barham Salih tweeted, "Iraqis insist on a state with complete sovereignty that will not be breached."

On 31 December 2021, hundreds of Iraqis rallied ahead of the second anniversary of the US assassination of Qassem Soleimani, burning a model of the US embassy in Iraq. Demonstrators gathered outside Baghdad’s Green Zone – which includes the sprawling US Embassy compound calling for the expulsion of American forces still in Iraq.

==== Anniversary protests ====
On 3 January 2021, the one year anniversary of the killings of Soleimani and Abu Mahdi al-Muhandis, thousands of Iraqis demanded American forces pull out of the country in protests in Liberation Square, Baghdad. The anniversary of their deaths in Baghdad was also marked in Iran and by supporters in Syria, Lebanon, Yemen and elsewhere in the Middle East.

== Legality ==
The airstrike's legal justification became a subject of debate. In 2022, Iranian President Ebrahim Raisi declared that unless Trump and Pompeo are brought to trial in an Iranian Islamic Court, revenge will be sought.

=== Potential violation of international law ===
In January 2020, after the U.S. killed Soleimani, US Ambassador to the United Nations Kelly Craft wrote a letter to the UN Security Council in which she said that the act was one of self-defense. At the same time, she wrote in the letter that the US stood "ready to engage without preconditions in serious negotiations with Iran, with the goal of preventing further endangerment of international peace and security or escalation by the Iranian regime."

The Charter of the United Nations generally prohibits the use of force against other states, if a country does not consent to it on its territory. The Government of Iraq did not grant permission to the U.S. to target a military commander from another country on its soil. Some legal experts believe a lack of consent from Iraq makes it difficult for the U.S. to justify the attack.

Agnès Callamard, the United Nations special rapporteur on extrajudicial, summary or arbitrary executions, issued an opinion that the airstrike "most likely violate[d] international law incl[uding] human rights law", adding that killing of other individuals alongside Soleimani was "absolutely unlawful". On 6 July 2020, Callamard said that the attack was the first known incident in which a nation invoked self-defence as a justification for an attack against a state actor in the territory of a third country and that the United States has failed to provide sufficient evidence of an ongoing or imminent attack against its interests in order to justify the strike. In a report to be presented to the UN human rights council, Callamard wrote "the course of action taken by the US was unlawful" and was a violation of the UN charter.

U.S. officials denied the claim. On 8 July 2020, responding, the U.S. State Department said "This tendentious and tedious report undermines human rights by giving a pass to terrorists and it proves once again why America was right to leave the council." UK Defence Secretary Ben Wallace said: "the intelligence information I have seen, under the right to defend yourself against an imminent threat, that would have been met."

Mary Ellen O'Connell, a professor of law at the University of Notre Dame Law School, argued that the "premeditated killing" of Soleimani was against the Hague (1907) and Geneva (1949) conventions, and thus unlawful. Robert M. Chesney, a professor at the University of Texas School of Law, maintained that the attack could have been justifiable if it was "self-defense"; Oona A. Hathaway, professor of international and area studies at the Jackson Institute for Global Affairs, said the available facts did not support that.

A spokesman for Boris Johnson, prime minister of the United Kingdom, said, "States have a right to take action such as this in self-defence." Johnson later said "... the strict issue of legality is not for the UK to determine since it was not our operation", in response to Leader of the Opposition Jeremy Corbyn who called it an "illegal act" and asked for the government to condemn it.

NBC News correspondents reported that according to five current and former Trump administration officials, Trump had authorized the killing of Soleimani back in June 2019 on the condition that "Iran's aggression resulted in the death of an American." According to the correspondents, given the overall timeline of events, this report may call into question for some the Trump administration's citied reason of "imminent threats" as a cause of the killing.

Iran said it will pursue a war-crimes case against U.S. president Donald Trump at the International Criminal Court in the Hague. On 29 June 2020, Iran issued an arrest warrant against U.S. President Donald Trump and asked Interpol for help: Tehran prosecutor Ali Alqasimehr accused Trump and 30 others of "murder and terrorism charges" for the killing of Qasem Soleimani. The request was rejected, however, as Interpol constitution forbids it to undertake "any intervention or activities of a political, military, religious or racial character". On 5 January 2021, Iran asked for another Interpol notice against Trump and 47 others for their roles in the killing; it was rejected on the same grounds.

On 7 January 2021, Iraq's judiciary issued an arrest warrant against Trump, accusing him of "premeditated murder", due to his role in the deaths of Qasem Soleimani and Abu Mahdi al-Muhandis.

=== In terms of agreement with Iraq ===
PMF is legally incorporated into the Iraqi security forces by a series of laws enacted by the parliament and Prime Ministerial orders, therefore, technically, the U.S. killed a senior Iraqi official (Abu Mahdi al-Muhandis) and other military personnel of Iraq.

A mutual agreement signed in 2008 prohibits the U.S. from launching attacks on other countries from Iraqi territory. Iraqi Prime Minister Adil Abdul-Mahdi said the attack was a "breach of the conditions for the presence of U.S. forces in Iraq". He also said "The assassination of an Iraqi military commander who holds an official position is considered aggression on Iraq ... and the liquidation of leading Iraqi figures or those from a brotherly country on Iraqi soil is a massive breach of sovereignty." He and Speaker of the Council of Representatives Mohamed al-Halbousi released separate written statements, both calling the attack a breach of Iraq's sovereignty. According to the office of the Iraqi caretaker prime minister, the U.S. secretary of state has subsequently been requested to send a delegation to Iraq tasked with formulating the mechanism for the withdrawal of U.S. troops from Iraq.

=== Potential violation of U.S. law ===
Some U.S. analysts noted that since the airstrike was orchestrated without the specific authorization of Congress, there were a number of legal questions. The case was compared by AP reporter John Daniszewski to the drone killing of U.S. citizen Anwar al-Awlaki during the Obama administration. One analyst maintained that Trump had the authority to order the strike under Article Two of the United States Constitution.

Executive Order 11905, signed in 1976, to prevent assassination attempts on Fidel Castro, states that "no person employed by or acting on behalf of the United States Government shall engage in, or conspire to engage in, political assassination." According to Vicki Divoll, a former attorney for the Central Intelligence Agency who served as general counsel of the Senate Select Committee on Intelligence, as president, Trump was not legally bound to follow the Executive Orders of prior administrations banning political assassinations, the targeted killing of Solemani was a breach of domestic criminal law. Divoll argued that amendments to Title 18 of the United States Code, specifically Article 51, § 1116, passed by Congress in the 1970s in response to the Munich Olympic Massacre, stating in part: "whoever kills or attempts to kill a foreign official, official guest, or internationally protected person shall be punished as provided under sections 1111, 1112, and 1113 of this title", applied to the airstrike and rendered Trump's actions an unambiguous act of murder under the federal criminal code.

The Trump administration said it was authorized under both the Constitution and the 2002 Authorization of Use of Military Force Against Iraq. The Chairman of the House Committee on Foreign Affairs Eliot Engel said "The 2002 authorization was passed to deal with Saddam Hussein. This law had nothing to do with Iran or Iranian government officials in Iraq. To suggest that 18 years later this authorization could justify killing an Iranian official stretches the law far beyond anything Congress ever intended."

==== Congressional war powers resolution ====
Some members of Congress, which generally was not consulted or briefed before the Soleimani strike, sought to restrict the president's ability to conduct future military operations against Iran without congressional consent. On 6 January 2020, House Speaker Pelosi announced plans to hold a vote within the week on limiting President Trump's war powers concerning Iran. On 8 January 2020, Pelosi announced that a vote will be held by the entire House on 9 January to limit President Trump's war powers concerning any future escalation of conflict with Iran. The House Rules Committee cleared the way for a full House vote by approving parameters which set up a two-hour debate on 9 January. The House vote is considered significant, as the U.S. Constitution provides that while the president may use the military to defend the country, any declaration of war must be approved by Congress (note that Congress has never declared war on anyone since World War II). Trump criticized the effort, arguing that congressional approval should not be needed to militarily engage Iran "because you have to be able to make split-second decisions sometimes". The resolution was later defeated by presidential veto after clearing the senate.

== Reactions ==
President Trump announces the death of Qasem Soleimani, Mar-a-Lago, on 3 January 2020.

NATO Secretary General Jens Stoltenberg remarks

The Iranian government reacted to Soleimani's assassination with martyrdom culture and idolization such as by memorializing him through the likes of murals, billboards, and monuments. Iranian Supreme Leader Ali Khamenei vowed to take "harsh revenge" against the United States and declared three days of mourning. President Hassan Rouhani also said Iran "will take revenge." Foreign Minister Mohammad Javad Zarif called the attack "an extremely dangerous and foolish escalation." Iran sent a letter to the United Nations, calling it "[s]tate terrorism" and said it violated principles of international law. On 7 January, Iran's parliament approved a €200 million increase in the Quds Force's budget, to be used in two months. Reuters reported that some Iranians, including Soleimani supporters, fear that a war could break out at a time of economic hardship and widespread corruption. Some older Iranians recalled memories of the Iran–Iraq War.

In Iraq, outgoing Prime Minister Adil Abdul-Mahdi condemned the attack, calling it an assassination, an act of aggression and a breach of Iraqi sovereignty that could lead to war in Iraq. Subsequently, he declared three days of national mourning. Abdul-Mahdi also said the strike violated the agreement on the presence of U.S. forces in Iraq and legislation should provide safeguards for Iraq's security and sovereignty. The speaker of Iraq's parliament, Mohammed al Halbousi, vowed to "put an end to U.S. presence" in Iraq. The Iraqi parliament voted to ask the U.S. to withdraw their forces from Iraq. Muqtada al-Sadr, leader of the Sadrist Movement and the Saraya al-Salam militia, ordered his followers to "prepare to defend Iraq." Despite the government opposing the airstrike, many Iraqis who are against the PMF celebrated the killing of Soleimani.

On 4 January, Trump tweeted that 52 Iranian targets (representing the 52 American hostages in the 1979–81 Iran hostage crisis) had been selected if Iran "strikes any Americans, or American assets." Iranian President Rouhani responded to Trump's warning, saying "(t)hose who refer to the number 52 should also remember the number 290," referring to the death of 290 people in 1988 when a U.S. warship shot down Iran Air Flight 655. Among those targets were Iranian "cultural sites", and Trump subsequently insisted he would not hesitate to destroy such targets even after some said it could be considered a war crime.

After the assassination, terrorist groups such as ISIS celebrated and said that it "benefitted them."

U.S. Senate Majority Leader Mitch McConnell voiced support for the airstrike, referring to Soleimani as "Iran's master terrorist." House Speaker Nancy Pelosi referred to the attacks as "provocative and disproportionate." She introduced a "war powers resolution" to require Trump's administration to end any hostilities with Iran within 30 days if not approved by Congress. "The present authorizations for use of military force in no way cover starting a possible new war," Senator Richard Blumenthal (D-Conn.) said. "This step could bring the most consequential military confrontation in decades." The Democratic candidates for the 2020 U.S. presidential election largely condemned the airstrike, with Senator Elizabeth Warren (D-Mass.) describing it as a "wag-the-dog" incident.

American foreign policy critic Noam Chomsky called the assassination "an extraordinarily dangerous act," saying it was "as if Iran had decided to murder Mike Pompeo and a major general along with him at the Mexico City International Airport."

United Nations Secretary-General António Guterres expressed concern over the escalation and called for leaders to "exercise maximum restraint." NATO Secretary General Jens Stoltenberg said, following a meeting on 6 January, "(w)e are united in condemning Iran's support of a variety of different terrorist groups" and that "Iran must refrain from further violence and provocations."

Senior officials of the U.S. Department of State compared the assassination to Operation Vengeance in World War II, when American pilots shot down the plane carrying Japanese Admiral Isoroku Yamamoto—a comparison also offered by The New York Times, who said killing Yamamoto was "the last time the United States killed a major military leader in a foreign country". Other major media and prominent pundits echoed the comparison.

According to the Russian Ministry of Defense, "Russia has offered Iraq their S-400 air defense system to protect their airspace." For only the second time since the start of the country's civil war nearly nine years before, the Russian president, Vladimir Putin, arrived in Syria to meet with its president, Bashar al-Assad, on 7 January. In another meeting, in Baghdad, on 6 January, Zhang Tao, the Chinese ambassador, told Iraq's caretaker Prime Minister al-Mahdi that "China is keen to increase security and military cooperation in Iraq."

An Associated Press poll found that only 41% of Americans supported the killing of Soleimani. An USA Today–Ipsos poll, found that 55% of Americans said they believe that the U.S. is less safe because of the killing of Soleimani.

In 2023, an AFC Champions League match was cancelled after the Saudi Al-Ittihad Club refused to play due to the presence of busts of Soleimani in the Iranian stadium.

== Retaliation attempts by Iran ==
Since the death of Soleimani, US authorities have uncovered several plots by Iran to assassinate officials who served in the first Trump administration, including Trump himself, as well as to hack Trump's 2024 presidential campaign. (Note: The two attempted assassinations of Donald Trump in July and September of 2024 were unrelated to Iran.) In October 2024, the Biden administration warned Iran that the US would consider any attempts on Trump's life an act of war. The same month, Fox News reported that Iran intended to continue efforts to target Trump and other former U.S. officials, regardless of the outcome of the 2024 presidential election. The report said that Iran favored Vice President Kamala Harris and sought to prevent Trump's re-election.

In January 2025, days before the Trump's second inauguration, Iranian President Masoud Pezeshkian told NBC News that Iran never tried to assassinate Trump and never would. He blamed Israel for the reports and cited "Iranophobia" as the motivation for their dissemination. After the start of his second term, Trump left instructions to his staff to "obliterate" Iran in the event of a successful assassination.

In June 2025, The Washington Post, citing intelligence sources, reported that Iranian operatives came close to assassinating former US Secretary of State Mike Pompeo during his 2022 visit to Paris, France. According to the report, the operation was part of a broader Iranian campaign to target former senior US officials involved in the killing of Soleimani. While the plot ultimately failed, sources revealed that Iranian agents had come close to executing the plan on European soil.

In December 2025, the FBI warned that Iran’s efforts to retaliate for the death of Soleimani remain active. Testifying before the House Homeland Security Committee, FBI Operations Director Michael Glasheen said Iran continues to plot attacks against former U.S. officials, support proxy groups such as Hezbollah, and conduct surveillance of Jewish and Israeli targets in the United States. Glasheen also reported that the FBI has made more than 70 arrests linked to hostile foreign intelligence activity since Trump took office in January 2025 and has disrupted several alleged Iranian-linked plots. He added that the ongoing Gaza war, as well as the Twelve-Day War and subsequent 2025 United States strikes on Iranian nuclear sites, could increase Iranian activity, including cyber operations, which he described as a major and persistent threat to U.S. interests.

=== Assassination attempt on Ambassador Lana Marks ===
In September 2020, Politico reported that anonymous U.S. intelligence sources claimed that Iran was planning an assassination attempt on the US Ambassador to South Africa Lana Marks in South Africa. The threat, which U.S. officials have monitored since spring, has become more specific recently and allegedly involves Iran’s embassy in Pretoria. If executed, the plot could significantly escalate tensions between the U.S. and Iran, putting pressure on Trump to respond, especially during an upcoming election season.

The U.S. intelligence community's "Duty to Warn" directive mandates that spy agencies inform potential victims of credible threats to their lives. Recently, Ambassador Marks, a longtime friend of Trump, was informed of a potential threat from Iranian operatives. The CIA included this intelligence in its classified World Intelligence Review, which senior U.S. officials and some lawmakers can access. Although Marks has limited known connections to Iran, her association with Trump might make her a target. Iran has an established clandestine network in South Africa for more than a decade, where Marks might be more vulnerable than American diplomats in the West due to weaker local security collaborations.

In response to the plot, President Trump issued a warning to Iran on Twitter, stating that any attack by Iran in any form on the U.S. or its interests "will be met with a response 1,000 times greater in magnitude." The following morning, he reiterated this stance during an interview on Fox & Friends, asserting that his administration was "prepared" to confront any retaliatory actions from Iran.

=== Assassination plot by Shahram Poursafi ===
In August 2022, the U.S. Department of Justice charged an Iranian operative Shahram Poursafi with "plotting to assassinate former President Donald Trump's national security advisor John Bolton." Poursafi, a member of Iran’s Islamic Revolutionary Guard Corps, was charged for "providing and attempting to provide material support to a transnational murder plot". According to reports, Mike Pompeo was also a target, where a bounty of $1 million was placed for his murder.

In response to the plot, Bolton was granted a protective detail from the United States Secret Service on the orders of President Joe Biden. This protection was later rescinded by President Trump upon his return to office on January 20, 2025.

In September 2024, the US Department of State offered a $20 million reward for information leading to the arrest of Poursafi.

=== Assassination plot by Majid Dastjani Farahani ===
On March 5, 2024, the Federal Bureau of Investigation through its Miami, Florida field office issued a public alert on a 41-year-old Iranian national and intelligence agent Majid Dastjani Farahani who was thought to be orchestrating assassination plots against U.S. officials, including former Secretary of State Mike Pompeo.

According to the FBI, Farahani is accused of recruiting individuals for various operations inside the United States, which includes lethal targeting of current and former United States Government officials as revenge for the killing of Soleimani. The report said Farahani frequently travels between Iran and Venezuela and speaks English, Spanish, and French in addition to Persian.

Farahani was already sanctioned by the Office of Foreign Assets Control of the United States Department of the Treasury in December 2023 for human rights abuses and for having acted or purported to act for or on behalf of, directly or indirectly of the Iranian Ministry of Intelligence. The Treasury Department accuses Farahani of recruiting individuals to surveil religious institutions, businesses, and other facilities in the United States as part of Iran's efforts to carry out acts of transnational repression, including rendition and lethal plots against activists, journalists, and foreign government officials.

=== Assassination plot by Asif Merchant ===
On July 16, 2024, in the aftermath of the attempted assassination of Donald Trump, the United States Secret Service revealed details about an Iranian plot to assassinate Donald Trump. Adrienne Watson, a spokesperson for the U.S. National Security Council, said that the plot was believed to be in revenge for the assassination of Qasem Soleimani.

An Iranian foreign ministry spokesperson called the allegations "malicious" and "unsubstantiated". The acting Iranian minister of foreign affairs rejected the claim and said it wanted a "legal path to bring [Trump] to justice" for ordering the assassination of Soleimani. It pointed out that from the perspective of the Islamic Republic of Iran, "Trump is a criminal who must be prosecuted and punished in a court of law for ordering the assassination of General Soleimani."

Three weeks later, on August 6, 2024, it was revealed that a Pakistani man with connections to Iran, Asif Merchant, tried to recruit people for the assignment, with one turning into an informant for the FBI. Merchant was arrested in Houston, Texas on July 12, just before attempting to leave the United States.

Donald Trump Jr. called the plot "the greatest political endorsement ever", saying that "when people like Iran want to take you out, that probably means it's good for America, bad for Iran."

During a visit to the United States in 2024, Israeli Prime Minister Benjamin Netanyahu raised concerns about Iran while addressing a joint session of Congress, warning of the threats posed to both Israel and the United States, including the recent assassination attempt on Trump by Iran. In response, Trump published a post alongside a video clip on his social media platform, Truth Social, invoking the possibility of his assassination and calling for the annihilation of Iran in such an event. "If they do 'assassinate President Trump,' which is always a possibility, I hope that America obliterates Iran, wipes it off the face of the Earth. If that does not happen, American Leaders will be considered 'gutless' cowards!" he wrote, echoing rhetoric reminiscent of his most incendiary statements on Iran.

On March 6, 2026, Merchant was convicted in New York City of murder for hire in the plot to kill Trump. Merchant testified that he participated unwillingly to protect his family in Tehran, whereas the Iranian government denied involvement.

=== Hacking of Donald Trump's 2024 presidential campaign ===
On August 10, 2024, Politico revealed that it had been receiving internal Trump campaign documents from an anonymous source since July 22, including a 271-page vetting report on vice presidential candidate JD Vance's potential vulnerabilities. The Trump campaign confirmed that it had been hacked and blamed "foreign sources hostile to the United States"; it suggested that Iran was responsible, citing a Microsoft report the previous day that an Islamic Revolutionary Guard Corps intelligence unit was responsible for a spear phishing attack on a former senior official with a presidential campaign.

The Washington Post and The New York Times also reported having received the hacked materials. Although the Trump campaign became aware of the hack earlier in the summer, it did not report the hack to law enforcement at the time. The account that sent the documents to the news organizations identified itself as "Robert" and communicated with them via email. Robert claimed to have access to a "variety of documents, from [Trump's] legal and court documents to internal campaign discussions".

On September 27, 2024, the United States Department of Justice unsealed an indictment accusing Iranian officials of stealing emails from 2024 Donald Trump presidential campaign. The indictment listed revenge for the assassination of Qasem Soleimani as the motivation for the hacking.

=== Assassination plot by Farhad Shakeri ===
On November 8, 2024, the U.S. Department of Justice charged three men in connection with alleged Iran-linked murder-for-hire plots targeting high-profile U.S. citizens in a criminal complaint unsealed in New York. The suspects in the case are Farhad Shakeri, Carlisle Rivera, and Jonathan Loadholt. The FBI accuses Shakeri, an Afghan citizen of being an “asset” of Iran’s Islamic Revolutionary Guard Corps (IRGC) and is believed to be based in Tehran. Shakeri, who immigrated to the US as a child was deported in 2008 after spending 14 years in prison for a robbery conviction. The IRGC allegedly tasked Shakeri with orchestrating assassination plots as revenge for the killing of Soleimani. The intended targets included president-elect Donald Trump, an Iranian-American activist, and two Jewish-Americans residing in New York City. Rivera and Loadholt, who met Shakeri during their time in prison, were recruited to assist in these plans and have since been arrested, while Shakeri remains at large.

According to reports, the IRGC prioritized the assassination of Trump, instructing Shakeri to focus exclusively on this mission. Surveillance efforts and detailed planning were part of the scheme, with Shakeri allegedly telling an undercover FBI agent that an IRGC official urged him to "set aside other efforts" to focus on Trump, assuring him that "they have already spent a lot of money, so the money's not an issue." The same official reportedly indicated the plot might be halted until after the election, believing his assassination could be easier afterward since Trump would lose the election. Additionally, Shakeri was instructed to monitor and plan attacks on two Jewish-Americans in New York and Israeli tourists in Sri Lanka, with a promised payment of $500,000 for each successful operation.

The activist, believed to be journalist Masih Alinejad, publicly acknowledged the assassination plot against her and expressed her astonishment. In a post on X, she revealed that she was one of the intended targets, stating: "I am shocked. I just learned from the FBI that two men were arrested yesterday in a new plot to kill me at Fairfield University, where I was scheduled to give a talk."

Shortly after the charges were announced, Attorney General Merrick Garland stated: "Few actors in the world pose as grave a threat to the national security of the United States as Iran. The Justice Department has charged an operative of the Iranian regime, who was directed to coordinate a network of criminal associates to advance Iran's assassination plots against its targets, including President-elect Donald J. Trump."

In a separate statement, U.S. Attorney Damian Williams emphasized the ongoing threats posed by individuals acting on behalf of the Iranian government. He stated, "Actors directed by the Government of Iran continue to target our citizens, including President-elect Trump, both on U.S. soil and abroad. This must stop." Williams further asserted, "Today's charges send another clear message to those engaged in such efforts: we will remain steadfast in pursuing bad actors, regardless of their location, and will stop at nothing to bring to justice those who endanger our safety and security."

Following the revelation of the plot, Newsweek reported that the U.S. Secret Service had deployed a remote-controlled robotic dog to safeguard the president-elect at his Mar-a-Lago residence in Palm Beach, Florida. The agency confirmed to Newsweek that the robotic dogs were part of their security assets. “Safeguarding the President-elect is a top priority,” stated Anthony Guglielmi, the U.S. Secret Service's Chief of Communications. “While we cannot disclose specific capabilities, these robotic dogs are equipped with advanced surveillance technology and an array of sensors that enhance our protective operations.”

== In popular culture ==
- In the 2022 video game Call of Duty: Modern Warfare II, the player is tasked with killing a fictional Iranian general named Ghorbrani using a cruise missile. Many news outlets noted that this mission appears to be heavily inspired by the assassination of Qasem Soleimani. The fictional character also visually resembles Soleimani.
- Some opponents of the Islamic Republic of Iran use the term "cutlet" to describe the assassination of Qassem Soleimani and to protest against the regime of the Islamic Republic of Iran. Nawab Ebrahimi, a cooking teacher, was arrested by the security agencies of the Islamic Republic on January 3, 2023 for spreading the recipe for cooking cutlets on Instagram. According to some social media users, including Ali Karimi, the cutlet has become the "red line" of the Islamic Republic.

== See also ==
- Assassination of Ali Khamenei
- List of assassinations by the United States
- Countering America's Adversaries Through Sanctions Act
- Disposition Matrix
- Timeline of United States military operations
- 2020 in Iran
- 2020 in Iraq
- USA kill or capture strategy in Iraq
- Kerman bombings
- Assassination of Ismail Haniyeh
- Assassination of Hassan Nasrallah
- June 2025 United States strikes on Iran
- 2026 United States strikes in Venezuela
