= Elizabeth Tsurkov =

Russian and Israeli researcher (born 1986)

- אליזבט צורקוב (Hebrew); Елизавета Цуркова (Russian)
- Born: 11 November 1986 (age 39); Leningrad, Russian SFSR, Soviet Union
- Citizenship: Russian; Israeli
- Education: Hebrew University (BA); Tel Aviv University (MA); University of Chicago (MA)
- Scientific career
- Fields: Comparative politics
- Workplaces: Princeton University

Elizabeth Tsurkov (Hebrew: אליזבט צורקוב, romanized: Elizabet Tzurkov, Russian: Елизавета Аркадьевна Цуркова, romanized: Yelizaveta Arkadyevna Tsurkova; born 11 November 1986) is a Russian and Israeli researcher who was kidnapped in Baghdad in March 2023 while conducting doctoral research in Iraq. She was held hostage by the group Kata'ib Hezbollah for 903 days before her release in September 2025. She is currently a doctoral student at Princeton University.

== Biography ==
Tsurkov was born on 11 November 1986 in Leningrad (now Saint Petersburg), Russian SFSR, Soviet Union to Jewish parents who immigrated to Israel when Tsurkov was four.

During her mandatory service in the IDF, Tsurkov became interested in the Arab world. In 2011, she began learning Levantine Arabic, after finishing her bachelor's degree in international studies from the Hebrew University of Jerusalem. She later received master's degrees in Middle Eastern studies and political science, respectively, from Tel Aviv University and the University of Chicago.

Tsurkov was affiliated with several human rights organizations promoting the rights of Palestinians and refugees. In 2014, Tsurkov volunteered at the NGO Hotline for Refugees and Migrants. According to a report in Ynet, she also worked as Natan Sharansky's assistant. According to Sharansky, Tsurkov had volunteered at the human rights organisation Gisha for over ten years. She was also active with the Regional Thinking Forum and a nonresident fellow at the New Lines Institute for Strategy and Policy, an American foreign policy think tank.

Tsurkov has written about the Middle East, and particularly the Syrian civil war, for publications such as +972 Magazine, The Forward, Haaretz, The New York Times, and The Washington Post.

Tsurkov has regularly travelled to Iraq since 2019, using her Russian passport and entering through Kurdistan Region. At the time of her kidnapping, she was visiting Iraq to conduct field research in Iraq for her doctoral dissertation at the Department of Politics of Princeton University.

== Kidnapping and release ==
US members of Congress expressing their "alarm over the continuing detention of Elizabeth Tsurkov" and urging US president Joe Biden to "continue pursuing negotiations for her release"

Tsurkov entered Iraq with her Russian passport in January 2023. Multiple Princeton scholars and employees, including Professors Amaney Jamal, Tali Mendelberg and Mark Beissinger, were aware of her research in Baghdad. Her last communications with Princeton was on 19 March 2023.

Tsurkov contacted Shia cleric Ahmed Alwani with the intention of meeting his cousin Muhammad Alwani, a senior official in the Kata'ib Hezbollah in Iraq. Shafaq News reported that when the two men discovered Tsurkov's Israeli citizenship, Muhammad Alwani decided to have her kidnapped, although Tsurkov says her kidnappers did not know about her citizenship until a month after and believes she was more likely taken for ransom. Tsurkov was abducted on 21 March 2023, while sitting in a cafe in Baghdad's Karrada district.

=== Response ===
Shortly after her disappearance, an Iraqi news website said that Iraqi authorities were questioning an Iranian citizen in connection to the kidnapping.

In early July 2023, Israeli prime minister Benjamin Netanyahu confirmed Tsurkov had been abducted, and accused Kata'ib Hezbollah of abducting her, which they denied. The Iraqi government made a statement that they were investigating Tsurkov's disappearance, but so far had no answers.

On 8 September 2023, human rights organizations Amnesty International, Democracy for the Arab World Now, Human Rights Watch, and Scholars at Risk urged the Iraqi government "take steps to ensure the immediate and unconditional release of Elizabeth Tsurkov," citing the International Convention for the Protection of All Persons from Enforced Disappearance. On 11 September, American senators Bob Menendez and Cory Booker wrote a letter asking American President Joe Biden to put pressure on the Iraqi government for Tsurkov's release. On 13 September a Princeton spokesperson said the university "...continues to communicate with relevant government officials and experts to understand how we can best support Elizabeth’s safe return to her family and her studies at Princeton".

On 13 November 2023, a 4-minute video of Tsurkov was released on Telegram and subsequently aired by Alrabiaa TV. In the video, which could not be authenticated, Tsurkov says she had been detained for seven months, although she does not identify her captors or location, and she also mentions the Gaza war. Tsurkov also says in the video that she had been working for the CIA and Mossad, which Tsurkov's family denied. Several Iraqi experts determined it was a forced confession made under duress, making it invalid and unreliable.

In late January 2025, Iraqi foreign minister Fuad Hussein confirmed to Israeli journalist Barak Ravid that Tsurkov was still alive and that efforts were underway to secure her release. Tsurkov's family expressed doubt about the Iraqi government's efforts.

=== Treatment during captivity ===
Tsurkov said in a November 2025 interview with The New York Times that she was tortured and sexually abused by Kata'ib Hezbollah during her captivity. The Times reviewed her medical records and said they described extensive injuries originating in torture. Tsurkov said that she decided to share her experience to "give a voice to the Iraqis who have been tortured by [Kata'ib Hezbollah]". In a later interview to the BBC, published on 2 December 2025, Tsurkov repeated the facts that during her time in captivity, she suffered from starvation and interrogations. Once her captors found out she was an Israeli they began torturing her using electrocutions, beatings, whippings, sexual abuse and being hung from the ceiling by her hands. She described a particular method used in Iraq "It's called 'the scorpion'. You get handcuffed with [your] shoulders crossed behind the back. It often leads to dislocation of shoulders."

In January 2026, Tsurkov wrote a piece for The Atlantic about on how her captors were poor interrogators and prone to confirmation bias.

=== Release ===
On 9 September 2025, Iraqi prime minister Mohammed Shia al-Sudani and U.S. president Donald Trump announced, on Twitter and Truth Social respectively, that Tsurkov had been freed. She was freed after 903 days in captivity, and was transferred to the U.S. Embassy in Baghdad following her release. Israeli sources reported that she would return to Israel.

According to Agence France-Presse, citing a Kata'ib Hezbollah source, Tsurkov's release was negotiated under the condition that U.S. military forces withdraw from Iraq. US Special Presidential Envoy for Hostage Affairs, Adam Boehler, who led the efforts to secure Tsurkov's release, however, indicated that "the United States did not give anything in return for Tsurkov’s release". The Arabic international newspaper Asharq Al-Awsat reported, based on sources in the Iraqi militia and security circles, that the abductors were effectively forced into releasing Tsurkov "after a political siege and negotiations that escalated since August, under pressure from the Iraqi government and the United States," so that Kata'ib Hezbollah "lost their bargaining chip and got nothing". Lebanese and Saudi media claimed that Tsurkov's release was in fact a prisoner swap, and that Iraqi militia members were released and that talks would be held to release Hezbollah operative Imad Amhaz who was captured in Lebanon by Israeli commandos in November 2024, in addition to five other detainees. According to a US State Department spokesperson, the release of Elizabeth Tsurkov "came after a decisive partnership with [Iraqi] Prime Minister Mohammed Shia al-Sudani". According to The Times of Israel, parts of her release process relied on Qatar.

=== Post-release ===
On 1 December 2025, Tsurkov criticized the Israeli government's policy towards post-Assad Syria as "rudderless". On 15 April 2026, the United States put a bounty on Ahmad al-Hamidawi and Kataeb Hezbollah, the group responsible for Tsurkov's kidnapping.
