= Dhuluiya =

Dhuluʿiya Arabic: الضلوعية
- Town
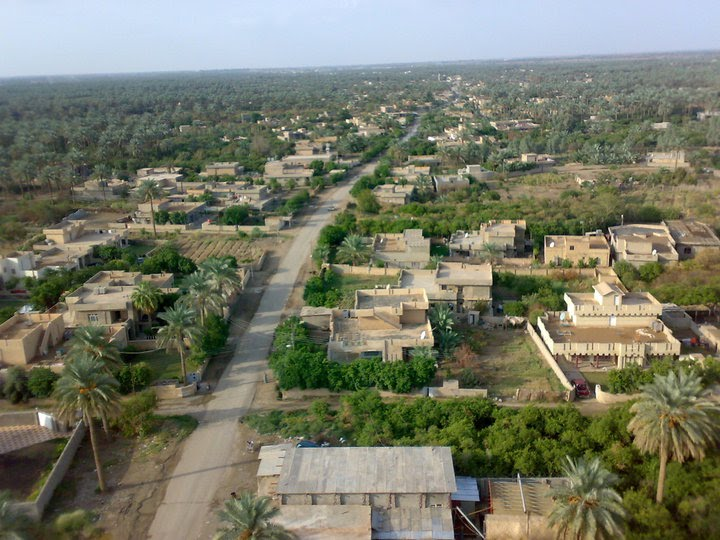
- Aerial photo of the town

- Location in Iraq
- Coordinates: 34°3′N 44°12′E
- Country: Iraq
- Governorate: Salah ad-Din
- District: Balad

Population (2014)
  - Total: 17,000

Dhuluʿiya (Arabic: الضلوعية, romanized: aḍ-Ḍulūʿīyah) is a town in Salah ad-Din Governorate, Iraq situated on the left bank of the Tigris, near the mouth of the ʿAdhaim, some 20 miles (32 km) east of Samarra and 47 miles (76 km) north of Baghdad. The population is predominantly Sunni Arab of the Khazraj and Jubur tribes.

== History ==
Sa'ad Al-Izzi of The New York Times reported in 2003 that many people in the town, forming part of the Sunni Triangle, had a negative attitude towards the American military occupation and a positive reception towards Saddam Hussein, opposing the U.S. invasion of Iraq. Sectarian violence between Sunnis and Shias occurred in 2004–2007. However, in 2009 Al-Izzi stated that the town was peaceful when he visited.

The town was partially taken by the Islamic State of Iraq and the Levant during their June 2014 offensive. In December 2014, it was retaken by an alliance of local tribal fighters, the Iraqi army, and the Popular Mobilization Units in the Dhuluiya offensive.
