= Kata'ib Hezbollah =

Shia Islamist paramilitary group in Iraq

- Hezbollah Battalions logo based on Hezbollah and IRGC logos
- Leaders: Mojtaba Khamenei (Supreme Leader of Iran)
- Military leader: Abu Mahdi al-Muhandis X (2003–2020); Ahmad al-Hamidawi (2020–present)
- Spokesperson: Jafar al-Hussaini
- Dates active: October 2003 – present
- Country: Iraq (de jure); Own Territory (de facto)
- Allegiance: Iran (IRGC)
- Group: Saraya al-Dafa al-Shaabi
- Headquarters: Baghdad, Iraq
- Active regions: Baghdad; Southern Iraq; Western Iraq
- Ideology: Shia Islamism; Khomeinism; Velayat-e Faqih; Anti-Americanism; Anti-Zionism; Anti-West
- Status: Active
- Size: 2,000 (2010; at most); 10,000 (June 2014); Over 30,000 (December 2014 claim)
- Part of: Popular Mobilization Forces; Islamic Resistance in Iraq; Axis of Resistance
- Wars: Iraq War; Iraqi insurgency (2003–2011); 2003–2006 phase of the Iraqi insurgency; Iraqi civil war (2006–2008); War in Iraq (2013–2017); Salahuddin campaign; Siege of Amirli; Liberation of Jurf Al Sakhar; Dhuluiya offensive; Battle of Baiji (2014–2015); Second Battle of Tikrit; Syrian civil war; Siege of al-Fu'ah and Kafriya; Aleppo offensive (October–December 2015); Northern Aleppo offensive (February 2016); Palmyra offensive (March 2016); Syrian Desert campaign (May–July 2017); 2017 Abu Kamal offensive; Rif Dimashq offensive (February–April 2018); Iraqi insurgency (2017–present); Attacks on U.S. bases in Iraq, Jordan, and Syria (2023–present); 2025–2026 Iranian protests

Kata'ib Hezbollah (KH; Arabic: كتائب حزب الله, lit. 'Battalions of the Party of God'), also known as the Hezbollah Brigades, is an Iraqi Shia paramilitary group under the command of Iran's Islamic Revolutionary Guard Corps and a nominal component of the Iraqi Popular Mobilization Forces (PMF), staffing the 45th, 46th, and 47th Brigades. It is considered the most powerful militia in Iraq. Despite KH being a formal part of Iraq's security apparatus through its affiliation with the Popular Mobilization Forces, the Iraqi government has since 2020 actively undertaken steps to combat its influence, including by conducting raids against Kata'ib Hezbollah in order to disarm armed groups that refuse to be controlled by the state.

During the Iraq War (2003–2011), the group fought against Coalition forces. It was active in the War in Iraq (2013–2017) and the Syrian civil war, where it fought against the Islamic State of Iraq and Syria (ISIS). The group was commanded by Abu Mahdi al-Muhandis until he was killed in a US drone attack in 2020. Thereafter, Abdul Aziz al-Muhammadawi (Abu Fadak) became the new chief of staff of the PMF.

The group seeks to establish an Iran-aligned government in Iraq, expel American forces from the country, and advance the regional and international interests of Iran in Iraq and the region. The group is responsible for killing hundreds of U.S. soldiers and takes a central part in carrying out attacks against U.S. targets in Iraq and acts as part of the Axis of Resistance. Kata'ib Hezbollah has received extensive training, funding, logistic support, weapons, and intelligence from the Islamic Revolutionary Guard Corps' overseas military-intelligence service Quds Force. Kata'ib Hezbollah (KH) is officially listed as a terrorist organization by the governments of Japan, the United Arab Emirates, and the United States.

== Status ==
According to U.S. researchers Michael Knights, Crispin Smith, and Hamdi Malik, writing for the pro-Israel Washington Institute for Near East Policy, Kataib Hezbollah functions as the “premier militia in Iraq, operating under Iran's direct command”, and is the “strongest individual faction in Iraq's Popular Mobilization Forces (PMF)”, with control over key departments within PMF such as its chief of staff, security, intelligence, missiles, and anti-armor. The Quds Force of the IRGC finances, instructs, directs, and controls KH, as well as provides it with military assistance, intelligence sharing, and selects, supports, and supervises its leadership.

== History ==
=== Formation ===
KH was established in March 2003 as a result of a union of several pro-Iranian groups following the invasion of Iraq by the United States and United Kingdom that overthrew the regime of Saddam Hussein. The conflict continued for much of the next decade as an insurgency emerged to oppose the Coalition forces and the post-invasion Iraqi government. The group was founded by Jamal Jafaar al-Ibrahim, known as Abu Mahdi al-Muhandis, an Iraqi-Iranian dual national designated as a terrorist by US in 2009. Its first members were from the Badr Organization. Al-Muhandis — an adviser to the Quds Force of the IRGC and a former member of the Badr Organization — was the first commander of KH. The group is directly subordinate to the Quds Force and operates under its instructions and guidance. The US State Department has claimed that Lebanon-based Hezbollah provided via Unit 3800 weapons and training for the group.

=== Iraqi insurgency (2003–2011) ===
The group came to prominence in 2007 for attacks against U.S.-led Coalition forces in Iraq, and was known for uploading videos of its attacks on American forces on the internet. The militia's main tactics were to fire rockets and mortar shells at U.S. bases, sniper attacks, and plant roadside bombs to attack U.S. and Coalition forces. On 19 July 2005, U.S. Army Sgt. Arthur R. McGill was killed in Baghdad, when a makeshift bomb planted by Kata'ib Hezbollah exploded while he was on mounted patrol in a Humvee.

On 17 October 2006, four U.S. servicemembers were killed when the Buffalo MRAP they were riding in was struck by an improvised-explosive device west of Baghdad at about 6:50 a.m. The attack was captured on video and posted online by KH. On 27 February 2007, three American soldiers were killed and another was wounded by a roadside bomb planted by KH militants in the Iraqi capital. On 15 March 2007, four U.S. soldiers were killed in eastern Baghdad when IEDs planted by KH detonated near their unit.

On 18 June 2007, U.S. Army Sgt. Eric L. Snell was killed when a KH sniper shot him in the face during a firefight with KH militiamen in Baghdad. On 25 September 2007, Staff Sgt. Zachary B. Tomczak was shot dead by a KH sniper in Baghdad. His killing was captured on video and posted online by the KH militia. On 4 October 2007, U.S. Army Spc. Avealalo Milo was killed by a KH sniper in Baghdad. The attack was recorded and subsequently published online by the militia. On 20 November 2007, Alfred G. Paredez Jr. was killed when Kata'ib Hezbollah cell members detonated an IED in al-Baladiyat neighborhood of Baghdad.

On 4 June 2008, KH conducted a rocket attack that was meant to target Coalition forces but instead killed 18 civilians in Baghdad. In mid-2008, U.S. and Iraqi forces launched a crackdown against the group and the "Special Groups", the US military term for Iran-backed militias in Iraq. At least 30 of its members were captured during those months. Many of the group's leaders were also captured and US officials claimed that "as [a] result much of the leadership fled to Iran". On 2 July 2009, KH was added to the U.S. State Department list of Foreign Terrorist Organizations. The group was held responsible for numerous IED, mortar, rocket and RPG attacks as well as sniper operations, targeting US and Iraqi forces, including a November 2008 rocket attack that killed two U.N. workers.

In December 2009, the group intercepted the unencrypted video feed of MQ-1 Predator UAVs above Iraq. On 12 February 2010, a firefight with suspected members of the group occurred 265 km (165 mi) southeast of Baghdad in a village near the Iranian border, the U.S. military said. Twelve people were arrested, it said. "The joint security team was fired upon by individuals dispersed in multiple residential buildings ... members of the security team returned fire, killing individuals assessed to be enemy combatants," the military said in a statement. The Provincial Iraqi officials said many of the dead were innocent bystanders, and demanded compensation. They said eight people were killed.

On 13 July 2010, General Ray Odierno named KH as being behind threats against American bases in Iraq. "In the last couple weeks there's been an increased threat ... and so we've increased our security on some of our bases," Odierno told reporters at a briefing in Baghdad. On 6 June 2011, KH militants fired rockets at Forward Operating Base Loyalty in eastern Baghdad killing six U.S. soldiers. Another five soldiers were also wounded in the attack. On 29 June 2011, KH fired IRAM rockets that struck a US base near the Iranian border – COP Shocker. The attack resulted in the deaths of three American soldiers. In July 2011, an Iraqi intelligence official estimated the group's size at 1,000 fighters and said the militants were paid between $300 and $500 per month. The Al-Qa'im border crossing has seen hastened military activity as the group is expected to play an important military and security role as the crossing with Syria is officially opened on 30 September 2019.

=== Post-US withdrawal ===
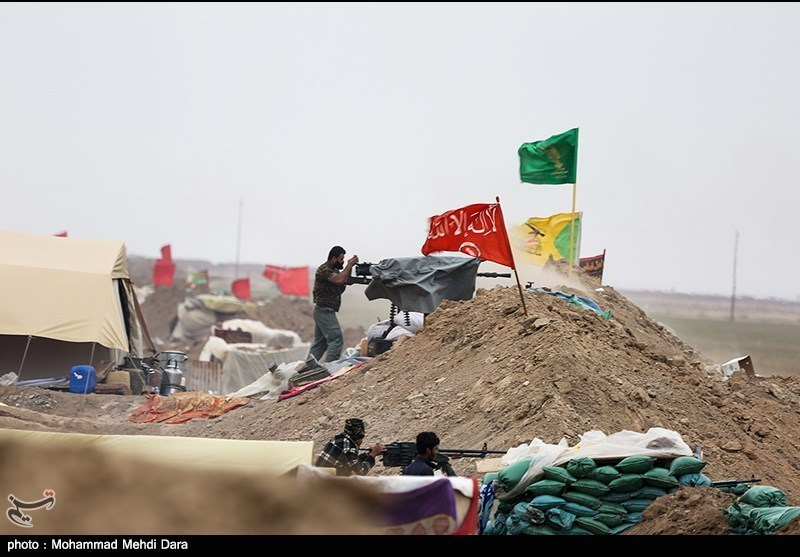
Kata'ib Hezbollah and other Popular Mobilization Forces at the Battle of Tal Afar

Wathiq al-Batat, a former KH leader, announced the creation of a new Shia militia, the Mukhtar Army, on 4 February 2013, saying its aim is to defend Shiites and help the government combat terrorism. In 2014, the group began taking a role in the fight against ISIL in Iraq. Also in 2014, they and six other predominantly Shia Iraqi paramilitary groups formed the PMF. Since October 2016, KH along with the Iraqi army and other PMF groups has taken part in the Battle of Mosul against ISIL. They have been, alongside other PMF, active in fighting around Tal Afar, severing ISIL's link from Mosul and Tal Afar to the rest of their territory.

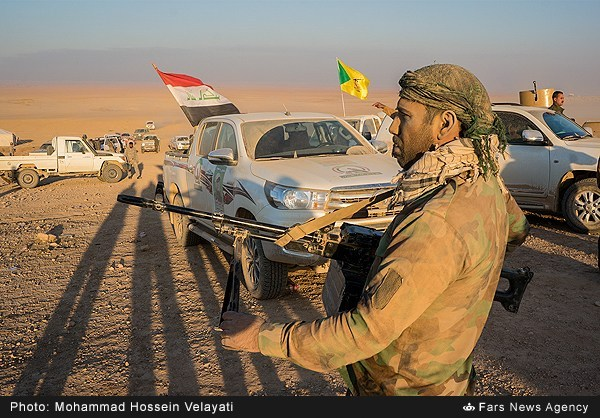
Kata'ib Hezbollah soldiers clearing villages between Tal Afar and Mosul, 2016

During protests in Iraq in 2019, KH militiamen were reportedly involved in abducting and murdering hundreds of peaceful protesters. On 29 December 2019, the United States bombed the headquarters of KH near Al-Qa'im. The airstrikes targeted three KH locations in Iraq and two in Syria, and included weapons depots and command posts, according to Reuters and a US military statement. The attack was in retaliation after a barrage of over 30 rockets were fired towards the K-1 base two days earlier and other attacks on bases with US forces in Iraq. The earlier attack killed a US contractor and wounded several Iraqi and US soldiers. Twenty-five people were reportedly killed in the US airstrikes and 51 members wounded.

In response to the American bombing of the KH headquarters on 29 December, protesters attacked the US embassy in the Green Zone in Baghdad on 31 December 2019. Many of the protesters were members of the KH militia, including KH commander Abu Mahdi al-Muhandis. Secretary of Defense Mark Esper warned on 2 January that the group may be planning new attacks in Iraq, and that the U.S. is prepared to launch preemptive attacks. Abu Mahdi al-Muhandis was assassinated by the United States near Baghdad International Airport on 3 January 2020. On 27 February 2020, the U.S. State and Treasury departments designated Ahmad al-Hamidawi, the secretary-general of KH, as a "Specially Designated Global Terrorist."

In March 2020, U.S. launched air raids against KH facilities in Karbala in retaliation for the Camp Taji attacks. On 25 June 2020, Iraqi security forces raided KH base in Dora, southern Baghdad and detained at least 14 militia members. On 11 October 2020, KH announced that they have agreed to conditional ceasefire against United States interests in Iraq. On 26 February 2021, U.S. air strikes hit targets used by the KH militia and other Iranian-backed groups in Syria. These strikes were carried out in retaliation for an attack on a U.S. air base in Erbil on 15 February 2021.

On 21 March 2023, KH kidnapped Israeli researcher Elizabeth Tsurkov in Baghdad's Karrada district. In November 2023, the group released footage of her for the first time. Tsurkov was released on 9 September 2025. On 17 November 2023, United States expanded the scope of sanctions on KH by blacklisting six high-ranking officials affiliated with the militia following attacks on U.S. forces in Iraq and Syria. On 21 November 2023, a US AC-130-gunship struck a KH vehicle near Abu Ghraib, in response to the Islamic Resistance In Iraq's November 20 attack on Al-Asad Airbase. On 24 January 2024, U.S. launched a round of air strikes that targeted KH, killing seven militiamen. According to a statement from U.S. Central Command, the air strikes hit the group's “headquarters, storage, and training locations for rocket, missile, and one-way attack UAV capabilities.”

A spokesperson for the US Department of Defense has said that the Tower 22 drone attack which killed 3 US soldiers and injured 47 others had the "footprints" of KH. On 30 January 2024, KH announced the suspension of all its military operations against US forces in the region after the Tower 22 drone attack which killed 3 US soldiers and injured 47 others. They announced this decision was taken out of preventing "embarrassment" of the Iraqi government which has called for all resistance parties to de-escalate the situation. On 30 July 2024, U.S. forces carried out an airstrike in central Iraq killing four members of KH militia. Later that year, on 20 September, Kata'ib Hezbollah announced that Abu Haidar al-Khafaji, a senior commander in the group, was killed by an airstrike about 5 kilometres (3.1 mi) away from Sayyidah Zaynab near Damascus, Syria, and blamed Israel for the attack. On 27 July 2025, Kata'ib Hezbollah-linked fighters clashed with Iraqi security forces in al-Saydiya, southwestern Baghdad, killing one police officer and one civilian, according to the Washington Institute. The Iraqi Joint Operations Command later announced the arrest of fourteen people accused of involvement in the clashes and stated that some belonged to the 45th and 46th PMF Brigades, which are known as Kata'ib Hezbollah units.

On 31 March 2026, KH kidnapped American journalist Shelly Kittleson in Baghdad. Kittleson was released on 7 April 2026 in a prisoner exchange.

=== Human Rights Violations ===
KH has been involved in extrajudicial killings, abductions, and forced disappearances of Sunni boys and men. The group kidnapped 1500 Sunni men and boys in Jurf al-Sakhar with other PMF militias, though many have been released, over 643 are still missing, and 50 have been confirmed to have been executed. They have also prevented displaced Sunni residents from returning to their homes and operated secret prisons. During the Tishreen protests in Iraq, KH participated in kidnapping, torture, and killing of protesters who were demonstrating against government corruption and Iranian influence.

The group has threatened and targeted political figures, analysts, and experts who disagree with their Shiite Islam or criticize Iranian influence in Iraq. They were allegedly involved to the 2020 murder of Iraqi scholar Hisham al-Hashimi. In March 2023 KH kidnapped Israeli-Russian Jewish academic Elizabeth Tsurkov and held her captive for over 900 days before her release in September 2025. In captivity she reported sexual abuse and other forms of torture. In Kazakhstan and Uzbekistan, the group tried to attack Jewish communities. They failed a gun attack on the Jewish agency offices in Almaty, Kazakhstan and attempted to burn down a Jewish center in the same city. They are also linked to arson attacks in Tashkent, Uzbekistan.

=== Foreign interventions ===
In 2013, KH and other Iraqi Shia militias acknowledged sending fighters to Syria to fight alongside forces loyal to President Bashar al-Assad, against the Sunni rebels seeking to overthrow him in the Syrian Civil War. On 9 January 2024, the KH spokesperson Jafar al-Husseini warned that the Islamic Resistance in Iraq would help Hezbollah fight Israel if war erupted between the two sides. This statement was a few weeks after the Islamic Resistance in Iraq claimed responsibility for a drone attack on a Karish rig which Lebanon claims to hold sovereignty to. On 7 February 2024, a U.S. drone strike in Baghdad killed three members of KH. Among those killed was Abu Baqir Al-Saadi, while another was tentatively identified as Arkan al-Elayawi. Al–Saadi was the commander of Kataib Hezbollah's operations in Syria.

In April 2024, Abu Ali al-Askari, security chief of Kata'ib Hezbollah based in Iraq, said the organisation was prepared to arm "Islamic Resistance" in Jordan and is ready to provide "12,000 fighters with light and medium weapons, anti-armor launchers, tactical missiles, millions of rounds of ammunition, and tons of explosives" to "defend the Palestinians and avenge the honour of Muslims." On the same day, al-Tanf garrison in Syria was attacked by a one-way attack drone which was intercepted. After the Allenby Bridge shooting in September, Kata'ib Hezbollah congratulated the Islamic Resistance in Jordan for the operation.

On January 26, 2026, in the aftermath of the 2025–2026 Iranian protests and subsequent 2026 Iran massacres and 2026 Internet blackout in Iran, Kata'ib Hezbollah called for its fighters around the world to prepare to fight on behalf of the Iranian regime. In March 2026, KH announced that Abu Ali al-Askari (aka Abu Ali al-Amiri), its security chief and a prominent spokesman, was killed in an airstrike on Baghdad, reportedly carried out by U.S. forces during the 2026 Iran war. KH announced that Abou Moujahed al-Assaf replaces al-Askari as security chief. On 14 March 2026, a KH drone breached the air defenses of the Camp Victory base for the first time and managed to strike it.

=== US sanctions ===
On 15 April 2026, the United States put a bounty on its leader Ahmad al-Hamidawi.

== See also ==
- Al-Etejah TV (channel owned and operated by Kata'ib Hezbollah)
- Belligerents in the Syrian civil war
- Elizabeth Tsurkov
- Executive Order 13224
- Holy Shrine Defender
- List of armed groups in the War in Iraq (2013–2017)
- Saraya al-Khorasani
- United States Department of State list of Foreign Terrorist Organizations
