= Abu Mahdi al-Muhandis =

Iraqi military commander (1954–2020)

- أبو مهدي المهندس
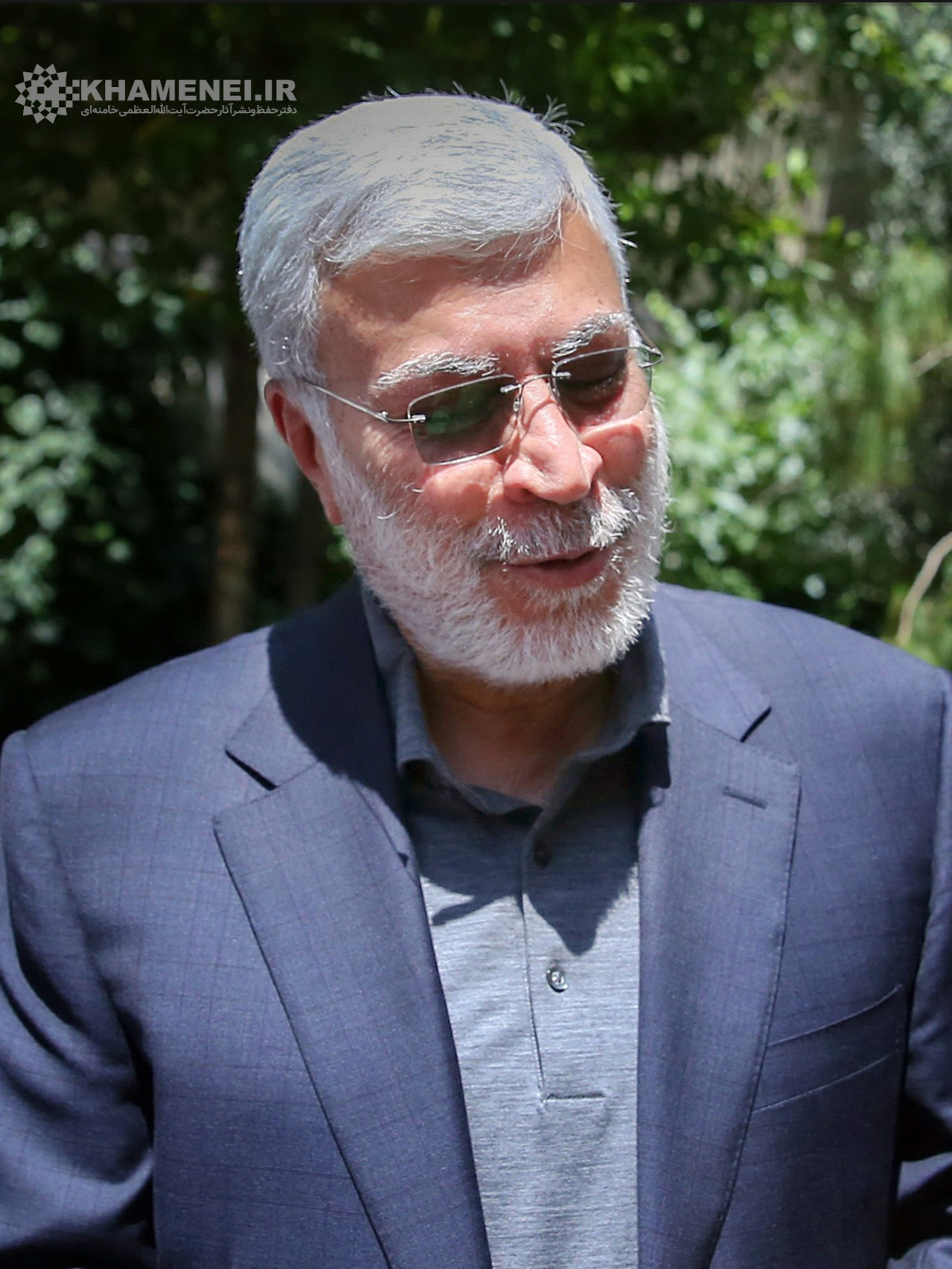

Deputy Chairman of Popular Mobilization Committee
- In office 15 June 2014 – 3 January 2020
- Preceded by: Office established

Secretary-General of Kata'ib Hezbollah
- In office October 2003 – 3 January 2020
- Preceded by: Office established
- Succeeded by: Ahmad al-Hamidawi

Member of Iraqi Parliament
- In office 2006–2007

Personal details
- Born: Jamal Ja'far Muhammad Ali Al Ibrahim; 16 November 1954 Abu Al-Khaseeb, Kingdom of Iraq
- Died: 3 January 2020 (aged 65) Baghdad, Iraq
- Cause of death: Assassination
- Party: Islamic Dawa Party (1977–2020)
- Other political affiliations: Islamic Supreme Council of Iraq (1985–2020)

Military service
- Allegiance: Iran
- Branch: Popular Mobilization Forces
- Service years: 1979–2020
- Rank: Commander
- Unit: Kata'ib Hezbollah; Badr Brigade (formerly)
- Conflicts: Iran–Iraq War; Iraq War; War in Iraq (2013–2017); First Battle of Tikrit; Liberation of Jurf Al Sakhar; Siege of Amirli; Second Battle of Tikrit; Third Battle of Fallujah; Battle of Mosul; Western Nineveh offensive; 2017 Iraqi–Kurdish conflict; 2019–2021 Persian Gulf crisis X

Jamal Ja'far Muhammad Ali Al Ibrahim (Arabic: جمال جعفر محمد علي آل إبراهيم Jamāl Jaʿfar Muḥammad ʿAlīy ʾĀl ʾIbrāhīm, 16 November 1954 – 3 January 2020), better known by his kunya Abu Mahdi al-Muhandis (Arabic: أبو مهدي المهندس, lit. 'Father of Mahdi, the Engineer'), was an Iraqi paramilitary leader and former chief of staff of the Popular Mobilization Forces (PMF). At the time of his death, he was deputy chairman of the PMC.

From 1977, he was an opponent of Saddam Hussein. He became the commander of volunteer militias that grew from the need to combat ISIS, including the Kata'ib Hezbollah paramilitary group, which is designated a terrorist group by the governments of Japan, the United States and the United Arab Emirates; and prior to that worked with the Iranian Revolutionary Guards (IRGC) against Saddam's regime. Muhandis was on the United States list of designated terrorists since 2009.

Allegations of terrorism have been levelled against him over his activities in Kuwait in the 1980s. He was sentenced to death in absentia in 2007 by a court in Kuwait for his involvement in the 1983 Kuwait bombings. The organisations he oversaw, such as the Popular Mobilization Forces, have been reported to have close links to the IRGC's Quds Force. Al-Muhandis was held responsible for planning the attack on the American embassy in Baghdad in late December 2019.

On 3 January 2020, Al-Muhandis was traveling with the head of Iran's expeditionary Quds Force Qasem Soleimani near Baghdad International Airport. Soleimani was the primary target of a targeted U.S. drone strike which killed Al-Muhandis as well.

== Early life and education ==
His birth name was Jamal Ja'far Muhammad Ali Al Ibrahim. He was born on 16 November 1954 in Abu Al-Khaseeb District, Basra Governorate, Iraq, to an Iraqi father and an Iranian mother. His family was said to have migrated to Iraq from Iran decades earlier, and his wife was Iranian. He was fluent in Persian. He was also a dual citizen. He finished his studies in engineering in 1977 and in the same year joined the Iraq-based Shi'te Dawa Party, which opposed the Ba'athist government.

== Military career ==
On 1979, after the activity of the Dawa Party was banned and hundreds of opponents were sentenced to death by Saddam Hussein. Al-Muhandis fled, across the border to Ahvaz in Iran, where the Iranians had set up a camp to train Iraqi dissidents, with the aim of undermining Saddam. He was known as Jamal al-Ibrahimi in Iran and he became a citizen of Iran after a marriage. He began working with Iran's Revolutionary Guard in Kuwait in 1983, organizing attacks on embassies of countries that supported Saddam in the Iran–Iraq War. Hours after the December 1983 bomb attacks on U.S. and French embassies in Kuwait, he fled to Iran. He was later convicted and sentenced to death in absentia by a court in Kuwait for planning the attacks. He was later appointed a military adviser to the Quds Force, advising on attacks against Iraqi military based in his hometown of Basra.

He returned to Iraq following the 2003 U.S.-led invasion of Iraq and served as a security adviser to the first Iraqi prime minister after the invasion, Ibrahim al-Jaafari. In 2005, he was elected to the Iraqi Parliament as a Dawa Party representative for the Babil Governorate. When U.S. officials realised his identity and connection with the 1983 attacks, they raised the issue with then-Iraqi prime minister Nouri al-Maliki in 2006 or 2007. He had to flee to Iran. He formed Kata'ib Hezbollah between 2003 and 2007.

He returned to Iraq following the withdrawal of US troops (December 2011) to head the Kata'ib Hezbollah militia; he then became deputy chief of the Popular Mobilization Forces.

On 31 December 2019, U.S. Secretary of State Mike Pompeo named al-Muhandis, along with Qais Khazali, Hadi al-Amiri, and Falih Alfayyadh, as responsible for the attack on the United States embassy in Baghdad.

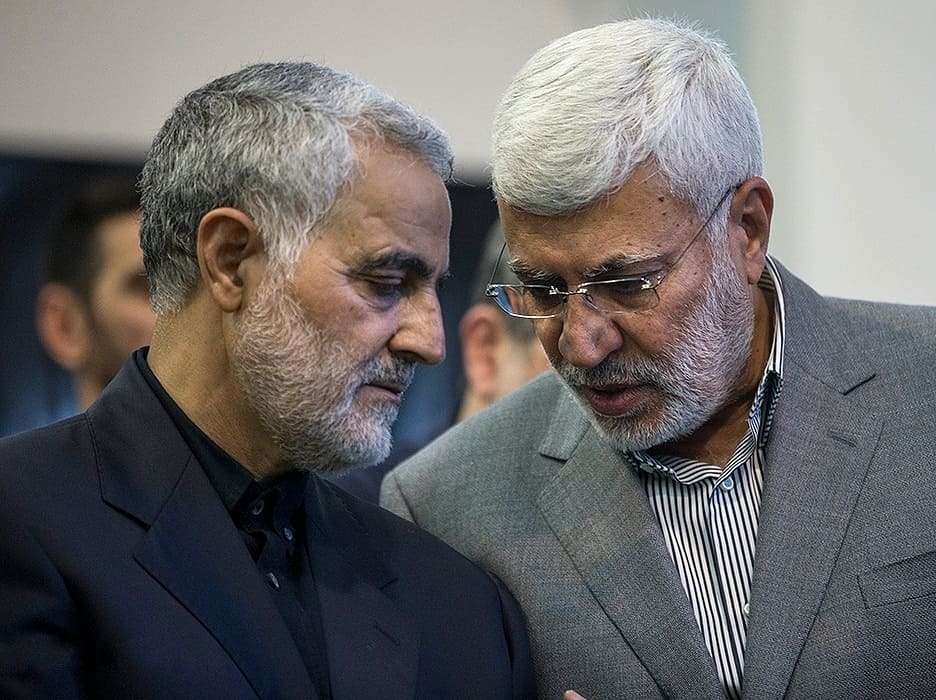
Qasem Soleimani (left) with Abu Mahdi al-Muhandis (right) at a 2017 ceremony commemorating the father of Soleimani in Tehran

=== War against ISIL in Iraq ===
After the formation of the Popular Mobilization Forces (PMF) as a group in 2014 that originated to help Iraq defeat ISIL, he was appointed to command the group. The PMF group was composed of some 40 militias that fought in nearly every major battle against ISIL.

== Sanctions ==
In 2009, al-Muhandis was sanctioned by the United States Department of the Treasury for allegedly helping the IRGC. Muhandis was also accused of being linked to the IJO who participated in 1983 United States embassy bombing in Beirut.

== Death ==
Abu Mahdi was killed on 3 January 2020 around 1:00 a.m. local time (22:00 UTC 2 January), by the U.S. drone strike which targeted Qasem Soleimani and his convoy near Baghdad International Airport. BBC News, NBC News, DW News, Time, The Guardian, Euronews, Al Jazeera and other media outlets have described the killing as an assassination.

=== Reaction ===
Palestinian Islamic Jihad (PIJ) group mentioned him as one of the symbols of Iraqi liberation from the US occupation and also condolences to the Iraqi for the death of Abu Mahdi al-Muhandis.

=== Funeral and burial ===
Funeral of Qasem Soleimani and other casualties

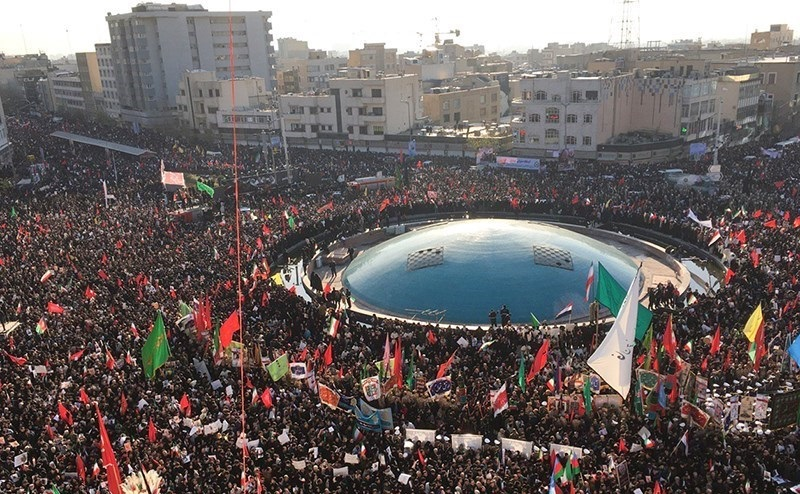
Funeral of Soleimani and other casualties in Enqelab Square, Tehran

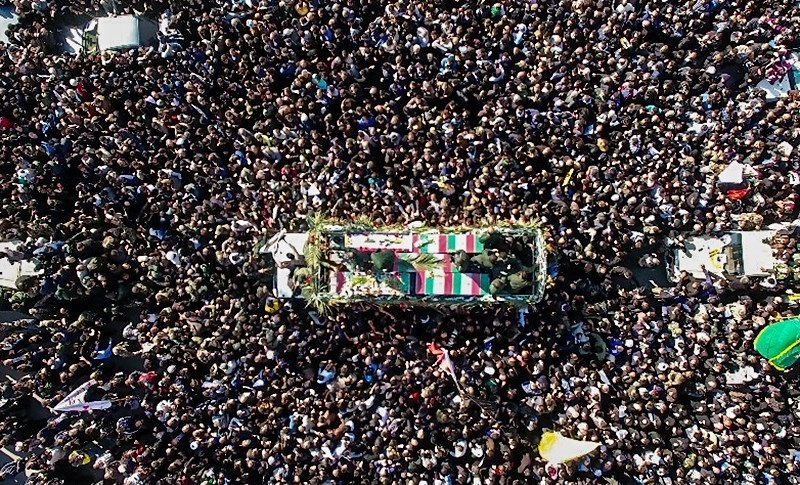
Funeral of Soleimani and other casualties in Ahvaz, Iran

On 4 January, a funeral procession for Abu Mahdi al-Muhandis and Soleimani was held in Baghdad with thousands of mourners in attendance, waving Iraqi and militia flags and chanting "death to America, death to Israel". The procession started at the Al-Kadhimiya Mosque in Baghdad. Iraq's prime minister, Adil Abdul-Mahdi, and leaders of Iran-backed militias attended the funeral procession. They were taken to the holy Shia cities of Najaf and Karbala were held funeral prayers on them.

He was transferred to Iran for the DNA test. A funeral procession was started from Ahvaz then was taken them to Mashhad. On 6 January, Iranian Supreme Leader Ali Khamenei held funeral prayers among hundreds of thousands of people and crying in front of the flag-draped coffins for the deceased. On 7 January, his body was returned to Iraq and transferred to his hometown of Basra. His burial was delayed because of the huge crowd at the funeral. On 8 January, Al-Muhandis was buried in Iraq's Najaf where hundreds of mourners gathered to pay their final respects. Funeral processions were also held in several Iraqi cities prior to Najaf, including Baghdad and Karbala.

=== First anniversary ===
On 3 January 2021, the first anniversary of Qassem Soleimani and Abu Mahdi al-Muhandis' deaths was observed in Baghdad. Tens of thousands of Iraqis marched on the highway leading to the airport while chanting anti-American slogans.

== See also ==
- Abu Mahdi (missile)
- List of assassinations by the United States
- USA kill or capture strategy in Iraq
