= List of Soviet and Russian assassinations =

List of Soviet and Russian assassinations may refer to:

- List of Soviet assassinations
- List of Russian assassinations
