= Abu Baqir Al-Saadi =

Syrian Kata'ib Hezbollah commander

Wissam Muhammed Sabir Al-Saadi (1974 – 7 February 2024), more commonly known as Abu Baqir Al-Saadi, was a high ranking commander of Kata'ib Hezbollah who was in charge of the group's operations in Syria. He was also reportedly the primary planner behind most of the attacks against US bases in Iraq and Syria and was killed in a targeted US drone strike in the Al-Mashtal neighborhood in eastern Baghdad while in a vehicle with two other militants.
