= Hamza al-Jawfi =

Al-Qaeda commander

Hamza al-Jawfi was an Al-Qaeda commander who was killed in Pakistan in June 2010. According to the BBC, al-Jawfi was believed to have operated as Al-Qaeda's external operations chief following the death of Abu Ubaidah al-Masri.
