= Ahmad al-Hamidawi =

Iraqi Shia militiaman

Ahmed Mohsen Faraj Al-Humaidawi (Arabic: أحمد محسن فرج الحميداوي; born 25 March 1974), known as Abu Hussein Al-Humaidawi (أبو حسين الحميداوي), is the Secretary-General and commander of special operations of the Iranian-government-backed Iraqi Kata'ib Hezbollah. The United States government announced on 26 February 2020 that it had designated Al-Humaidawi on the global terrorism list.

== Career ==
The military wing led by Al-Humaidawi seeks to target the interests of the United States of America and supports Shiite militia fighters outside Iraq. Military affairs specialist Michael Knights said, according to informed sources, that Al-Humaidawi was known to be reckless, with unpredictable actions, and focused on avenging the killing of Abu Mahdi al-Muhandis. Ahmed Al-Humaidawi served as a point of contact between Nouri al-Maliki and Russian diplomats, and the newspaper Al-Ain reported on 28 February 2020 that Al-Humaidawi had “a long criminal record.”

The United States designated him on the global terrorism list after the killing of the former commander of Kata'ib Hezbollah, Abu Mahdi al-Muhandis, noting that Al-Humaidawi's designation on the list was not linked to any terrorist attack carried out by him, according to Nathan A. Sales, the Coordinator for Counterterrorism.

On 15 April 2026, the United States put a bounty on Ahmad al-Hamidawi and Kataeb Hezbollah.
