= List of Assassinations by the Gaddafi regime =

As the ruler of Libya, Muammar Gaddafi sponsored several assassinations throughout the 1980s until the end of the regime in 2011, particularly in the "Stray Dogs" campaign targeting Libyan dissidents and exiles. Amnesty International reported that between 1980 and 1987, a total of 25 political opponents were assassinated outside of the country in 37 attacks.

== Assassinations ==
Target	Nationality	Position	Date	City	Country	Perpetrator	Method
Mohamed Salem Rtemi	Libya	Businessman.	21 March 1980	Rome	Italy	Libyan hitmen.	Shot to death.
Mohammed Mustafa Ramadan	Libya	Journalist.	11 April 1980	London	United Kingdom	Libyan hitmen.	Shooting.
Aref Abdul Gelie	Libya	Businessman.	19 April 1980	Rome	Italy	Libyan hitmen.	Shooting.
Abdullatif Muntasser	Libya	Relative of opposition leader Omar Al Muheisi.	21 April 1980	Beirut	Lebanon	Libyan hitmen.	Shot to death.
Mahmud Abu Salem Fafa	Libya	Lawyer	25 April 1980	London	United Kingdom	Libyan hitmen.	Shooting.
Abdallah Mohamed al-Kazmi	Libya	Dissident.	10 May 1980	Rome	Italy	Libyan hitmen.	Shooting.
Omran el Mehdawi	Libya	Former diplomat at the Libyan Embassy in Bonn.	10 May 1980	Bonn	West Germany	Bashir Ehmida.	Shooting.
Mohamed Fouad Buohjar	Libya	Merchant.	20 May 1980	Rome	Italy	Libyan revolutionary committee.	Strangled and stabbed.
Mohammed Lahderi Azzedin	Libya	Businessman.	11 June 1980	Milan	Italy	Libyan hitmen.	Shooting.
Abdul Rahman Abu Bakr el Kimyas	Libya	Junior Libyan army officer.	21 May 1980	Athens	Greece	Libyan hitmen.	Throat slashed.
Ahmed Mustapha Grea'a	Libya	University Student.	29 November 1980	Manchester	United Kingdom	Libyan hitmen.	Stabbed to death.
Umar Muhayshi	Libya	Libyan army officer, member of the Libyan Revolutionary Command Council.	January 1984	Tripoli	Libya	Sa'eed Rashid.	Tortured or beaten to death.
Yvonne Fletcher	United Kingdom	Police officer.	17 April 1984	London	United Kingdom	Gunman in Libyan embassy.	Shooting.
Ahmed Rafiq al-Barrani	Libya	Businessman.	2 April 1985	Nicosia	Cyprus	Libyan hitmen.	Shooting.
Gebril Abdul Raziq al-Dinali	Libya	Former police officer and opposition leader.	6 April 1985	Bonn	West Germany	Fatahi El Tarhoni.	Shooting.
Muhammad Fehaima	Libya	Dissident.	7 January 1987	Athens	Greece	Libyan hitmen.	Shot to death.
Youssef Kherbish	Libya	Member of the National Front for the Salvation of Libya.	26 June 1987	Rome	Italy	Libyan hitmen.	Shooting.
Mansour Rashid Kikhia	Libya	Libyan Minister of Foreign Affairs from 1972–1973, Libyan Ambassador to the United Nations, Permanent Libyan Representative to the United Nations from 1975–1980.	Disappeared 10 December 1993	Cairo	Egypt	Unknown.	Unknown.
Daif al-Ghazal	Libya	Opposition journalist.	21 May 2005	Benghazi	Libya	Suspected members of the Revolutionary Guard.	Torture murder.
Mohammed Nabbous	Libya	Information technologist, blogger, businessperson and civilian journalist.	19 March 2011	Benghazi	Libya	Pro-Gaddafi militia.	Shot with sniper rifle.

== Attempted assassinations ==
Target	Nationality	Position	Date	City	Country	Perpetrator	Method
Umar Muhayshi	Libya	Libyan army officer, member of the Libyan Revolutionary Command Council.	1976	Cairo	Egypt	Cuban exiles contracted by ex-CIA officers Edwin P. Wilson and Frank Terpil.	Unspecified.
Salem Mohammad Fezzani	Libya / Italy	Restaurant owner,	21 May 1980	Rome	Italy	Unidentified gunman.	Shooting.
Mohamed Saad Bekhit	Libya	Unspecified.	11 June 1980	Rome	Italy	Unidentified gunman.	Shooting.
Faisal Zagallai	Libya	Student dissident.	14 October 1980	Fort Collins	United States	Eugene Tafoya.	Shooting.
Karim and Souad Kassuda	Libya	Children of Libyan dissident Farad Kassuda.	11 November 1980	Portsmouth	United Kingdom	Unspecified Libyan man.	Poisoning.
Abdel Hamid Bakkush	Libya	Former Prime Minister of Libya.	November 1984	Cairo	Egypt	Anthony Gill, Godfrey Philip Chiner and two Maltese operatives.	Shooting.
Ezzedin al-Ghadamsi	Libya	Libyan ambassador to Austria.	28 February 1985	Vienna	Austria	Unidentified gunman.	Shooting.
Ezzedin al-Ghadamsi	Libya	Libyan ambassador to Austria.	20 May 1987	Vienna	Austria	Mohammed El-Hak.	Shooting.
Hosni Mubarak	Egypt	President of Egypt.	1989	Addis Ababa	Ethiopia	Unspecified Libyan assassin.	Unspecified.
Abdullah of Saudi Arabia	Saudi Arabia	Crown Prince of Saudia Arabia	2003	Mecca	Saudi Arabia	Abdurahman Alamoudi and Mohamed Ismael.	Shoulder-fired missiles (alleged).
