= Dhuluiya offensive =

2014 military operation in Iraq

- Part of the Iraqi Civil War (2014–2017) and the Salahuddin campaign (2014–15)
Date	28–30 December 2014
Location	Dhuluiya, Balad District, Saladin Governorate, Iraq
Result	Iraqi victory: Iraqi security forces capture Dhuluiya and break the siege of the Juburi tribe
Territorial changes	Dhuluiya and nearby areas recaptured from ISIL

Belligerents
(Iraq) Iraqi Security Forces: Iraqi Army; Iraqi Air Force; Iraqi Police; Shia Militias: Badr Organization; Local Sunni tribesmen: al-Jiburi tribe	Islamic State of Iraq and the Levant: ISIL military

Commanders and leaders
(Iraq) Haider al-Abadi; Karim al-Nuri	Abu Bakr al-Baghdadi

Strength
Unknown	Unknown

Casualties and losses
1 killed	300 fighters killed (Iraqi claim)

The Dhuluiya offensive was launched on 28 December 2014 by Iraqi forces backed by Sunni tribesmen and Shia militiamen on the strategic town of Dhuluiya (Arabic: الضلوعية), which had been held by ISIL for months. On 30 December, the area was recaptured and the ISIL siege on the Sunni al-Juburi tribe was broken.

It was part of a bigger campaign to fully clear the Saladin Governorate.

== Background ==
The town of Dhuluiya (or Dhuluiyah), 50 miles south of Tikrit and 90 kilometres (55 miles) north of Baghdad, is strategically located on roads linking the eastern province of Diyala to Saladin Governorate in the north.

On 14 July 2014, ISIL took control of part of the town. They bombed government buildings, including a court and local council headquarters, and exploded a bridge leading toward the neighboring town of Balad in an effort to prevent the arrival of reinforcements.

The Jubur (or Jabour or Jubouri) tribe, a Sunni tribe in the south of the town, had been resisting ISIL attacks for nearly six months.

In October, Iraqi forces retook most of Dhuluiya, but ISIL later launched a counter-offensive and managed to recapture the ground they had lost.

== Offensive ==
On 26 December, Iraqi forces attacked ISIL positions on several fronts and captured a string of villages south of Dhuluiya. On 28 December, the troops entered from the north backed by the air force, and seized the airport just outside the town.

On 30 December, Iraqi forces completed the recapture of the town of Dhuluiya.

Since 28 December, the anti-ISIL forces have been clearing bombs and other explosives placed by the ISIL fighters in various parts of the town.

The military adviser of the Secretary General of Badr Organization, Abu Hamza al-Amiri was killed by an explosion of a booby-trapped mosque by ISIL terrorists in Dhuluiya.

Retired Brigadier General Abbas Hassan Jabr, who had joined the Badr Organization after the advances of ISIL, was killed on 29 December by a sniper's bullet during fighting ISIS in Dhuluiya. Iraqi Prime Minister Haider al-Abadi issued a statement hailing Jabr as "one of Iraq's heroes" and vowing that his death would increase "our determination to liberate all Iraq".

On 31 December, al-Abadi met with tribal leaders and security forces in al-Dhuluiya district and congratulated them. He said the liberation is "a quantum leap in the war against terrorist gangs and a platform for new victories and does inflict further defeats against ISIS and its collaborators."
