= Sadrist–Khomeinist conflict =

Ideological and armed conflict between Shia Muslims in Iraq

Date	2006–present (Mainly 2008-2023)
Location	Iraq
Result	From 2021 to 2022, Iraq faced a political crisis fueled by deep divisions between Shia nationalists loyal to Muqtada al-Sadr and pro-Iran Shia factions backing the Popular Mobilization Forces. This power struggle created significant instability, as al-Sadr's supporters sought a more independent Iraq while pro-Iran groups aimed to solidify their influence.

Belligerents
Mahdi Army; Promised Day Brigades; Peace Companies	Asa'ib Ahl al-Haq; Badr Organization; Kata'ib Hezbollah; Popular Mobilization Forces; Supported by: Iran; Ba'athist Syria (2006-2024)	Iraq

Casualties and losses
50-75 (2021-2022)	30-80 (2021-2022)	20-70 (2021-2022)

The Sadrist–Khomeinist conflict refer to the rivalry between the Sadrist Movement and Iran-backed Shia militias in Iraq.

== History ==
During their opposition to Saddam Hussein, Iraqi Shia militias were united and had Iranian support. The conflict emerged during the Iraqi civil war, when Iraqi Shia militias disagreed over Iran and its interference in Iraqi affairs. Muqtada al-Sadr was the son of Mohammed al-Sadr, who founded the nationalist Sadrist Movement in the 1980s. After Mohammed al-Sadr was assassinated in 1999, Muqtada al-Sadr succeeded him as the leader of the Sadrist Movement and became one of the most powerful and respected Shia clerics. Following the 2003 invasion of Iraq, Muqtada al-Sadr founded the Mahdi Army, with the goal of expelling American troops from Iraq and establishing an Iraqi Shia government.

Although the Mahdi Army was focused on expelling American troops from Iraq, the political Sadrists joined a coalition with the Islamic Dawa Party and SCIRI. The Sadrists were the kingmakers in the success of the coalition which resulted in the election of Nouri al-Maliki. However, al-Sadr and Maliki were at odds over the topic of Iran, and the disagreements led to the Mahdi Army fighting against the pro-Iran government of Maliki by 2006. Despite its initial popularity as a Shia resistance group, the Mahdi Army provoked a series of clashes in early 2007 which caused even some of its staunchest supporters to criticise it. In August 2007, following violent clashes in Karbala between the Mahdi Army and the Iran-backed Badr Brigades, in which 50 Shia pilgrims were killed, there was much pressure on the Mahdi Army.

The Mahdi Army was accused of provoking the clashes, and al-Sadr ordered his supporters to disarm. However, not all Mahdi Army members followed the order. This was when the Special Groups emerged, which was a term for Mahdi Army members who continued to fight. In 2006, Qais al-Khazali founded Asa'ib Ahl al-Haq (AAH). AAH became a prominent Shia militia in Iraq and was tied with the Quds Force, which gave it the majority of its funding. In late 2007, al-Sadr went into exile in Qom, Iran, where he continued his religious studies while continuing to lead the Mahdi Army. In February 2008, al-Sadr ordered the Mahdi Army to resumed military activities, provoking the 2008 Iraq spring fighting. Following the ceasefire, al-Sadr fully disarmed the Mahdi Army.

The Mahdi Army began to focus on social services for impoverished Shia communities in Iraq. Although the majority of the Mahdi Army was disarmed, al-Sadr retained his elite fighters and formed the Promised Day Brigades. The PDB were prohibited from fighting Iraqi troops, and only focused on American forces until they withdrew in 2011. Despite running in elections against Maliki, Iranian intervention probed al-Sadr to agree to enter a coalition with Maliki. The Sadrist support for Maliki ensured him a second term, and the Sadrists had 8 out of 32 seats in the new government. Despite having a share in the Maliki government, by September 2011, al-Sadr began holding anti-Maliki rallies, as he became frustrated with what he viewed as the Iran-backed tyranny of Maliki. In December 2011, al-Sadr again openly opposed the Maliki government and called for new elections.

On August 6, 2013, al-Sadr announced his retirement from politics and dissolution of the Mahdi Army. However, its members continued to follow al-Sadr and the Sadrist Movement remained in Iraqi politics. After the fall of Mosul, al-Sadr formed the Peace Brigades. The Peace Brigades aimed to defeat the Islamic State and to end Iranian involvement in Iraqi affairs, as well as the resignation of Nouri al-Maliki. In 2014, Maliki was replaced with Haider al-Abadi. Hayder al-Abadi was much less reliant on Iran, and al-Sadr quickly pledged his support. Since al-Abadi became Prime Minister, the Peace Companies worked closely with the Iraqi Army in the fight against the Islamic State. Although the Peace Companies were allied with the new Iraqi government in the fight against the Islamic State, they rejected assistance from the United States and threatened to fight American troops if they came to Iraq. In January 2016, al-Sadr called on al-Abadi to reform his government. When the deadline passed in March 2016, al-Sadr himself entered the Green Zone, declaring that he was ready to die for the demands. He set up a tent in the middle of the Green Zone where he remained for five days until his requests were partially met. Although al-Sadr has studied in Iranian seminaries, and was exiled in Iran, his relationship with Iran was strained.

Asa’ib Ahl al-Haq, Kata'ib Hezbollah, and the Badr Brigades were financed and influenced by Iran, although to different extents, while the Sadrists were more nationalist and largely rejected Iranian interference in Iraq. The Mahdi Army had occasionally accepted Iranian aid. The Mahdi Army believed that Iraqi Shia Arabs, rather than "Persian interlopers", were the leaders of the Iraqi Shia community, and asserted that the Iraqi government should put the interests of Iraqi Shias first, regardless of what Iran thinks about it.

After the arrest of Qais al-Khazali, Akram al-Kabi temporarily assumed leadership of AAH until the release of al-Khazali in early 2010. In 2008, Muqtada al-Sadr demanded that al-Kabi reunite AAH with the Mahdi Army, but Kabi refused. AAH continued to clash with the Mahdi Army.

During the Iraqi political crisis, Iranian control over the Shia militias weakened. In 2021, Iran-backed militias stormed Baghdad, angry at the success of Muqtada al-Sadr in the 2021 Iraq parliamentary election. In 2022, Sadrists who were angry about Iranian influence in Iraq, stormed the Iraqi parliament, later dispersing. On 31 August, a huge battle broke out between the Sadrists and several Iran-backed militias, which quickly spread to southern Iraq. Sadrist militiamen shut down AAH and Badr headquarters in many areas. Muqtada al-Sadr later called for an end to the attacks. The Peace Companies and AAH clashed in Basra in September 2022, resulting in 4 dead. In April 2023, in Baghdad, after a period of extreme tension between Kata'ib Hezbollah and the Peace Companies, both sides were ready to fight until the Iraqi government intervened and prevented clashes.
