= Battle of Baghdad (2006–2008) =

Part of the Iraqi insurgency

- Part of the Iraqi civil war
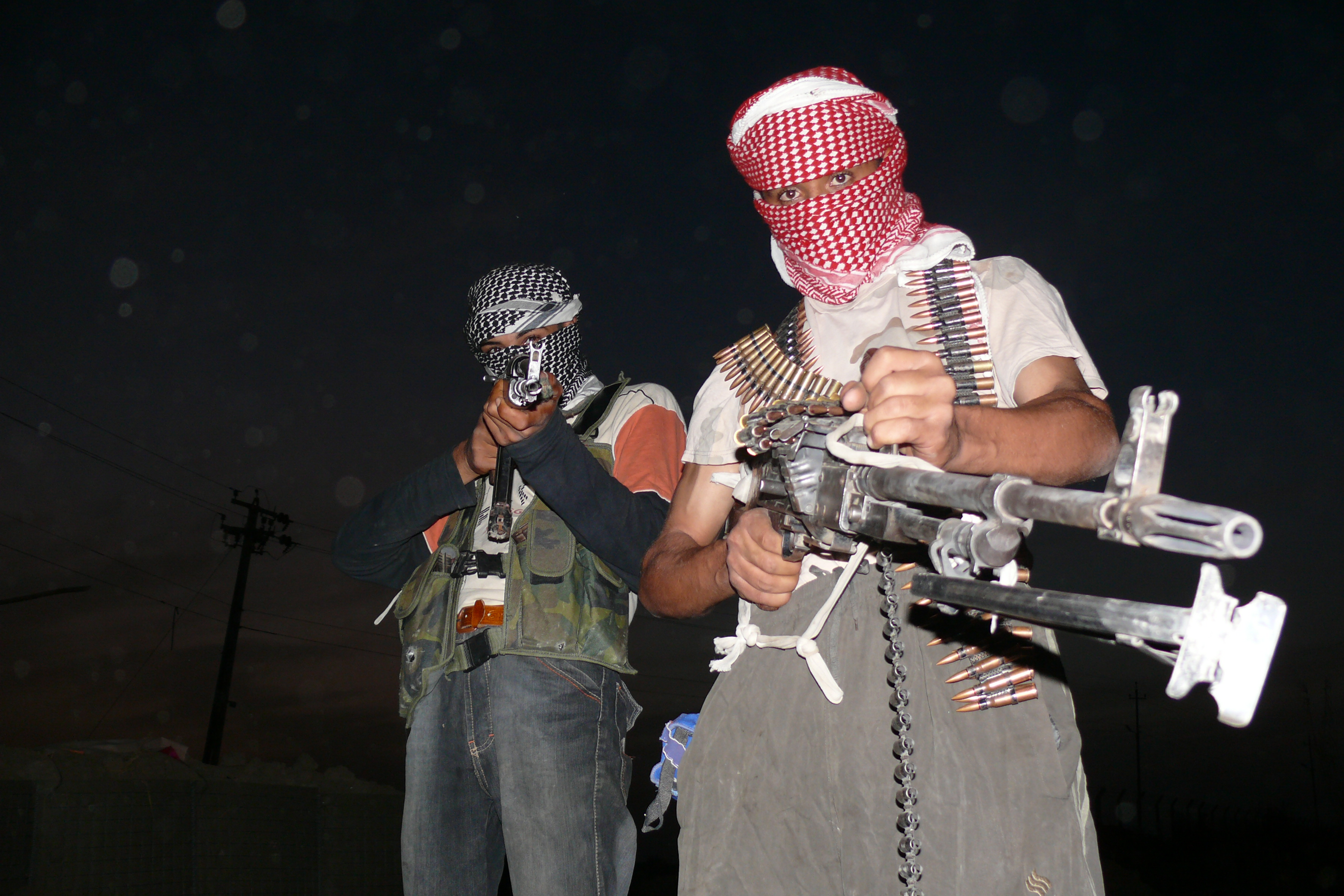
- Armed Iraqi insurgents in November 2006
| Date | 22 February 2006 – 11 May 2008 (2 years, 2 months, 2 weeks and 5 days) |
| Location | Iraq |
| Result | Iraqi and allied victory: Shia insurgents control 75% of Baghdad by 2006; Ethnic cleansing of neighborhoods by sectarian militants |

Belligerents
| (Iraq) Iraqi security forces; Iraqi Army; Iraqi Police; United States; United Kingdom; Other coalition forces; Badr Brigades; Sunni Awakening movement | Sunni factions: al-Qaeda in Iraq (until October 2006); Islamic State of Iraq (from October 2006); Sunni tribes; Other militias | Shia factions; Mahdi Army; Special Groups; Asa'ib Ahl al-Haq; Kata'ib Hezbollah; Promised Day Brigades; Rogue elements of the Iraqi security forces; Shia tribes; Other militias; Soldiers of Heaven |

Commanders and leaders
| (Iraq) Jalal Talabani (Iraq) Ibrahim al-Jaafari (Iraq) Nouri al-Maliki; Abdul Sattar Abu Risha †; Ahmad Abu Risha (United States) John Abizaid | Abu Ayyub al-Masri; Abu Omar al-Baghdadi | Muqtada al-Sadr; Abu Deraa; Qais al-Khazali (POW); Akram al-Kaabi; Arkan al-Hasnawi †Abdul Aziz al-Hakim; Abu Mustafa al-Sheibani |

Strength
| 90,000+ | Unknown | Unknown |

Casualties and losses
| Unknown | Unknown | Unknown |
- 11,000+ recorded civilian deaths (as of late 2007)

The Battle of Baghdad began in February 2006 and continued until May 2008, for control of the capital city of Iraq. A combined force of Iraqi security forces and the allies including the U.S. Army fought against insurgents to retain control of the city during the sectarian civil war that engulfed the country in 2006.

The battle coincided with an unsuccessful coalition operation called Together Forward, which was to significantly reduce the violence in Baghdad which had seen a sharp uprise in sectarian violence since the mid-February 2006 bombing of the Askariya Mosque, a major Shia Muslim shrine. Insurgents managed take control of more than 80 percent of Baghdad before an offensive conducted by Iraqi forces and allies to secure Baghdad. Insurgents also made huge gains in the western Al Anbar and southern Babil province, temporarily forcing Coalition and Iraqi security forces from many towns and cities. Most direct insurgent control of Baghdad ended by late 2007, and by mid-2008, Iraqi forces and allies mostly secured Baghdad and reached an agreement with Mahdi army to allow government forces to enter and patrol the Sadr City district of the city, thus fully securing Baghdad and restoring calm in the central parts of Iraq.
