= Special Groups (Iraq) =

Coalition designation for Iraqi paramilitary groups

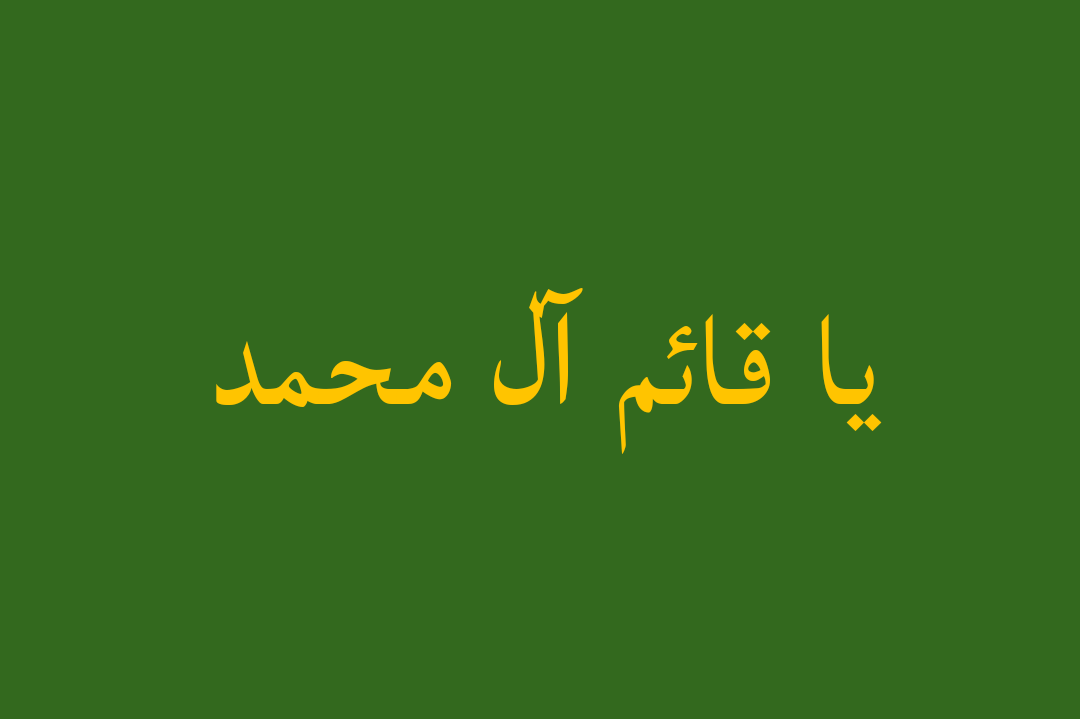
- Flags used by organisations inside the special groups
- Leaders: Muqtada al-Sadr; Qais al-Khazali; Akram al-Kaabi; Abu Mustafa al-Sheibani; Sayyid Ahmad Sajad al-Gharawi; Abu Deraa; Arkan Hasnawi †; Haydar al-Majidi
- Dates active: 2007–2011
- Allegiance: Iran (IRGC majority, allegedly)
- Groups: Asa'ib Ahl al-Haq; Promised Day Brigades; Hezbollah Brigades
- Headquarters: Sadr City and southern iraq
- Active regions: Sadr City and southern Iraq
- Ideology: Shi'a Islamism; Iraqi nationalism Factions: Anti-Sunnism
- Size: Around 60,000+ (before 2008); 7,000+ (2011)
- Part of: Iraqi insurgency iraqi civil war (2006-2008)
- Wars: Iraq War
- Flag

Special Groups (SGs) is a designation given by the United States military to the cell-based Shi'a paramilitary organizations operating within Iraq. The USA states these groups are funded, trained, and armed by the Iranian Quds Force, part of the Islamic Revolutionary Guard Corps (IRGC). According to the United States Department of Defense, 603 American troops in total were confirmed to have been killed by IRGC-backed Shia militias (Special Groups) during the Iraq War.

According to US General Kevin J. Bergner, the Special Groups receive between 750,000 and 3,000,000 dollars funding per month from the Quds Force. These groups are separate from but allied with the Mahdi Army of Muqtada al-Sadr. The distinction between these groups and the Mahdi Army became more clear when al-Sadr called for a ceasefire at the end of August 2007 following Mahdi Army clashes with Iraqi Security Forces in Karbala but the Special Groups continued fighting. After the Mahdi Army's disbandment in 2008, the Promised Day Brigades emerged as its successor; however, the largest special group to emerge after the Iraq spring fighting of 2008 was Asa'ib Ahl al-Haq (also known as the Khazali Network). According to the Guardian newspaper in March 2014, Asa'ib Ahl al-Haq was controlled by Iran under Quds Force General Qasem Soleimani, who was killed in 2020. Another large special group is Kata'ib Hezbollah (or Hezbollah Brigades) which started to operate independently from the Mahdi Army and the other Special Groups. Suspected leaders include Qais al-Khazali, Laith al-Khazali, Ali al-Lami, Azhar al-Dulaimi, Akram al-Kaabi, Abu Mustafa al-Sheibani, Abu Mahdi al-Muhandis and Abu Deraa.

== History ==
Since the Islamic Revolution, Iran has sought to back Shia Islamist paramilitary organizations across the Middle East. Many have been close to the Iranian state, particularly the Islamic Revolutionary Guard Corps, like the Movement of Vanguard Missionaries and the Supreme Council for Islamic Revolution in Iraq (SCIRI). During the Iran–Iraq War many of these groups fought for Iran, with SCIRI's Badr Brigade being led by Iranian officers. After the US-led overthrow of Saddam Hussein, these Iranian-led militia men returned to Iraq where they retained their autonomy and Iran continued to support Shia Islamist paramilitaries.

In February 2010, Asaib Ahl al-Haq kidnapped U.S. contractor Issa T. Salomi, a naturalized American from Iraq. They released a video of him where he read their demands, calling for the release of all the group's members, including several of the group's leaders who were imprisoned. He was released in March 2010 in exchange for four AAH militants being held in Iraqi custody. Iran supported three Shiite groups in Iraq that tried to attack American bases, stated Commander of US forces in Iraq, US General Ray Odierno (1954–2021), on July 21, 2010, during the Occupation of Iraq (2003–2011). The Iranians have "gone to a more sophisticated program with a smaller set of extremists" and are now focusing on three groups, which he identified as Kataib Hezbollah, Asaib Ahl al-Haq (League of the Righteous), and the Promised Day Brigade.

As of 2011, according to American officials, the Promised Day Brigades was the largest, with over 5,000 fighters. It posed the biggest, long-term security threat to Iraq. Kata'ib Hezbollah was said to have around 1,000 fighters: it was the most reliant on Iranian support. Asa'ib al-Haq was said to have less than 1,000 fighters as of 2011: it received a reported 5 million per month in Iranian funding. The Promised Day Brigades was said to receive the least amount of Iranian funding: it was the most independent of the three.

At the start of the Iraqi war against ISIS, the Special Groups joined the Popular Mobilization Forces to fight against the Islamic State of Iraq and the Levant.

== Leaders ==
Name	Group	Rank	Status
Muqtada al-Sadr	Promised Day Brigade	Spiritual Leader	In Iran, since 2006. Returned to Iraq in January 2011.
Qais al-Khazali	Asa'ib Ahl al-Haq	Leader	Captured on March 20, 2007 in Basra, released on January 5, 2010
Laith al-Khazali	Asa'ib Ahl al-Haq	Deputy Leader	Captured on March 20, 2007 in Basra, released June 9, 2009
Akram al-Kabi	Asa'ib Ahl al-Haq	Acting leader	At large
Abu Mustafa al-Sheibani	Sheibani Network	Leader	In Tehran, Iran, since 2008. Returned to Iraq in September 2010.
Abu Mahdi al-Muhandis	Kata'ib Hezbollah; Quds Force	Top Advisor to Kata'ib Hezbollah and Iran's Quds Force	Killed in a U.S. drone strike on January 3, 2020
Azhar al Dulaimi	Asa'ib Ahl al-Haq	Karbala Raid mastermind	Killed May 18, 2007 by U.S. forces in Baghdad
Ali Musa Daqduq	Asa'ib Ahl al-Haq; Hezbollah	Top advisor to Qais al-Khazali; Head of Hezbollah operations in Iraq	Captured on March 20, 2007 in Basra, handed over to Iraqi authorities on December 15, 2011 Released November 2012.
Abu Yaser al-Sheibani	Sheibani Network	Deputy Leader	Captured on April 20, 2007
Ali Faisal al-Lami	Asa'ib Ahl al-Haq (INC)	Senior Commander; Political leader	Captured on August 28, 2008, released in August 2009
Tahseen al Freiji	Promised Day Brigade	Social Political Leader	At Large
Akran Hasnawi	Hasnawi Network	Leader	Killed on May 3, 2008 in Sadr City
Mahdi Khaddam Alawi al-Zirjawi	Promised Day Brigade	SG Sadr City Commander	At Large
Baqir al-Sa'idi	Promised Day Brigade	Training	In Iran, possibly returned to Sadr City
Jawad Kazim al Tulaybani	Promised Day Brigade	Rocket Specialist	At Large
Haydar Mehdi Khadum al-Fawadi	Own Group	Leader	At Large
Sheikh Abd al-Hadi al-Darraji	Asa'ib Ahl al-Haq (Sadr Movement)	Financer; Political/Religious leader	Arrested January 10, 2007, released 26 June 2009
Abu Deraa	Own Group; AAH since 2010	Leader; High-level commander	Fled to Iran in late 2008. Returned to Iraq in on 20 August 2010.
Ahmad Abu Sajad al-Gharawi	Own Group in Maysan	Leader	At Large
Mohamed al-Zameli	unknown	Local commander (Wasit)	Detained on 23 January 2009
Muhammad al-Tabatabai	Asa'ib Ahl al-Haq	Cleric	At large

== See also ==
- Harakat Hezbollah al-Nujaba
- Kata'ib Sayyid al-Shuhada
- Kata'ib al-Imam Ali
- Jaysh al-Mu'ammal
- Liwa Assad Allah
- Hezbollah (Lebanon)
- Hezbollah al-Hejaz (Saudi Arabia)
- Liwa Fatemiyoun (Syria)
- Liwa Zainebiyoun (Syria)
- Harakah al-Sabireen (Palestine)
- Islamic Movement (Nigeria)
