= Iraqi civil war (2006–2008) =

Middle Eastern conflict (2006–2008)

- Part of the Iraq War
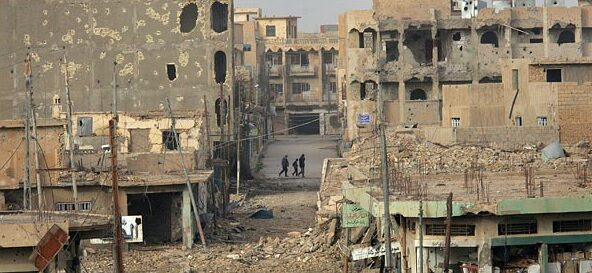
- A city street in Ramadi heavily damaged by the fighting in 2006
Date	22 February 2006 – 15 May 2008 (2 years, 2 months, 3 weeks and 2 days)
Location	Iraq
Result	Iraqi government and allied victory: Islamic State of Iraq territorially defeated by mid-2008; Ceasefire signed with Mahdi Army in May 2008; American troop surge in 2007; 4 million people displaced; Presence of British and American troops in advise and assist roles until the US withdrawal in 2011; Resurgence of Islamic State of Iraq, which later established ISIL in 2013

Belligerents
Iraq; United States; United Kingdom; Other coalition forces Private Security Contractors (Kurdistan Region) Peshmerga; Sons of Iraq; Badr Organization	Mahdi Army (until 2008); Special Groups: Asa'ib Ahl al-Haq; Kata'ib Hezbollah; Promised Day Brigades (from 2008); Soldiers of Heaven; Several Shia tribes	Al-Qaeda: Al-Qaeda in Iraq (until January 2006); Mujahideen Shura Council (January 2006 – October 2006); Islamic State of Iraq (from October 2006); Islamic Army in Iraq; Ansar al-Sunna (Ba'athist Iraq) Naqshbandi Army; 1920 Revolution Brigade; Hamas of Iraq; Islamic Front for the Iraqi Resistance; Jaish al-Mujahideen; Several Sunni tribes

Commanders and leaders
(Iraq) Nouri al-Maliki (Iraq) Jalal Talabani (Iraq) Ibrahim al-Jaafari (United States) Tommy Franks (Kurdistan Region) Masoud Barzani; Abdul Sattar Abu Risha †; Ahmed Abu Risha	Muqtada al-Sadr; Abu Deraa; Akram al-Kaabi; Qais al-Khazali (POW); Arkan Hasnawi †; Abdul Aziz al-Hakim; Hadi al-Amiri; Abu Mustafa al-Sheibani; Dia Abdul Zahra Kadim †; Ahmed Alhasan	Abu Musab al-Zarqawi †; Abu Omar al-Baghdadi; Abu Abdullah al-Shafi'i (POW); Abu Hamza al-Muhajir; Abu Suleiman al-Naser; Ishmael Jubouri (Ba'athist Iraq) Izzat Ibrahim al-Douri

Strength
Iraqi Security Forces; 618,000 (805,269 Army and 348,000 Police); Coalition; ~49,700; Contractors; ~7,000; Awakening Council militias 103,000	Mahdi Army: 60,000 (2003–2008); Badr Organisation: 20,000; Soldiers of Heaven: 1,000; Special Groups: 7,000 (2011)	Sunni insurgents: 70,000 (2003–2007) Foreign Mujahedeen: 1,300
- *Some casualties were related to the local crime.

The Iraqi civil war was an armed conflict from 2006 to 2008 between various sectarian Shia and Sunni armed groups, such as the Islamic State of Iraq and the Mahdi Army, in addition to the Iraqi government alongside American-led coalition forces. In February 2006, the insurgency against the coalition and government escalated into a sectarian civil war after the bombing of Al-Askari Shrine, considered a holy site in Twelver Shi'ism. US President George W. Bush and Iraqi officials accused al-Qaeda in Iraq (AQI) of orchestrating the bombing. AQI publicly denied any links. The incident set off a wave of attacks on Sunni civilians by Shia militants, followed by attacks on Shia civilians by Sunni militants.

The UN Secretary General stated in September 2006 that if patterns of discord and violence continued, the Iraqi state was in danger of breaking up. On 10 January 2007, Bush said that "80% of Iraq's sectarian violence occurs within 30 miles (48 km) of the capital. This violence is splitting Baghdad into sectarian enclaves, and shakes the confidence of all Iraqis." By late 2007, the National Intelligence Estimate described the conflict as having elements of a civil war. In 2008, during the Sunni Awakening and the U.S. troop surge, violence declined dramatically. However, an insurgency by ISI continued to plague Iraq following the U.S. withdrawal in late 2011. In June 2014, the Islamic State of Iraq and the Levant, the successor to Islamic State of Iraq, launched a major military offensive against the Iraqi government and declared a self-proclaimed worldwide Islamic caliphate. This led to another full-scale war from 2013 to 2017, in which the Iraqi government declared victory.

In October 2006, the Office of the United Nations High Commissioner for Refugees (UNHCR) and the Iraqi government estimated that more than 370,000 Iraqis had been displaced since 2006, bringing the total number of Iraqi refugees to more than 1.6 million. By 2008, the UNHCR raised the estimate to about 4.7 million (~16% of the population). The number estimated abroad was 2 million (a number close to CIA projections) and the number of internally displaced people was 2.7 million. The Red Cross stated in 2008 that Iraq's humanitarian situation was among the most critical in the world, with millions of Iraqis forced to rely on insufficient and poor-quality water sources.

According to the Failed States Index, produced by Foreign Policy and the Fund for Peace, Iraq was one of the world's top 5 unstable states from 2005 to 2008.

== Participants ==
A multitude of groups formed the Iraqi insurgency, which arose in a piecemeal fashion as a reaction to local events, notably the realisation of the U.S. military's inability to control Iraq. Beginning in 2005, the insurgent forces coalesced around several main factions, including the Islamic Army in Iraq and Ansar al-Sunna. Religious justification was used to support the political actions of these groups, as well as a marked adherence to Salafism, branding those against the jihad as non-believers. This approach played a role in the rise of sectarian violence. The U.S. military also believed that between 5 and 10% of insurgent forces were non-Iraqi Arabs.

Al-Qaeda in Iraq (AQI) and groups associated with it steadily became a brutal and wasteful foreign occupation force, engaging Yemeni, Saudi, Moroccan, Palestinian, Syrian and Lebanese foreign fighters. Independent Shi'a militias identified themselves around sectarian ideology and possessed various levels of influence and power. Some militias were founded in exile and returned to Iraq only after the toppling of Saddam Hussein, such as the Badr Organization. Others were created since the state collapse, the largest and most uniform of which was the Mahdi Army established by Muqtada al-Sadr and believed to have around 50,000 fighters.

== Conflict and tactics ==
=== Non-military targets ===
Attacks on non-military and civilian targets began in August 2003 as an attempt to sow chaos and sectarian discord. Iraqi casualties increased over the next several years.

By the end of 2008, where the civil war had ended, there was evidence of a decrease in civilian casualties, and likewise in ethno-sectarian casualties. The commanding general of the Multi-National Force-Iraq (MNF-I), Raymond Odierno, testified before the House Armed Services Committee in September 2009 that overall attacks had decreased 85% in the last two years from 4064 in August 2007 to 594 in August. 2009: with 563 attacks in September (through September 28).

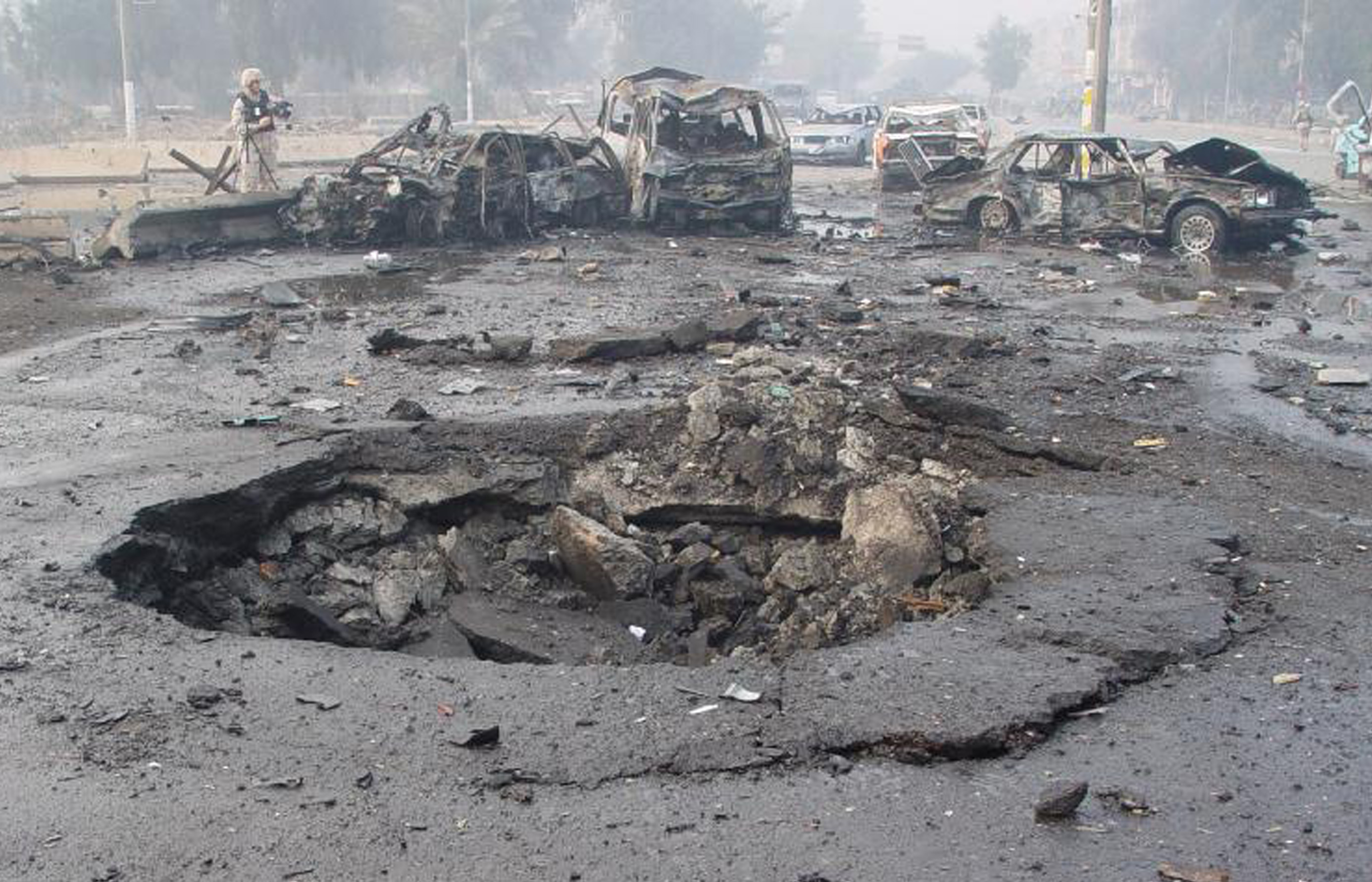
Aftermath of a car bombing in Baghdad in December 2007

=== Bomb and mortar attacks ===
Bomb attacks aimed at civilians usually targeted crowded places such as marketplaces and mosques in Shi'a cities and districts. The bombings, which were sometimes co-ordinated, often inflicted extreme casualties.

For example, the 23 November 2006 Sadr City bombings killed at least 215 people and injured hundreds more in the Sadr City district of Baghdad, sparking reprisal attacks, and the 3 February 2007 Baghdad market bombing killed at least 135 and injured more than 300. The co-ordinated 2 March 2004 Iraq Ashura bombings (including car bombs, suicide bombers and mortar, grenade and rocket attacks) killed at least 178 people and injured at least 500.

==== Suicide bombings ====
Since August 2003, suicide car bombs were increasingly used as weapons by Sunni militants, primarily al-Qaeda extremists. The car bombs, known in the military as vehicle-borne improvised explosive devices (VBIEDs), emerged as one of the militants' most effective weapons, directed not only against civilian targets but also against Iraqi police stations and recruiting centers.

These vehicle IEDs were often driven by the extremists from foreign Muslim countries with a history of militancy, such as Saudi Arabia, Algeria, Egypt, and Pakistan. Multiple suicide bombings had roughly the same target distribution as single blasts: about three-quarters of single and multiple blasts were sent against Iraqi targets.

=== Death squads ===
Death squad-style killings in Iraq took place in a variety of ways. Kidnapping, followed by often extreme torture (such as boring holes in people's feet with drills) and execution-style killings, sometimes public (in some cases, beheadings), emerged as another tactic. In some cases, tapes of the execution were distributed for propaganda purposes. The bodies were usually dumped on a roadside or in other places, several at a time. There were also several relatively large-scale massacres, like the Hay al Jihad massacre in which some 40 Sunnis were killed in a response to the car bombing which killed a dozen Shi'a.

The death squads were often disgruntled Shi'a, including members of the security forces, who killed Sunnis in revenge attacks they blamed the insurgency against the Shi'a-dominated government.

Allegations of the existence of the death squads, made up of Shiites, and their role in executions of Sunnis, began to be promulgated when Bayan Jabr took over the Interior Ministry, although there was no exact proof. On top of that the Badr Brigade, a military wing of the pro-Iranian Supreme Council of the Islamic Revolution in Iraq, was accused of being behind the killings.

Iraq Body Count project data shows that 33% of civilian deaths during the Iraq War resulted from execution after abduction or capture. These were overwhelmingly carried out by unknown actors including insurgents, sectarian militias and criminals. Such killings occurred much more frequently during the 2006–07 period of sectarian violence.

=== Attacks on places of worship ===
On 22 February 2006, a highly provocative explosion took place at the al-Askari Mosque in the Iraqi city of Samarra, one of the holiest sites in Shi'a Islam, believed to have been caused by a bomb planted by al-Qaeda in Iraq. With the explicit strategic goal of triggering a "sectarian war", Al-Zarqawi hoped that through such a sectarian conflict he could rally Iraq's Sunnis behind a common cause against the Shiite-dominated government in Baghdad and the U.S. occupation.

Although no injuries occurred in the blast, the mosque was severely damaged and the bombing resulted in violence over the following days. Over 100 dead bodies with bullet holes were found the next day, and at least 165 people are thought to have been killed. In the aftermath of this attack the U.S. military calculated that the average homicide rate in Baghdad tripled from 11 to 33 deaths per day.

Dozens of Iraqi mosques were afterwards attacked or taken over by the sectarian forces. For example, a Sunni mosque was burnt in the southern Iraqi town of Haswa on 25 March 2007, in revenge for the destruction of a Shi'a mosque in the town the previous day. In several cases, Christian churches were also attacked by the extremists. Later, another al-Askari bombing took place in June 2007.

Iraq's Christian minority also became a target by Al Qaeda Sunnis because of conflicting theological ideas.

=== Sectarian desertions ===
Some Iraqi service members deserted the military or the police and others refused to serve in hostile areas. For example, some members of one sect refused to serve in neighborhoods dominated by other sects. The ethnic Kurdish soldiers from northern Iraq, who were mostly Sunnis but not Arabs, were also reported to be deserting the army to avoid the civil strife in Baghdad.

The deserting soldiers left behind weapons, uniforms and warehouses full of heavy weaponry. Before the fall of Mosul, the ISF was losing 300 soldiers a day to desertions and deaths.

== Timeline ==
For more information on events in a specific year, see the associated timeline page.

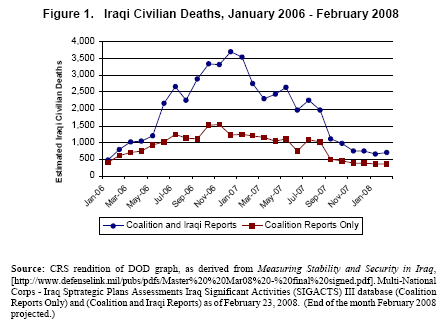
Civilian deaths attributable to insurgent or military action in Iraq, and also to increased criminal violence. For the period between January 2006 and February 2008 as rendered by the Congressional Research Service for the Department of Defense. Many of these types of civilian deaths were not reported, and this image only reports from 2006 on. Other methods of estimating civilian deaths come up with much higher numbers. See also: Casualties of the conflict in Iraq since 2003.

== Growth in refugee flight ==
- By 2008, the UNHCR raised the estimate of refugees to a total of about 4.7 million, with 2 million displaced internally and 2.7 million displaced externally. In April 2006 the Ministry of Displacement and Migration estimated that "nearly 70,000 displaced Iraqis, especially from the capital, are living in deteriorating conditions," due to ongoing sectarian violence. Roughly 40% of Iraq's middle class is believed to have fled, the U.N. said. Most were fleeing systematic persecution and had no desire to return. Refugees were mired in poverty as they were generally barred from working in their host countries. A 25 May 2007 article noted that in the past seven months only 69 people from Iraq had been granted refugee status in the United States.

== Iraqi Civil War from the theories of civil warfare ==
Each theory summarizes and illuminates a certain set of causes that triggered the sectarian civil war in Iraq since 2006.

- "Weak State"

Iraq was already a weak state before the invasion in 2003, with multiple economic sanctions that affected the capacity of the Iraqi state. The Saddam regime lacked legitimacy as the people did not perceive it as a legitimate ruler at the time of the U.S. invasion. The key factor evidencing the lack of Iraqi state capacity is the inability to provide security for its inhabitants.

- "State failure"

The failure of the state was a trigger for the civil war. After the invasion by the US government, lawlessness was present which triggered a security vacuum. The sectarian security dilemma was triggered by the security vacuum of the collapse of the state and the subsequent period of violence after the al-Askari mosque bombing.

- "Poor Leadership"

Economic and political problems undermined the Iraqi state, stemming from previous wars in which Iraq was involved. The sectarian basis of Saddam's regime delimited the conflict that was taking place between Sunnis, Shiites and Kurds, which meant that poor leadership had incurred in triggering the civil war.

- "Economy"

The economy is a key factor in understanding the development of the sectarian conflict that occurred. The Sunnis, compared to other ethnic groups, had more purchasing power due to higher job preferences and wages during Saddam's rule. With the U.S. invasion and the fall of Saddam, thousands of Sunnis were left without jobs, leading them to join the insurgency. Control of oil was also a factor, thanks to non-existent legislation on the dispersal of oil revenues.

== Use of "civil war" label ==
The use of the term "civil war" has been controversial, with a number of commentators preferring the term "civil conflict". A weak state, defined as lacking legitimacy, capacity and effective and functional institutions, is the main permissive cause of civil war.

A poll of over 5,000 Iraqi nationals found that 27% of polled Iraqi residents agreed that Iraq was in a civil war, while 61% thought Iraq was not. Two similar polls of Americans conducted in 2006 found that between 65% and 85% believed Iraq was in a civil war.

In the United States, the term has been politicized. Deputy leader of the United States Senate, Dick Durbin, referred to "this civil war in Iraq" in a criticism of the President's Address to the Nation by George W. Bush's on 10 January 2007.

Edward Wong on 26 November 2006 paraphrased a report from a group of American professors at Stanford University that the insurgency in Iraq amounted to the classic definition of a civil war.

An unclassified summary of the 90-page January 2007 National Intelligence Estimate, titled Prospects for Iraq's Stability: A Challenging Road Ahead, states the following regarding the use of the term "civil war":

The Intelligence Community judges that the term "civil war" does not adequately capture the complexity of the conflict in Iraq, which includes extensive Shi'a-on-Shi'a violence, al-Qa'ida and Sunni insurgent attacks on Coalition forces, and widespread criminally motivated violence. Nonetheless, the term "civil war" accurately describes key elements of the Iraqi conflict, including the hardening of ethno-sectarian identities, a sea change in the character of the violence, ethno-sectarian mobilization, and population displacements.

Retired United States Army General Barry McCaffrey issued a report on 26 March 2007, after a trip and analysis of the situation in Iraq. The report labeled the situation a "low-grade civil war". In page 3 of the report, he writes that:

Iraq is ripped by a low-grade civil war which has worsened to catastrophic levels with as many as 3000 citizens murdered per month. The population is in despair. Life in many of the urban areas is now desperate. A handful of foreign fighter (500+)—and a couple thousand Al Qaeda operatives incite open factional struggle through suicide bombings which target Shia holy places and innocent civilians. ... The police force is feared as a Shia militia in uniform which is responsible for thousands of extra-judicial killings.

== See also ==
- Iraq conflict (2003–present)
- Casualties of the conflict in Iraq since 2003
- Shi'a–Sunni relations
- Iraqi insurgency
- Refugees of Iraq

Events:

- 2 March 2004 Iraq Ashura bombings
- 23 November 2006 Sadr City bombings
- 22 January 2007 Baghdad bombings
- 3 February 2007 Baghdad market bombing
- Hay al Jihad massacre

General:

- Ethnic cleansing
- Ethnic conflict
- Sectarianism
- Religion in Iraq
- Religious war

Films

- Iraq in Fragments, documentary (2006)

== Bibliography ==
- Iraq Study Group, The Iraq Study Group Report: The Way Forward – A New Approach (2006)
- Nir Rosen, In the Belly of the Green Bird: The Triumph of the Martyrs in Iraq (2006)
