= Sheibani Network =

Iraqi smuggling network

- Leader: Abu Mustafa al-Sheibani
- Dates active: 2003–2011
- Active regions: Southern Iraq and Baghdad
- Size: 280 (as of 2005)
- Part of: Iraqi insurgency Special Groups
- Wars: the Iraq War

The Sheibani Network was an Iraqi smuggling network and Shi'a Insurgent group led by Abu Mustafa al-Sheibani, an ex-commander of the Supreme Council for Islamic Revolution in Iraq's Badr Brigades. The Badr Brigades' militiamen and supply lines became known collectively as the “Sheibani Network,” which maintained links to Asa'ib Ahl al-Haq (AAH) and to Kata'ib Hezbollah. The group was believed to be used by Iran's Revolutionary Guards' Quds Force to supply Iraqi Special Groups. The group is alleged to be responsible for numerous attacks on Iraqi and Coalition forces. In 2009 the American Enterprise Institute believed that the network consisted of 280 members, divided in 17 units. US commanders estimated that weapons smuggled and used by the group were responsible for the death of 170 and injuries to 600 American soldiers by February 2007. Beginning in February 2013, reports from Iraqi newspapers Al Masalah and Kitabat claimed splits had emerged within Kata'ib Hezbollah, leading to the expulsion of al-Sheibani as its leader. In May 2013 al-Sheibani founded Kata'ib Sayyid al-Shuhada, but retired from his role as leader in 2014 when he became an advisor to Iraqi Interior Minister Mohammed Al-Ghabban.

== History ==
After the 2003 Invasion of Iraq, ex-Badr commander Abu Mustafa al-Sheibani set up his own logistics, arms, and financing network using his connections with the Badr Organisation, which he also supplied. In January 2005 he was recruited by the Quds Force to supply the Muqtada al-Sadr's Jaish al-Mahdi (JAM) as well as a splinter group led by Qais al-Khazali: the Khazali Network, which would later become AAH. The Sheibani Network, via old Badr smuggling routes trafficked explosively formed penetrators (EFPs), improvised explosive devices (IEDs), 107mm rockets, 122mm rockets, Katyusha rockets, and a variety of mortars into Iraq. They also made bombs themselves. Other than weapons, the group also smuggled money, designated for special groups, from Iran to Iraq and transported militiamen from other groups from Iraq to Iran and Lebanon to receive training.

The group itself also took part in insurgent activities, and is alleged to be involved in the killing of six British Royal Military Policemen in June 2003 by a mob in Majar al-Kabir, Maysan Governorate. They are also said to be responsible for a roadside bombing which killed 3 British soldiers in July 2005 in al-Amarah and an attack in August 2005 against an embassy convoy in Basra which killed 3 British bodyguards. By September 2005 the group was alleged to be responsible for the death of at least 11 British soldiers. The group's fighters are said to have received training from the Quds Force and Lebanese Shi'a militia Hezbollah. They have also been alleged to be responsible for the assassinations of local police chiefs hostile to Shi'a militia and politicians who are against Iranian influence, such as the Police Chief of Najaf, the Deputy-Governor of Najaf Governorate and Muhammad al-Friji, an Iraqi Colonel.

The group's activities were said to be increasing in mid-2010 and it was said to be closely cooperating with Asa'ib Ahl al-Haq. The network is believed to have dissolved by 2014.
