= Azhar al-Dulaimi =

Fighter in Mahdi army

Azhar al-Dulaymi
- ازهر الدليمي
- Azhar al-Dulaymi – a suspected member of the Special Group Members.
- Died: May 19, 2007; Baghdad
- Occupation: Insurgent
- Known for: Leading the Karbala provincial headquarters raid

Azhar al-Dulaymi was the mastermind of the January 20, 2007 attack in Karbala where English-speaking fighters, wearing US military uniforms and carrying American weapons, attacked a joint military command headquarters, leaving five US soldiers dead. Al-Dulaimi was believed to be a member of the Khazali Network, a Mahdi Army faction. He was tracked down and killed by U.S. forces on May 19, 2007, in Sadr City. The U.S. military had received intelligence reports that al-Dulaimi received training and funding from the Iranian Revolutionary Guard Corps and Hezbollah.

On October 22, 2010, The New York Times reported that in the Iraq War documents leak, US intelligence analysts described why they thought al-Dulaimi had been trained in the "dark arts of paramilitary operation" by Iran and Hezbollah.

Dulaymi reportedly obtained his training from Hizballah operatives near Qom, Iran, who were under the supervision of Iranian Islamic Revolutionary Guard Corps Quds Force (IRGC-QF) officers in July 2006.

On October 25, 2010, the Foreign Policy Journal published an article skeptical of the conclusions The New York Times had drawn from the leaked documents.

According to Kimberly Kagan's The Surge: A Military History, Dulaimi was "the executor of the Ministry of Health and Karbala attacks". Bill Roggio, writing in the Long War Journal also attributed an attack on the Karbala Provincial Joint Coordination Center to Dulaimi.

According to Mark Urban's book on Special Forces in Iraq, Task Force Black, documents seized on March 20, 2007, when Qais Khazali and Ali Musa Daqduq were captured, described al-Dulaimi's role in the Karbala attack and provided sufficient information for the raid where al-Dulaimi died.
