= Sattar Alghanem =

Iraqi politician

Sattar Alghanem ستار الغانم

Member of Parliament for Baghdad
- Incumbent
- Assumed office 15 July 2009
- President: Fuad Masum

Personal details
- Born: February 2, 1967 (age 59) Baghdad, Iraq
- Party: Badr Organization
- Education: Baghdad University

Sattar Jabar Alghanem (Arabic:ستار الغانم) (born 2 February 1967) is an Iraqi politician who served as a deputy in the Iraqi parliament. He is a leader in the Badr Organization. Holds a PhD in Social Psychology.

== Positions ==
- Deputy in the Iraqi parliament.
- Worked as a teacher at the Faculty of Arts, Al-Mustansiriya University since 2002.
- Head of Scientific Department, Faculty of Arts, Al-Mustansiriya University, 2003.
- Presented to postgraduate students (Masters and PhD) and supervised several postgraduate studies, and also participated in the discussion of a number of letters and letters
- Head of the Scientific Supervision and Evaluation Unit at the Ministry of Higher Education and Scientific Research - the rank of Undersecretary
- Holds a master's degree from the Faculty of Arts / Al-Mustansiriya University in 1996.
