= Hayy Al-Jihad massacre =

2006 massacre in Baghdad, Iraq

- Part of the Iraqi civil war and the Iraq War
- Location: Baghdad, Iraq
- Date: 9 July 2006
- Target: Sunni muslims
- Deaths: 270
- Injuries: 50
- Perpetrator: Mahdi army

The Hayy Al-Jihad massacre occurred on July 9, 2006 in the Hayy Al-Jihad neighborhood of the Iraqi capital, Baghdad. An estimated 270 Sunni civilians were killed in revenge attacks by Shia militiamen from the Mahdi Army for the previous unprovoked anti-Shiite killings.

== Overview ==
Tensions were high between Shia and Sunni following the 2006 al-Askari mosque bombing but then On 8 July 2006 a suicide bomber entered a Shia mosque in Baghdad and blew himself up, killing 8 worshippers.

On the morning of 9 July, masked Mahdi Army militants gathered in groups in Baghdad's Hay al Jihad neighborhood and setup their own checkpoints asking drivers and passers by for identification.

Any Sunni males among them were taken to a bus where more gunman were waiting, the bus drove to a waste ground where the captives were all murdered. By the end of the day, 36 bodies were brought into local hospitals, though the death toll maybe higher than 50; Sunni bombers carried out a double car-bomb attack on a Shia mosque in northern Baghdad, killing 19 and wounding 59. 9 July marked of 5 days of multiple suicide bombings and Shia retaliation that claimed more than 150 lives in the city.

== See also ==
- Sectarian violence in Iraq
