= Al Salam 313 =

Shia Iraqi Gang

Al Salam 313 is a political organization and criminal gang of conservative Shia Iraqis in Western Europe. The gang was founded by the style of a motorcycle club by Mohammed Bunia in Germany. The Salam 313 has members in Central and North Europe and is based on the ideology of the Iraqi Shia militia Sarāyā al-Salām (former Mahdi Army). The group threatens Iraqis in Europe who live a secular or Western lifestyle and speak against the religious Shia-led Iraqi government.

== Background and connections ==
The Salam 313 is a highly organized criminal society and organized crime group which was founded by the religious Shia, ethnically Kurdish, tribal Feyli, and Iraqi-born gangster by the name of Muhammad Bunia, who is the current the boss of the organization. "Al Salam" literally means "The Peace"; the number "313" is the number men who accompanied the Islamic Prophet Muhammad during the Battle of Badr and is said by Shias to be the number of people that will accompany the 12th Shia Imam, Muhammad al-Mahdi, when he returns to the world during the end of times.

The gang has a white dove as heraldic animal in their emblem. The white dove refers to the militia of the Shiite cleric Muqtada al-Sadr, Seraya al-Salam. They have pledged allegiance to the Popular Mobilization Forces, a branch of the Iraqi Armed Forces without being under control of the Iraqi government.

Gang members are known in Germany, Sweden, Denmark and the Netherlands.

== Police assessment and action ==
In May 2019 German police took action against Al-Salam 313, targeting 34 suspects. 800 police officers including SEKs (Spezialeinsatzkommandos) and officers of state security searched a total of 49 residential properties in Cologne area and the Ruhr area.

The gang is also seen in the context of Middle East family clans, involved in crime in Germany. The North Rhine-Westphalian state office of criminal investigation (LKA) saw no reason to put the merger on a par with "Outlaw Motorcycle Gangs", like "Hells Angels" and "Bandidos". The LKA also does not want to classify the group as "rocker-like".
