= Abu Mustafa al-Sheibani =

Smuggler, insurgent

- Born: 1959 (age 66–67); Nasiriyah, Iraqi Republic
- Military career
- Allegiance: Badr Brigades (1980s–2003); Special Groups
- Service years: 2003-present
- Unit: Sheibani Network
- Commands: Kata'ib Sayyid al-Shuhada
- Conflicts: Iraq War

Hamid Thajil Warij al-Attabi (born 1959), better known by his nom de guerre Abu Mustafa al-Sheibani or Hamid al-Sheibani, is an Iraqi militant leader who commands the insurgent group and smuggling network known as the Sheibani Network, which became one of the Iraqi Special Groups. An arrest warrant was issued for him by the Central Criminal Court of Iraq on 12 April 2005 with a reward of $200,000 for information leading to his capture. In 2006 he was added to the Iraqi government's 41 Most-Wanted list. He holds both Iraqi and Iranian nationalities because he lived in exile in Iran during Saddam Hussein's rule, and later returned there to live in Tehran after 2006. In September 2010, after Iraqi Prime Minister Nouri al-Maliki formed a coalition government with Shi'a rebel leader Muqtada al-Sadr, Sheibani was allowed to return to Iraq along with Abu Deraa.

Sheibani was a former member of the Supreme Council for Islamic Revolution in Iraq's Badr Brigades, after the 2003 US-led invasion of Iraq he created an arms smuggling network linked to Iran's Quds Force. The Sheibani network was used to supply Qais Khazali's Khazali Network (also known as Asa'ib Ahl al-Haq) and other Special Groups, The group is also responsible for numerous attacks against Coalition, in particular British forces in Basra. The Sheibani network is alleged to be responsible for a bombing in July 2005 which killed three British soldiers as well as other attacks. After his return to Iraq in 2010, he joined forces with the Khazali network.

His younger brother Abu Yaser al-Sheibani, who was his second-in-command, was captured by US forces on April 20, 2007.
