= Jaber Rajabi =

Iranian political

Jaber Rajabi is an Iranian political figure, former foreign-policy adviser to Iranian president Mahmoud Ahmadinejad, and former figure in Iran-backed militia networks in Iraq. He has been described by The Jerusalem Post as a former go-between for regime-backed militias in Iraq, and by Sky News Arabia as a defector from the Quds Force of the Islamic Revolutionary Guard Corps (IRGC).

Rajabi has been described as a former coordinator between Tehran-backed Iraqi factions and as a founding member of Asa'ib Ahl al-Haq and Harakat Hezbollah al-Nujaba. After breaking with the Islamic Republic's regional network, he became a public critic of the IRGC's role inside Iran and across the Middle East, including its support for armed proxies.

Rajabi has also drawn attention for his criticism of Mojtaba Khamenei, the son of Ali Khamenei, who became Supreme Leader of Iran in 2026. Rajabi says he knew Mojtaba Khamenei from religious study in Qom, and in 2026 described him to The Jerusalem Post as more dangerous than his father.

== Early life and education ==
Rajabi has said in an interview with Sky News Arabia that he was born in Tehran in 1983. He was born into a family connected to the Islamic Republic. According to The Jerusalem Post, his father fought in the Iran–Iraq War, and his mother worked for a short period in the office of Ali Khamenei.

Before the 2003 U.S.-led invasion of Iraq, Rajabi left Iran for Iraq and studied in the Shia seminary system in Najaf. He later continued religious studies in Qom, Iran's main center of Shia clerical education. During that period, he studied alongside Mojtaba Khamenei.

== Quds Force and Iraqi militias ==
After the 2003 invasion of Iraq, Rajabi became involved in the militia environment that developed around Iran-backed Iraqi armed factions. During the 2004 Battle of Najaf, he fought alongside fighters linked to Muqtada al-Sadr against U.S. forces and was wounded. The Jerusalem Post reported that he was later recruited by the IRGC and became involved in the training and coordination of Iraqi militias.

The Washington Institute for Near East Policy describes Rajabi as a former official in more than one Iran-backed Iraqi militia, and states that he trained militias with the support of the IRGC-Quds Force and worked as a coordinator between Iraqi factions. The Jerusalem Post and Al Arabiya have described him as a founding member of both Asa'ib Ahl al-Haq and Harakat Hezbollah al-Nujaba.

Rajabi was also involved in fighting the Islamic State in Iraq. The Atlantic reported that he suffered a head injury while fighting the group near Samarra in 2017.

== Adviser to Mahmoud Ahmadinejad ==
Rajabi later returned to Iran and served as a foreign-policy adviser to President Mahmoud Ahmadinejad. Al Arabiya described him as a former adviser in Ahmadinejad's presidential office and said he remained with Ahmadinejad until the end of his second presidential term.

== Break with the Islamic Republic ==
The Washington Institute states that Rajabi defected from the so-called Axis of Resistance in 2016 and became a vocal opponent of the Islamic Republic's regional and domestic policies. Since then, he has appeared as a political analyst in Persian-language media outside Iran and has also given interviews to Arabic-language outlets.

In 2020, Independent Persian reported that Rajabi had survived arsenic poisoning in Tehran. The outlet described him as a communications figure linked to Asa'ib Ahl al-Haq in Iran and reported that documents showed a high level of arsenic in his blood. In later interviews, Rajabi said the poisoning caused long-term injuries.

== Opposition activity and public commentary ==
Since leaving Iran's militia network, Rajabi has commented on Iranian politics, the IRGC-Quds Force, Iran-backed armed groups, and Tehran's regional policy. His media appearances and commentary have addressed Iran's influence in Iraq and other regional arenas, including Lebanon, Yemen and Palestinian factions.

In a 2024 article for The Washington Institute, Rajabi argued that the killing of Qasem Soleimani on 3 January 2020 in a U.S. drone strike near Baghdad International Airport weakened the personal networks through which the Quds Force had managed allied militias. He argued that Soleimani's successor, Esmail Qaani, lacked Soleimani's personal authority and relationships with militia leaders.

In 2026, The Atlantic described Rajabi as a former insider who believed the Islamic Republic was vulnerable from within and that parts of the state could be neutralized without a full collapse into chaos.

== Views on Mojtaba Khamenei ==
Rajabi has received particular attention for his comments on Mojtaba Khamenei. He says he knew Mojtaba Khamenei from their time in religious study in Qom.

In 2026, Rajabi told The Jerusalem Post that Mojtaba Khamenei was more dangerous than Ali Khamenei, saying that he was more willing to deceive and placed less value on human life. Independent Persian also reported Rajabi's comments that Mojtaba Khamenei was more ruthless than his father and was interested in apocalyptic ideas during his religious studies in Qom. Rajabi also told The Atlantic that Mojtaba Khamenei was shaped by apocalyptic religious ideas and believed he had a special role in advancing Iran's revolutionary mission.
