= Mouin al-Kazmi =

Iraqi politician

Mouin AlKazmi معين الكاظمي

Politician
- Incumbent
- Assumed office 2014

Personal details
- Born: 1975 (age 50–51) Baghdad, Iraq
- Party: Badr Organization & Fatah Alliance
- Occupation: Politician, leading member of badr organization, member of baghdad provincial council.

Mouin AlKazmi (Arabic: معين الكاظمي) is an Iraqi politician, Leading member of Badr Organization. He is a participant in the upcoming Iraqi elections for the Fatah Alliance. He is member of Baghdad Provincial Council.

== Biography ==
AlKazmi, (Born in 1975, Baghdad Iraq) is an Iraqi politician and Assistant to the Deputy Chairman of the Popular Mobilization Forces for Combatant Affairs, Chairman of the committee to Commemorate the Tikrit Massacre.He entered the Iraqi elections as a candidate for the Fatah Alliance.
