= Hafsa (name) =

Hafsa or Hafsah
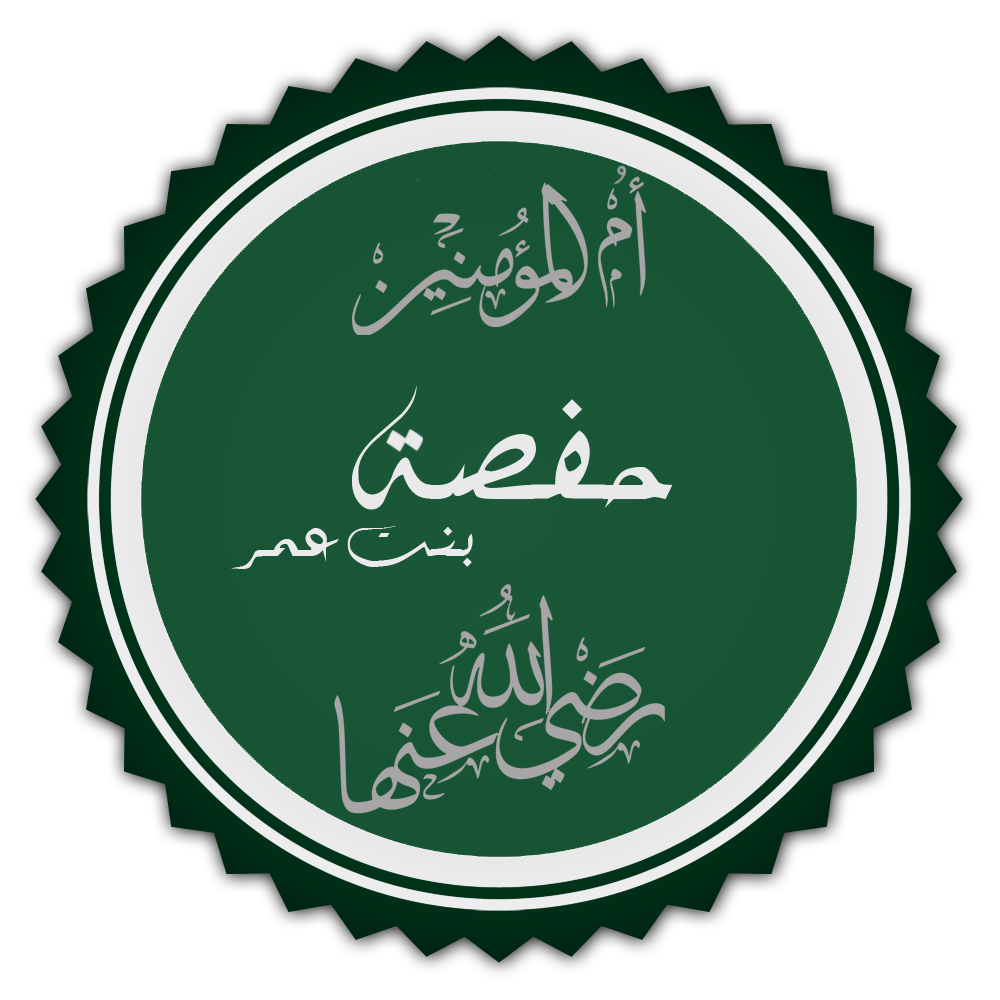
- Pronunciation: Arabic: [ħaːfsˤa]
- Gender: female

Origin
- Origin: Arabic
- Meaning: Young lioness

Other names
- Related names: Hafza, Hafiza

Hafsa or Hafsah (Arabic: حفصة (often confused with Hafza and Hafiza, but all three of them are different names) is an Arabic female given name. It originated from Hafsa, the fourth wife of the Islamic prophet Muhammad and daughter of second Muslim caliph Umar. It is a popular name among Sunni Muslims.

Notable people with the name include:

- Hafsat Abiola (born 1974), Nigerian human rights, civil rights and democracy activist
- Hafsa Ahmed, academic and community worker in New Zealand
- Hafsa Bekri (Hafsa Bekri-Lamrani), Iraqi-Moroccan poet
- Hafsa Bint al-Hajj al-Rukuniyya (died 1190/91), Andalusian poet
- Hafsa bint Umar, daughter of Umar ibn al-Khattab and wife of Muhammad
- Hafsa Sultan (died 1534), Ottoman Sultan Selim I's consort and the mother of Süleyman the Magnificent
- Hafsa Sultan (died 1538), Ottoman Sultan Selim I's daughter
- Hafsa Hatun, Ottoman Sultan Bayezid I's consort
- Hafsa Şeyda Burucu (born 1991), Turkish karate champion
- Hafsa Bint Sirin (651–719), female scholar of Islam and sister of Muhammad ibn Sirin
