= Anti-Sunnism =

Prejudice towards Sunni Muslims

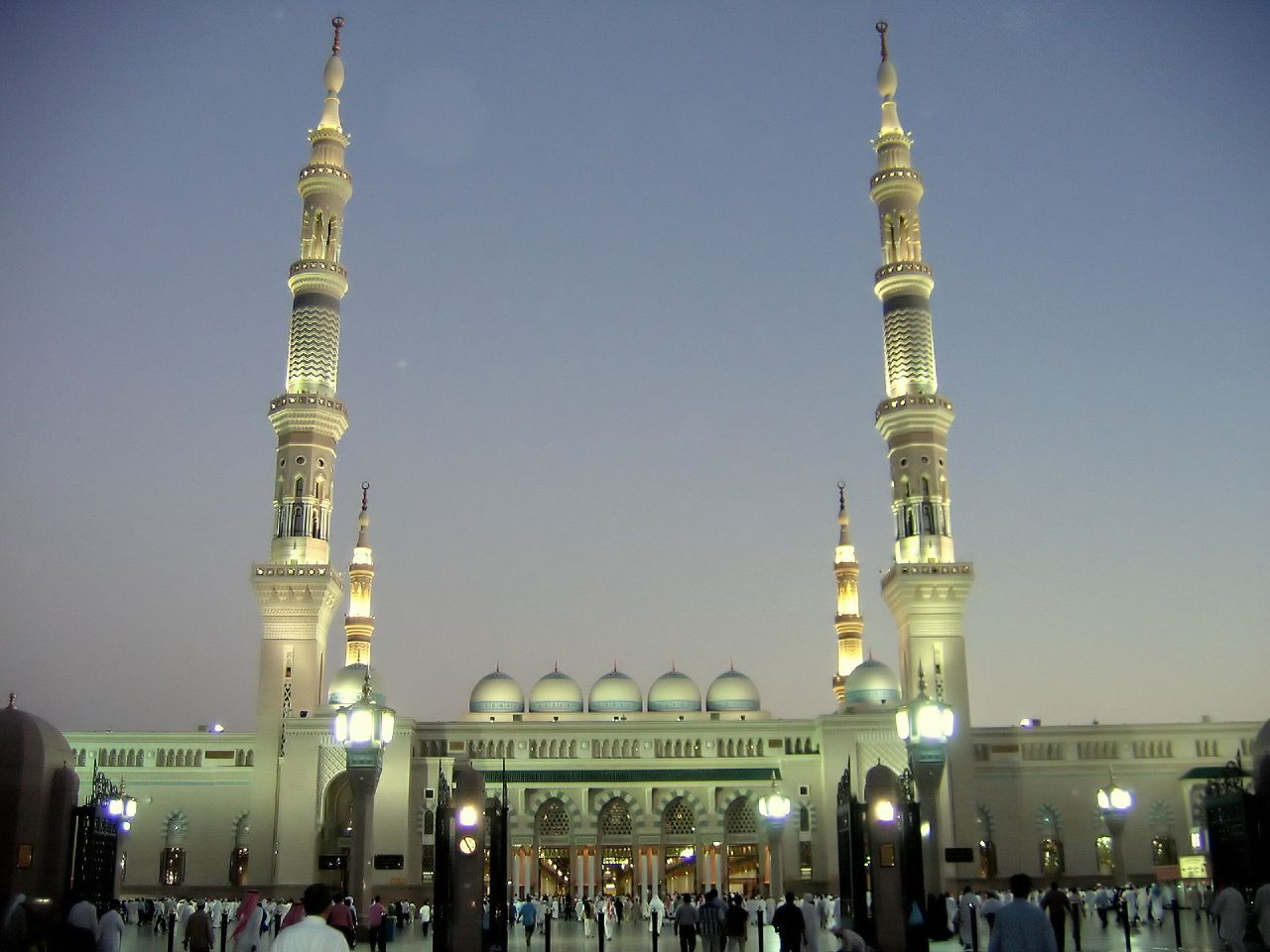
Al-Masjid an-Nabawi in Medina, where the Islamic prophet Muhammad and caliphs Abu Bakr and Umar are buried, is one of the holiest Sunni sites.

Anti-Sunnism, also described as Anti-Sunni sentiment, or Sunniphobia; the "fear or hatred of Sunnism and Sunnites" is hatred, prejudice, discrimination, persecution, or violence against Sunni Muslims.

== War on terror rhetoric ==
Muhammad ibn Abdul Wahhab claimed to be a Sunni Muslim reformer of 18th century Arabia. The religious clergy of the Ottoman Empire considered him and his supporters to be heretics and apostates. They were labelled with the term Wahhabi. During the 19th century, the British colonial government in India placed anti-colonial Sunni scholars on trial in what became known as the "Great Wahhabi Trials" to suppress an imagined "Wahhabi conspiracy".

To be a Wahhabi is officially a crime in Russia. In Russian-aligned Central Asian dictatorships, the term "Wahhabi" is used to refer to any unsanctioned religious activity. As a result, any Sunni Muslim, whether modernist, conservative, political or apolitical, is a potential target.

In response to 9/11 World Trade Centre Bombings, the United States and its allies launched a controversial policy of an unprecedented counter-terrorism effort on an international scale dubbed as the war on terror. It was characterised by the infamous words "You are either with us or against us". Both this approach, as well as the purpose of a war on terror has been questioned. It has also been accused of inciting various forms of Islamophobia on a global scale.

The "war on terror" rhetoric has been adopted by other authoritarian regimes. Russia has frequently invoked the "Wahhabi" label to target Sunni Muslims. Russia has employed its own "war on terror" in the Second Chechen War, in the insurgency in the North Caucasus, and since then in the Russian intervention in the Syrian Civil War.

In a sectarian twist, war on terror rhetoric has also been weaponised by Shiite rulers of Iran who adhere to Khomeinism, even frequently cooperating with the US. Iranian officials commonly invoke the "Wahhabi" label to further its sectarian identity politics in the region. Even prior to the war on terror, Iranian leaders like Ayatollah Khomeini and Rafsanjani had invoked the Wahhabi label describing Sunnis as "heretics" to stir up Sunniphobia and Iran's policy of exporting its Khomeinist revolutions. The curriculum of Khomeinist seminaries in Iran are known for their sectarian depictions against Sunni Muslims, often portraying Sunnis and revered figures in Sunni history as "Wahhabis".

Omair Anas argues that after the war on terror, an imagined Wahhabi conspiracy replaced the United States as Iran's "Great Satan". In this vein, Qassem Soleimani, the former chief of Iran's IRGC, said that Wahhabism had Jewish roots. Hassan Nasrallah, the Secretary General of Hezbollah labelled "Wahhabism" as "more evil than Israel". In 2016, Iranian Foreign Minister Javad Zarif wrote an article in The New York Times entitled "Let Us Rid the World of Wahhabism", wherein he described Wahhabism as a "theological perversion" and "a death cult" that has "wrought havoc", and argued that "virtually every terrorist group abusing the name of Islam" was inspired by Wahhabism.

== Historic persecution ==
=== Safavid period ===
In response to the growth of the Sunni Islam, the Safavid dynasty killed many Sunnis, attempted to convert them to Shi'ism, many of the burials of the Sunni saints were burnt by the orders of Safavid shahs, the Sunni states were also occupied. They also cursed the first three caliphs of Sunni Muslims, and also Aisha and Hafsa, the daughters of first two caliphs and the wives of the Islamic prophet.

Ismail I made new laws for Iran and the lands he controlled:

- Imposing Shiism as the state and mandatory religion for the whole nation and much forcible conversion of Iranian Sufi Sunnis to Shiism.
- He reintroduced the sadr (Arabic, leader) – an office that was responsible for supervising religious institutions and endowments. With a view to transforming Iran into a Shiite state, the sadr was also assigned the task of disseminating Twelver doctrine.
- He destroyed Sunni mosques and massacred many Sunni civilians in Iran and Iraq. This was even noted by Tomé Pires, the Portuguese ambassador to China who visited Iran in 1511–12, who when referring to Ismail noted: "He (i.e. Ismail) reforms our churches, destroys the houses of all Moors who follow (the Sunnah of) Muhammad..."
- He enforced the ritual and compulsory cursing of the first three Sunni caliphs (Abu Bakr, Umar, and Uthman) as usurpers, from all mosques, disbanded Sunni Tariqahs and seized their assets, used state patronage to develop Shia shrines, institutions and religious art and imported Shia scholars to replace Sunni scholars.
- He killed Sunnis and destroyed and desecrated their graves and mosques. This caused the Ottoman Sultan Bayezid II (who initially congratulated Ismail on his victories) to advise and ask the young monarch (in a "fatherly" manner) to stop the anti-Sunni actions. However, Ismail was strongly anti-Sunni, ignored the Sultan's warning, and continued to spread the Shia faith by the sword.
- He persecuted, imprisoned, exiled, and executed stubbornly resistant Sunnis. When they resisted, he mostly did not have them killed outright, but had them arrested and violently forced their families to accept Shi'a Islam in front of their eyes, and in the end, whether they did it or not, they were killed and beheaded anyway and theirs heads placed in the gates for display.
- With the establishment of Safavid rule, there was a very raucous and colourful, almost carnival-like holiday on 26 Dhu al-Hijjah (or alternatively, 9 Rabi' al-awwal) celebrating the assassination of Caliph Omer. The highlight of the day was making an effigy of Umar to be cursed, insulted, and finally burned. However, as relations between Iran and Sunni countries improved, the holiday was no longer observed (at least officially).
- In 1501, Ismail invited all the Shia living outside Iran to come to Iran and be assured of protection from the Sunni majority.

== Modern times ==
=== Iraq ===
The post-Saddam government installed after the 2003 invasion of Iraq has been responsible for systematic discrimination of Sunni Muslims in bureaucracy, politics, military, police, as well as allegedly massacring Sunni Muslim prisoners in a sectarian manner. The De-Ba'athification policy implemented after the toppling of the Baathist regime has mostly been targeting Sunni civil servants, politicians and military officials; leading to anti-Sunni discrimination in the bureaucracy and worsening of the sectarian situation in Iraq. Many Sunnis were killed following the 2006 al-Askari mosque bombing during the Iraqi civil war.

International organizations like the Human Rights Watch have condemned Iraqi government and Iran-backed militant groups of committing sectarian massacres against the Sunni minority in Iraq, stating that these atrocities constituted "crimes against humanity".

==== Barwana massacre ====
The massacre was allegedly committed by Shia militants, as a revenge for ISIS atrocities, in the Sunni village of Barwana, allegedly killing 70 boys and men.

==== Hay al Jihad massacre ====
On 9 July 2006, in the Hay al-Jihad area of Baghdad, the capital of Iraq, an estimated 40 Sunni civilians were killed in revenge attacks carried out by Shia militants from the Mahdi Army.

==== Musab bin Umair mosque massacre ====
On 22 August 2014, Shia militants killed at least 73 people in an attack on the Sunni Mus`ab ibn `Umair mosque in the Imam Wais village of Iraq, the attack occurred during the Friday prayers, where many of the Sunnis were attending their prayers. At the time of the attack, there were about 150 worshippers at the mosque. The Iran-backed Asaib Ahl al-Haq militant group, a splinter group of the Imam Ali Brigades, are suspected to be the perpetrators.

=== Iran ===
Since the 1979 Iranian Revolution, Sunnis in Iran have been systematically discriminated through sectarian policies and treated as second-class citizens by the Iranian government. Sunni-majority provinces in Iran are neglected by the regime, leading to socio-economic disenfranchisement and high rates of poverty. Khomeini had held anti-Sunni religious views, which was also reflected in the geo-political strategy he outlined in his "Last Will and Testament". During the events of 1979 Revolution, Sunni-majority cities in Khuzestan, Western Azerbaijan and Golestan provinces were targets of sectarian attacks by Khomeinist militants. Many Sunni religious leaders and intellectuals who had initially backed the revolution were imprisoned during the 1980s.

Political discriminations have since been normalized, with Sunnis being denied representation in government bodies such as the Guardian Council and the Expediency Council which are reserved for the Shias. It has also been argued that Sunnis are marginalized by the Iranian Majlis, with less than 6% of the seats being permitted for Sunnis since the establishment of the parliamentary body in 1980; the percentage of Sunnis in Iran is usually estimated to be 5-10%, but some Sunni leaders have claimed it to be "between 12 and 25 percent".

After Khomeini's death in 1989, Iran began publicly exporting Anti-Sunni rhetoric through propaganda and Khomeinist media outlets across the Islamic World, in increasing proportions particularly since the 2000s. Sunnis in Iran are also subject to systematic discrimination by the government. Ethnic minorities that are predominantly Sunni, such as the Kurds, Balochs, and Turkmens suffer the brunt of religious persecutions and numerous Masajid (mosques) of these communities are routinely destroyed by the regime's police and paramilitary forces. In spite of the presence of 10 million Sunni inhabitants in Tehran, the regime has also banned the presence of Sunni mosques in the city, leading to widespread discontent. Many Sunni clerics have been assassinated by deathsquads affiliated with the Iranian regime.

In 2007, government tightened restrictions on Sunni religious schools and universities; and forced Sunni religious students to study in Khomeinist institutes. In 2011, Iran imposed restrictions that blocked Sunni Muslims from holding their own separate Eid prayers at the city of Tehran. Discrimination against Sunnis had increased since 2021, due to authoritarian policies of hardline Former President Ibrahim Raisi.

In a brutal massacre known as "Bloody Friday" conducted in September 2022, IRGC and Basij forces opened fired and killed over 90 Sunni protesters during Jumu'ah prayers near Jameh Mosque of Makki in Sistan-Balochistan, the largest Sunni mosque in Iran. Some worshippers had gone out of the mosque and marched on the police station across the street in protest against the recent alleged rape of a Baloch girl by a policeman, throwing stones and molotov cocktails; the security forces responded with fire and continued to shoot at the worshippers as some of them retreated back into the mosque. As of October 2022, the massacre is the deadliest incident that occurred as part of the military crackdown on 2022 Iranian protests. Molwi Abdolhamid Ismaeelzahi, popular Baloch Islamic scholar and spiritual leader of Iran's Sunni Muslim minority, who led the prayers, denounced the regime for the massacre and its "absolute lies" stereotyping the regular Sunni worshippers as Baloch separatists. In an unusual speech condemning Ali Khamenei and Iranian army for the violence and bloodshed, Abdul Hamid declared:

"The supreme leader of the Islamic Republic, as the commander-in-chief of the armed forces, as well as other officials are all responsible, and no one can evade this responsibility.."

In May 2023 alone, Iran executed at least 142 individuals (78, or 55% of them, on drug-related charges), its highest monthly rate since 2015. At least 30 of those executed were from the Sunni Baluch minority.

== See also ==
- Anti-Islamism
- Anti-Shi'ism
- Persecution of Hazara people
- Persecution of minority Muslim groups
- Persecution of Muslims
- Persecution of Sufis
