= Karbala provincial headquarters raid =

2007 military operation

- Part of the Iraq War, Iraqi insurgency, and the Iraqi civil war
Date	January 20, 2007
Location	Provincial Headquarters of Karbala, Iraq
Result	Tactical Asa'ib Ahl al-Haq victory: U.S. base successfully infiltrated by the Khazali Special Groups Network cell led by Azhar Al Dulaimi's special cell; Two U.S. officers (in addition to other military personnel) taken prisoner, later murdered

Belligerents
United States	Asa'ib Ahl al-Haq

Commanders and leaders
(United States) Brian Freeman † (United States) Jacob Fritz †	Azhar al-Dulaimi

Strength
Nearly 60 U.S. soldiers Unknown number of Iraqi police and military personnel	9–12 commandos

Casualties and losses
5 killed (including 4 captured and executed); 3 wounded	None

The Karbala provincial headquarters raid was a special operation carried out on January 20, 2007, by the Asa'ib Ahl al-Haq against the U.S. contingent of the Joint Security Station, located within the Iraqi Police headquarters. The assault, which left five U.S. soldiers dead and three wounded, has been called the "boldest and most sophisticated attack in four years of warfare" and is furthermore notable for being one of the few instances when any sort of militants or insurgents have actually managed to capture U.S. soldiers since the Vietnam War.

== Background ==
Since the 2003 US invasion of Iraq, Karbala province had not seen the same intensity of violence that had wracked other areas of Iraq such as Baghdad and Al Anbar province. Although Karbala had been the site of many attacks, it had largely been free of the spectacular bombings that regularly took place in Baghdad or the heavy urban warfare seen in Fallujah, Mosul, Baqubah, Ramadi, and elsewhere. There were two notable exceptions: the March 2004 Ashura massacre and the uprising of Muqtada al-Sadr's Mahdi Army across southern Iraq the following month. Prior to the 20 January raid, only 33 Coalition soldiers had been killed in Karbala province, constituting just over 1% of total coalition fatalities in Iraq.

== The raid ==
The attack was perpetrated by "nine to 12 militants posing as an American security team ... [who] traveled in black GMC Suburban vehicles—the type used by U.S. government convoys—had American weapons, wore new U.S. military combat fatigues, and spoke English." According to one Iraqi official, the militant team was led by a blond-haired man. The attack occurred as the U.S. military continued preparations to leave. About 30 U.S. troops were inside the compound at the time.

After being waved through the last of three checkpoints defended by Iraqi security forces at around 17:45, the militants parked their (at least) five SUVs near the city's Provisional Joint Coordination Center (PJCC) main building. The attackers' convoy divided upon arrival, with some vehicles parking at the back of the main building others parking in front. The commandos first used homemade explosive to burn the two security vehicles outside. Then they entered the building using fragmentation grenades in an attempt to isolate the two officers. They then stormed into a room the Americans used as a barracks room, attacking with grenades and small arms fire. Once the soldiers in the room were isolated they proceeded to capture two U.S. soldiers, 1LT Jacob Noal Fritz and CPT Brian Scott Freeman. They pulled two more soldiers, PFC Shawn Patrick Falter and SPC Jonathan Bryan Chism out of an armored humvee, at the entrance. One soldier, PVT Jonathon Miles Millican, died by jumping on a grenade, which allowed the other three to only be wounded when the grenade thrown by insurgents exploded in the barracks room on the first floor of the building. Three U.S. humvees were damaged by separate explosions in the raid. No Iraqi policemen or soldiers were injured in the raid, as the insurgents specifically targeted the U.S. soldiers in the compound.

At approximately 18:00, the insurgents broke off the attack and left the compound with their prisoners, heading east toward neighbouring Babil province. Shortly after crossing the Euphrates River, the militants, who were then being followed by U.S. attack helicopters, shot their four captives and abandoned five vehicles along with uniforms, equipment, and a rifle. Three soldiers were found later by Iraqi police with gunshot wounds to their chests near Bu-Alwan, a village close to Mahawil. Three were already dead (two handcuffed together in the back of one of the SUVs and the other on the ground) and the fourth showed up at a nearby hospital with a gunshot wound to the head. On the day of the attack, the U.S. military reported only that five soldiers were killed while "repelling the attack." The full details of the attack, including the militants' penetration of the PJCC compound and the capture of four of the five soldiers, were not released until a week later.

== Aftermath and analysis ==
Four individuals suspected of participating in the raid were detained on January 22 by U.S. troops and Iraqi security forces.

The alleged mastermind behind the attack, Azhar al-Dulaimi, was killed on May 19, 2007, by U.S. forces during a raid north of Baghdad.

=== Evidence of Iranian involvement ===
According to two unnamed U.S. officials, the Pentagon is examining the possibility that the raid was supported or conducted by Iranians. In a speech on January 31, 2007, Iraqi Prime Minister Nouri al-Maliki stated that Iran was supporting attacks against Coalition forces in Iraq and some Iraqis suspect that the raid may have been perpetrated by the Islamic Revolutionary Guard Corps's Qods Force in retaliation for the U.S. raid on the Iranian Liaison Office in Erbil on 11 January.

In response to such speculations, Hassan Kazemi Qomi, the Iranian ambassador to Iraq, "ridiculed evidence the U.S. military claimed to have proving Iranian involvement in planning attacks on U.S. and Iraqi forces."

Journalist Bill Roggio has suggested that the attackers may have intended to transfer the captured Americans over the border to Iran.

This raid required specific intelligence, in depth training for the agents to pass as American troops, resources to provide for weapons, vehicles, uniforms, identification, radios and other items needed to successfully carry out the mission. Hezbollah's Imad Mugniyah executed a similar attack against Israeli forces on the Lebanese border, which initiated the Hezbollah-Israeli war during the summer of 2006…

Mahawil (where abandoned vehicles & the victim's bodies were found) is in Babil Governorate, about 27 miles directly east of Karbala. While it is impossible to prove, the attackers may have been making a bee-line towards the Iranian border.

The Karbala raid makes sense in light of the U.S. raids on the Iranian diplomatic missions in Baghdad and Irbil, where Iranian Qods Force agents were captured, along with documentation that divulged Iran's involvement with and support of Shia death squads and al-Qaeda in Iraq. Five Iranians from the Irbil raid are still in U.S. custody, and captured U.S. soldiers would provide for excellent bargaining chips.

IF [sic] it is confirmed that Iran's Qods Force was responsible, the news that the United States has authorized the death or captured [sic] of Iranian agents inside Iraq, as well as in Afghanistan and Lebanon makes all the more sense.

On July 2, 2007, the U.S. military said that information from captured Hezbollah fighter Ali Musa Daqduq established a link between Quds Force and the Karbala raid. Daqduq worked as a liaison between Quds force and the Shia group that carried out the raid. According to the United States, Daqduq said that the Shia group "could not have conducted this complex operation without the support and direction of the Quds force."

On June 9, 2007, Bill Roggio of the Long War Journal wrote that U.S. Government had discovered satellite imagery showing an exact mockup of the Karbala Provincial Joint Coordination Center compound inside of Iran. It is believed that the Iranian Quds Force used this mockup to train the perpetrators of the attack and is further evidence of direct Iranian involvement.

=== Other incidents ===
20 January 2007 was the third-deadliest day of the Iraq War for U.S. troops, with 20 U.S. soldiers killed throughout Iraq, including 12 in a helicopter crash caused by hostile ground fire northeast of Baghdad in Diyala Governorate. Also that same day, 2 U.S. soldiers and 1 Marine were killed in separate incidents in Iraq.

== See also ==
- Operation Greif
- Ahmed Kousay Altaie – A U.S. Army soldier who was captured by Iraqi insurgents and executed
- Wassef Ali Hassoun – A U.S. Marine who claimed to be captured by Iraqi insurgents; later discovered to be a hoax
- American POWs in the 2003 invasion of Iraq
- 2004 Iraq KBR convoy ambush – Capture and execution of Keith Matthew Maupin, a U.S. Army soldier
- June 2006 abduction of U.S. soldiers in Iraq – Capture and execution of Kristian Menchaca and Thomas L. Tucker, two U.S. Army soldiers
- May 2007 abduction of U.S. soldiers in Iraq – Capture and execution of Alex Ramon Jimenez, Joseph John Anzack and Byron Wayne Fouty, three U.S. Army soldiers
- Joint Special Operations Command Task Force in the Iraq War
