= Scorpions (Iraq) =

Former Iraqi paramilitary

Scorpions was an Iraqi paramilitary force set up by the United States Central Intelligence Agency prior to the 2003 invasion of Iraq.

== History ==
The covert members were trained in Jordan in target identification, explosives and small arms at two secret bases. Weapons and equipment (including old Soviet Mi-24 Hind helicopters) were supplied by the CIA. Most members were recruited from the Iraqi exile community by Iraqi Kurds.

The original mission of the Scorpions was to foment rebellion in Iraq prior to the US-led invasion. However, due to training delays, little of this mission was ever achieved. Following the war, the CIA began using the Scorpions in anti-insurgency roles, and for interrogations of prisoners.

The Scorpions have been implicated in the events that led to the death of Iraqi Maj. Gen. Abed Hamed Mowhoush while in US captivity. These events included the use of physical and psychological torture under the auspices of a CIA operative and Special Forces retiree identified only as "Brian".

The Scorpions' original mission to start - or give the appearance of - a rebellion against the regime of Saddam Hussein's Ba'ath Party, makes their involvement in the death of Mowoush significant. It is not clear at what point the Scorpions became involved in the interrogation of US-held prisoners, other than Mowhoush's interrogation by the Scorpions on November 24, 2003.

== See also ==
- Use of torture since 1948
- Human Rights Record of the United States
