= Saraya al-Salam =

Shia militia in Iraq

- Heraldic dove, symbol of insignia used by Saraya al-Salam.
- Founding leader: Muqtada al-Sadr
- Founded: 2014
- Dates active: 2014–2021 (as a Popular Mobilization Forces branch) 2021–2022 (as a semi-governmental political initiative) 2022–today (as a suspended de facto political group)
- Country: Iraq (Ba'athist Syria) Syria (until 2024)
- Allegiance: Iraq
- Ideology: Shia Islamism; Iraqi nationalism Sadrism
- Size: 10,000–50,000 (2014, independent claims)
- Part of: Popular Mobilization Forces (2014–2022); Sadrist Movement

Saraya al-Salam (Arabic: سرايا السلام) is a Shia Iraqi militia formed in 2014. They were part of the Popular Mobilization Forces and were a partial revival of the Mahdi Army. The name Saraya al-Salam means "Peace Companies", to signify this the militia also uses a dove as a heraldic symbol. The group's name, together with its logo – which features a dove flying in front of an Iraqi flag – reflects Sadr's effort to maintain a peace with both Sunnis and the Iraqi central government. As of 2023, the group's operations are frozen, although it is still active but in smaller scale.

== History ==
Muqtada al-Sadr was the son of an anti-Saddam activist named Muhammad-Sadiq al-Sadr.

The younger al-Sadr, whose newspaper al-Hawza was shut down by the Coalition Provisional Authority, founded a militia called the Mahdi Army, which received support from both Sunni and Shia elements of Iraqi society, uniting them against the coalition forces during the First Battle of Fallujah and Siege of Sadr City, the slogans and banners carrying propaganda in support of Sadr and Mahdi Army were present in both occasions.

After the Siege of Sadr City, Muqtada and his supporters, the Sadrists, went into silence except for a resurgence under different group names such as the Special Groups which did had Sadrist influence however, they were loyal to the Iraqi government eventually with considerable Iranian-influence rather than an independent ideology.

Sadr reformed his militia forces in 2014, to protect Shia shrines from the Islamic State. This new militia was almost entirely formed from the Mahdi Army remnants. According to Faleh A. Jabar and Renad Mansour, the Sadrists have largely been cut off from Iranian funding.

In June 2014, these Peace Companies marched in Sadr City, a slum in Baghdad infamous for being the prime Mahdi Army center of operations during the Iraq War. In addition to guarding shrines, the Peace Companies participated in offensive operations such as the recapture of Jurf Al Nasr in October 2014. They suspended their activities temporarily in February 2015, but were active in the Second Battle of Tikrit in March.

The Peace Brigades announced that they were able to liberate large areas of Jurf al-Sakhar and later announced the handover of all these liberated areas to the security forces. The Peace Brigades were frozen by Muqtada al-Sadr until further notice in a statement he issued on February 17, 2015, and al-Sadr announced on 8 March 2015, with a statement published by his office about lifting the freeze and involving Saraya al-Salam fighters in the Mosul operations

After that statement, the brigade fighters also captured large areas on Samarra and Al-Ishaqi Island in Saladin Governorate and were responsible for liberating what remained of them.

Jurf al-Sakhar is a district about 60 km southwest of Baghdad. It forms a border triangle between northern Babylon, eastern Anbar, and southern Baghdad. It is located on the Euphrates River and is characterized by its vast agricultural lands. It was controlled by ISIS, and its members used to launch from it to carry out terrorist operations in Karbala and Babylon. The Peace Brigades intervened directly in Jurf al Sakhar. On October 15, 2014, Saraya Al-Salam forces were able to liberate the entire Lakes region and hand it over to the security forces.

Amerli is a district of Tuz Khurmatu district with a Shiite Turkmen majority. On June 10, 2014, ISIS imposed a siege on the city after the fall of Mosul. During the siege period, they cut off water and prevented food and medicine from entering the city for 80 days. The people of the city resisted the siege, prevented ISIS from invading their city, and were able to repel its repeated attacks. On August 23, 2014, Al-Sadr's office published a statement by the leader of the Sadrist movement, Muqtada Al-Sadr, in which he called on the Peace Brigades to coordinate with the security forces to end the siege on Amirli. Indeed, large forces arrived at the outskirts of the city and began preparing for a large operation to lift the siege. The Peace Brigades launched operations, "We are coming, Amirli." On August 31, joint forces from the Iraqi army, the Popular Mobilization Units, and the Peace Brigades succeeded in breaking the siege on the city of Amerli and entered the city from several axes, while the Peace Brigades announced after Three days enabled it to liberate the village of Albu Hassan on the outskirts of the city of Amirli

After ISIS took control of the entire island of Samarra, which is located west of the city of Samarra, which is considered a holy city for Shiites and is a link between the governorates of Salah al-Din, Anbar, and Nineveh. It extends over vast areas that include different and varied terrain and has become a safe haven for Al-Qaeda militants and later ISIS militants.

On March 1, 2016, the Peace Brigades announced the launch of major joint operations collaborating with the Iraqi Army, the Federal Police, and fighters of the Peace Brigades and the Popular Mobilization Forces to liberate this island. The battle continued for three days, during which the joint forces were able to reach Lake Tharthar after the forces launched from the area, with a liberated area of approximately 42 kilometers.

After defeat of ISIS, prime minister Adel Abdul Mahdi issued a decision to organize the Popular Mobilization Forces with army and police formations and confine weapons to the state. As the result Sadr has closed the militia's majority of operations in 2021, however it still operates as a "lesson in politics".

In 2022, the Shia groups rebelled and fought against each other after Sadr declared he will resign from politics and as Iran was suspected to have influence over the Shia populace armed groups broke alliance in de facto in terms of power struggle.

There was an argument that a new "Shia internal conflict" could start as a result of Mohammed Shia' Al Sudani's decisions on reforming the Popular Mobilization Forces and reduce Iran-centred power struggle in Iraq. There was also a report of Saraya Al-Salam supporters in 2023 entering into a minor skirmish with Asa'ib Ahl al-Haq, another Shia militia in the Iraq. In similar manner, Sadr was reported to have called for an action against United States by closing the American Embassy, in context of the War in Gaza, implying a support for Gaza.

As of 2023, it is also reported that Saraya al-Salam had departed from Popular Mobilization Forces, therefore all activities, beside the government sanctioned ones, were independent actions.

== See also ==
- Al Salam 313
- Sadrist Movement
- Badr Organization
- League of the Righteous
- Hezbollah Brigades
- Harakat Hezbollah al-Nujaba
- Kata'ib al-Imam Ali
