= Qais al-Khazali =

Pro-Iran Iraqi insurgent (born 1974)

Sheikh Qais al-Khazali
- قيس الخزعلي
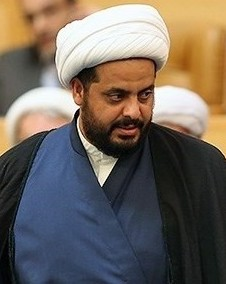
- Al-Khazali in 2017

Secretary-General of Asa'ib Ahl al-Haq
- Incumbent
- Assumed office July 2006

Member of Coordination Framework
- Incumbent
- Assumed office March 2021

Personal details
- Born: 20 June 1974 (age 52) Sadr City, Ba'athist Iraq
- Party: Asa'ib Ahl al-Haq
- Other political affiliations: Coordination Framework; Fatah Alliance (until 2025); Sadrist Movement (until 2006)

Military service
- Allegiance: Iraq
- Branch/service: Popular Mobilization Forces (until 2020); Islamic Resistance in Iraq (since 2020)
- Years of service: 2003–present
- Rank: Commander
- Unit: Asa'ib Ahl al-Haq; Mahdi Army (2003–2006)
- Battles/wars: Iraq War (POW); Iraqi insurgency (2003–2011); Syrian civil war War in Iraq (2013–2017)

Qais Hadi Sayed Hasan al-Khazali (Arabic: قيس هادي سيد حسن الخزعلي; born 20 June 1974) is an Iraqi politician and militant leader who is the founder and secretary-general of the Asa'ib Ahl al-Haq, an Iraqi Shia paramilitary organization and political party designated as a terrorist organization by US Treasury. He is best known as the founder and leader of the Iran-backed Special Groups in Iraq from June 2006 until his capture by British forces in March 2007. He is among the most powerful openly anti-American politicians in Iraq and his influence in Iraqi politics has significantly grown in recent years.

As head of the Special Groups, Khazali directed arms shipment, formation of squads to participate in fighting, and insurgent operations, most notably the 20 January 2007 attack on American forces in Karbala. A former follower of Muqtada al-Sadr, he was expelled from the Mahdi Army in 2004 for giving "unauthorized orders" and founded his own group: Asa'ib Ahl al-Haq (AAH) also known as the "Khazali Network" that was later designated as a terrorist group by the U.S. Department of State. During his incarceration, Akram al-Kaabi became acting commander of the organization until his release in January 2010.

== Early life ==
Qais bin Hadi bin Sayyid bin Hassan Al Abd al-Aal al-Harishawi al-Khazali was born on June 20, 1974 (corresponding to 30 Jumada al-Awwal 1394 AH) in Sadr City, Baghdad. He grew up in Baghdad, where he completed his primary and secondary education. He later attended the University of Baghdad, studying in the Geology Department of the Faculty of Science.

=== Entry into Seminary Studies ===
In 1994, while engaged in an academic discussion with a university classmate regarding the theological and astronomical reasons behind Shia Muslims delaying the Maghrib prayer by approximately 12 minutes after the call to prayer, al-Khazali authored an academic research paper on the subject. To present his findings to religious scholars and authorities, he traveled to the city of Najaf. Following this pivotal visit, he chose to transition into religious studies, enrolling in the Imam al-Mahdi Seminary in Najaf to study Islamic jurisprudence.

During the religious and social movement led by Muhammad Muhammad Sadiq al-Sadr, al-Khazali assumed several prominent administrative and institutional responsibilities within the Najaf seminary. He was appointed as the deputy to the general supervisor of the seminary schools in Najaf. Additionally, he served as a member of the Sharia Rights (Religious Dues) Department in the office of Ayatollah al-Sadr, working alongside figures such as Sultan Kalantar, Muqtada al-Sadr, and Mustafa al-Yacoubi.

== Military career ==
=== Role in the post-2003 insurgency and the Sadrist Movement ===
Following the U.S.-led invasion of Iraq in 2003, Qais al-Khazali emerged as a prominent commander within the Sadrist Movement, aligned with the Shia cleric Muqtada al-Sadr. He was appointed as the official spokesperson for the Mahdi Army, the movement's military wing, which commanded tens of thousands of Shia fighters. Throughout 2004, the Mahdi Army engaged in intense armed clashes with U.S. forces across several Iraqi cities, including Kufa, Najaf, and Amarah. In April 2004, al-Khazali publicly rejected allegations made by Paul Bremer, the head of the Coalition Provisional Authority, who accused the Mahdi Army of stockpiling weapons inside religious holy sites. Dismissing the claims as fabricated, al-Khazali reiterated the group's demand for an immediate withdrawal of all American troops from Iraq. Later that year, on October 3, 2004, acting in his capacity as the spokesperson for the Mahdi Army, al-Khazali announced a curfew imposed by the group's high command in Baghdad, calling on civil servants to strike and abstain from going to work. He also issued a directive urging the Iraqi Police and National Guard to refrain from engaging in combat against the Mahdi Army. This announcement coincided with U.S. F-16 airstrikes targeting the perimeter of Muqtada al-Sadr’s residence in Najaf.

=== Split from the Sadrist Movement and the Founding of Asa'ib Ahl al-Haq ===
Al-Khazali gradually distanced himself from the leadership of Muqtada al-Sadr. Sources differ on the exact catalysts for the rift, pointing to al-Khazali's frustration with al-Sadr's willingness to enter repeated ceasefires with American forces, as well as his critical view of the Mahdi Army's conventional combat capabilities. When later questioned during his detention about reports regarding Mahdi Army fighters deploying to the 2006 Lebanon War, al-Khazali dismissed the claims, suggesting the fighters lacked the capability to survive that level of conventional warfare.

Consequently, al-Khazali prioritized direct collaboration with the Iranian Quds Force and Lebanese Hezbollah, frequently traveling to Iran to coordinate logistics and financial support. By 2006, he had fully broken away from the Sadrist Movement to establish an independent paramilitary organization, Asa'ib Ahl al-Haq (AAH), aimed at maintaining an armed campaign against U.S. forces with Iranian backing.

=== Karbala Provincial Joint Coordination Center raid ===
On January 20, 2007, a highly coordinated paramilitary force from Asa'ib Ahl al-Haq executed a complex raid on a joint U.S.-Iraqi military outpost within the Karbala Provincial Joint Coordination Center. The operation resulted in the abduction and subsequent killing of five U.S. soldiers, making it one of the most high-profile and deadly tactical operations launched against American forces during the war. Intelligence reports later indicated that the Iranian Quds Force provided extensive training and resources for the operation, which included constructing a full-scale replica of the compound for rehearsals. Defense analysts noted that the sophistication, uniforms, and tactical execution of the raid closely mirrored the operational style of Lebanese Hezbollah, contrasting sharply with the less structured tactics previously used by the Mahdi Army.

As the leader of Asa'ib Ahl al-Haq, al-Khazali maintained ultimate command authority and provided the religious and operational justification for the raid. During his subsequent detention and interrogation by coalition forces, he acknowledged that the operation could not have proceeded without his explicit authorization, asserting that it was carried out within his interpretation of Islamic law. Nearly two decades later, during a televised interview in June 2025, al-Khazali reaffirmed his stance on the event, stating that his involvement in organizing the raid remained a point of honor for him.

== Arrest and release ==
On the night of 20 March 2007 the G squadron of the British SAS and US troops raided a house in Basra containing Khazali and arrested him along with his brother Laith and his advisor Ali Musa Daqduq without casualties and gained valuable intelligence.

Khazali was released in January 2010, in exchange for Peter Moore, who had been kidnapped by Asa'ib Ahl al-Haq. In December that year, notorious special groups commanders Abu Deraa and Mustafa al-Sheibani were allowed to return to Iraq and declared they would be working with Khazali after their return. Since his release, al-Khazali has pivoted from attacking U.S.-led Coalition forces in Iraq to recruiting for pro-Assad Shi'ite militias in Syria.

== Political career ==
Following his release from custody in early 2010 and the subsequent withdrawal of U.S. forces from Iraq in 2011, al-Khazali initiated a gradual transition toward conventional politics. In March 2011, he publicly declared his support for the popular protests in Bahrain, which were ultimately suppressed by the Bahraini government. By December 2011, al-Khazali formally announced that Asa'ib Ahl al-Haq (AAH) would enter the Iraqi political process. He characterized the existing political framework as inherently flawed and called for systemic corrections. During the same year, al-Khazali aligned AAH with the incumbent Iraqi Prime Minister, Nouri al-Maliki, in a strategic effort to contain the influence of their shared political rival, Muqtada al-Sadr.

In a speech delivered in August 2012, al-Khazali reframed the ongoing disputes between the Iraqi central government and the Kurdistan Regional Government (KRG) as an underlying Shia-Kurdish conflict. He further asserted that the historic political alliance between Shia and Kurdish politicians was a mere illusion and functionally non-existent.

== Institutional expansion and the Syrian civil war (2013–2014) ==
By 2013, AAH had deepened its political engagement while experiencing significant paramilitary growth. The group's ranks expanded to approximately 10,000 fighters, more than tripling its estimated strength from 2007. Concurrently, reports emerged detailing the involvement of AAH fighters in the Syrian Civil War. In a mid-2014 interview with the Al-Iraqiya television network, al-Khazali downplayed the extent of this involvement. He distanced himself from Damascus, accusing the administration of Bashar al-Assad of complicity in the shedding of Iraqi blood in prior years and expressing ideological opposition to the Syrian government due to its Ba'athist orientation.

== Clashes with ISIS and regional accusations ==
Following the fall of Mosul to the Islamic State (ISIS) in June 2014, al-Khazali publicly blamed remnants of the Ba'ath party and Kurdish leader Masoud Barzani for conspiring in the collapse of the city. In a July 2014 interview with the BBC, al-Khazali expanded his regional criticisms, accusing Qatar of supporting ISIS. During the same interview, he issued a formal apology for the 2007 abduction of British IT consultant Peter Moore and the subsequent execution of his four British security guards. As the international response materialized, al-Khazali strongly opposed the September 2014 intervention of the U.S.-led International Coalition in Iraq, maintaining his stance against foreign military involvement.

=== Paramilitary mobilization and counter-offensives ===
In response to the rapid expansion of ISIS, al-Khazali directed personnel from Asa'ib Ahl al-Haq (AAH) to integrate into the Popular Mobilization Forces (PMF) alongside Iraqi national security elements. Throughout the remainder of 2014, AAH fighters mobilized across central Iraq, participating in key defensive and counter-offensive operations that successfully repelled ISIS advancements in Baqubah, Dhuluiya, Amerli, and Jurf al-Sakhar.

=== Major advances and post-war foreign policy ===
In 2015, AAH shifted its focus toward major offensive operations aimed at reclaiming large territorial centers. The group played a major role in the Second Battle of Tikrit (2015). In March 2015, al-Khazali conducted a highly publicized field visit to the frontlines in military uniform, where he officially announced the liberation of Tikrit. He made a similar command visit to Baiji in June 2015, where his forces participated in securing the city and its strategic oil refinery. Following these military successes, al-Khazali turned his attention to external regional actors. In September 2015, he declared Turkey to be the "biggest enemy of Iraq," accusing Ankara of facilitating the transit of foreign ISIS fighters and exploiting illicit Iraqi oil networks.

== Sanctions ==
On 6 December 2019, the U.S. Treasury Department sanctioned Khazali and placed him on the SDN List for "involvement in serious human rights abuse in Iraq," and addressed his role in the violent repression of Iraqi protests beginning in October 2019. During the protests, AAH militia forces controlled by Khazali, opened fire on and killed peaceful protesters.

On 31 December 2019, U.S. Secretary of State Mike Pompeo named Khazali, along with Abu Mahdi al-Muhandis, Hadi al-Amiri, and Falih Al-Fayyadh, as responsible for the attack on the United States embassy in Baghdad.

On 3 January 2020, U.S. Department of State designated Asa'ib Ahl al-Haq as a foreign terrorist organization (FTO), with Qais al-Khazali and his brother Laith al-Khazali as Specially Designated Global Terrorists (SDGT) under Executive Order 13224.

== Sources ==
- Kagan, Kimberly (2009), The Surge: A Military History, New York, NY: Encounter Books, ISBN 978-1-59403-249-3
