= Asa'ib Ahl al-Haq =

Iraqi Shia paramilitary group

Asa'ib Ahl al-Haq عصائب أهل الحق
- Leader: Qais al-Khazali
- Founded: July 2006
- Ideology: Shia Islamism; Khomeinism; Wilayat al-Faqih; Anti-Sunnism; Muhammad Sadiq al-Sadr Thought; Anti-Zionism; Anti-Americanism; Pan-Islamism; Anti-West; Anti-LGBT; Kazem al-Haeri Thought
- Political position: Right-wing to far-right
- Religion: Shia Islam
- National affiliation: Fatah Alliance (2018–2025); Al-Sadiqoun Bloc (since 2014)
- International affiliation: Axis of Resistance
- Colours: White, Green
- Seats in the Council of Representatives: 27 / 329

Party flag

Asa'ib Ahl al-Haq (AAH)
- Leaders: Qais al-Khazali; Akram al-Kaabi (2007–2010)
- Spokesperson: Naeem al-Aboudi; Jawad al-Talabawi (military)
- Dates active: July 2006 – present
- Split from: Sadrist Movement (Mahdi Army)
- Allegiance: Iran (IRGC); Iraq (2006–present)
- Group: See section
- Headquarters: Sadr City, Baghdad, Iraq
- Active regions: Mainly Baghdad and Southern Iraq; also active in Iraq's central regions
- Size: 10,000
- Part of: Special Groups; Popular Mobilization Forces; Islamic Resistance in Iraq; Private militias in Iraq
- Wars: Iraq War; Iraqi Civil War; Syrian Civil War
- Website: http://ahlualhaq.com

Asa'ib Ahl al-Haq (AAH; Arabic: عصائب أهل الحق Aṣaʾib ʾAhl al-Haqq, "League of the Righteous"), also known as the Khazali Network (Arabic: شبكة الخزعلي), is an Iraqi Shia Islamist political party and paramilitary organization previously active in the Iraqi insurgency and Syrian Civil War. During the Iraq War, it was the largest of the Special Groups (Iraq). It's part of the Popular Mobilization Forces (PMF) in the 41st, 42nd, and 43rd Brigades, cooperating with the Iraqi government in its fight against ISIS.

AAH is funded, trained, equipped and guided by IRGC's Quds Force and Hezbollah's Unit 3800. Members of AAH, as part of PMF, receive Iraqi government salaries after the PMF units were officially integrated into Iraqi security forces in 2018.

AAH has claimed responsibility for over 6,000 attacks on U.S.-led Coalition forces between 2006 and 2011, seeking to drive U.S. forces out of Iraq. The militia's main tactic was to plant IEDs along the roads used by U.S. forces. These lethal roadside bombs killed and wounded hundreds of Coalition troops. Other tactics include sniper attacks, kidnappings, rocket and RPG attacks. Since 2011, AAH has assassinated Iraqi political opponents, killed civilian protesters, and continued attacks on U.S. diplomatic and military presence. In 2017, AAH created a party with the same name.

On 3 January 2020, the U.S. Department of State announced its intent to designate AAH a terrorist organization along with two of its leaders, Qais al-Khazali and his brother Laith al-Khazali, who were named Specially Designated Global Terrorists (SDGT).

On 2 June 2026, Asaib Ahl al-Haq proposed a plan to place their weaponry under Iraqi government control.

== History ==
Asa'ib Ahl al-Haq split from the Sadrist Movement in 2004. Qais al-Khazali split from Muqtada al-Sadr's Mahdi Army after the Shi'a uprising in 2004 to create his own Khazali network. When the Mahdi Army signed a ceasefire with the government and the Americans and the fighting stopped, Khazali continued fighting, and during the battle Khazali was already issuing his own orders to militiamen without Muqtada al-Sadr's approval. The group's leadership (which includes Khazali, Abd al-Hadi al-Darraji (a politician in Muqtada al-Sadr's Sadr Movement) and Akram al-Kaabi), however, reconciled with al-Sadr in mid-2005. In July 2006, Asa'ib Ahl al-Haq was founded and became one of the Special Groups which operated more independently from the rest of the Mahdi Army.

Jaber Rajabi has been described by The Jerusalem Post and Al Arabiya as a founding member of Asa'ib Ahl al-Haq and Harakat Hezbollah al-Nujaba.

AAH became a completely independent organisation after the Mahdi Army's disbanding after the 2008 Shi'a uprising. In July 2006, A part of AAH fought alongside Hezbollah in 2006 Lebanon War against Israel. In November 2008 when Sadr created the Promised Day Brigade to succeed the Mahdi Army, he asked AAH (and other Special Groups) to join, but they declined.

AAH has claimed responsibility for over 6,000 attacks in Iraq including the October 10, 2006 attack on Camp Falcon, the assassination of the American military commander in Najaf, the May 6, 2006 downing of a British Lynx helicopter and the October 3, 2007 attack on the Polish ambassador. Their most known attack, however, is the January 20, 2007 Karbala provincial headquarters raid where they infiltrated the U.S. Army's offices at Karbala, killed one soldier, then abducted and killed four more American soldiers. In 2025, Michael Knights of the Washington Institute reported that Qais al-Khazali had defended his role in the raid in a television interview and cited U.S. military interrogation transcripts stating that Khazali authorized Adnan Fayhan to launch the attack. After the raid, the U.S. military launched a crackdown on AAH and the raid's mastermind Azhar al-Dulaimi was killed in Baghdad, while much of the group's leadership captured including the brothers Qais and Laith al-Khazali and Lebanese Hezbollah member Ali Musa Daqduq who was Khazali's advisor was in charge of their relations with Hezbollah. After these arrests in 2007, Akram al-Kaabi, who had been the military commander of the Mahdi Army until May 2007, led the organisation. In May 2007, AAH kidnapped British IT expert Peter Moore and his four bodyguards. They demanded the release of all their fighters being imprisoned by the Iraqi authorities and US military in return for his release. His four bodyguards were killed, but Moore himself was released when AAH's leader Qais al-Khazali was released in January 2010. Prior to Khazali's release, security forces had already released over 100 of the group's members including Laith al-Khazali. In 2008 many of the group's fighters and leaders fled to Iran after the Iraqi Army was allowed to re-take control of Sadr City and the Mahdi Army was disbanded. Here most fighters were re-trained in new tactics. It resulted in a major lull in the group's activity from May to July 2008.

In February 2010, AAH kidnapped DoD civilian Issa T. Salomi, a naturalized American from Iraq. This was the first high-profile kidnapping of a foreigner in Iraq since the kidnapping of Peter Moore (which was also done by AAH). Salomi was released in March 2010 in exchange for four AAH militants being held in Iraqi custody. In total 450 members of AAH have been handed over from US to Iraqi custody since the kidnapping of Peter Moore, over 250 of which have been released by the Iraqi authorities.

On July 21, 2010, General Ray Odierno said Iran was supporting three Shiite extremist groups in Iraq that had been attempting to attack US bases. One of the groups was AAH and the other two were the Promised Day Brigade and Ketaib Hezbollah.

In December 2010 it was reported that notorious Shi'a militia commanders such as Abu Deraa and Mustafa al-Sheibani were returning from Iran to work with AAH. Iranian Grand Ayatollah Kazem al-Haeri was identified as the group's spiritual leader.

In August and September 2012, AAH started a poster campaign in which they distributed over 20,000 posters of Iran's Supreme Leader Ayatollah Sayyid Ali Khamenei throughout Iraq. A senior official in Baghdad's local government said municipal workers were afraid to take the posters down in fear of retribution by AAH militiamen.

In July 2014, AAH militiamen killed 29 prostitutes in Baghdad's Zayouna neighborhood.

=== Iraq protests, 2018–present ===
In late 2018, protests in Basra, Iraq saw several Iran-related organizations being targeted. Among the damage caused by protesters were several AAH offices which were set on fire.

During protests in Iraq in 2019, AAH combatants reportedly opened fire on demonstrators attempting to set fire to the group's office in Nasiriya, killing at least nine individuals.

On 3 January 2020, the United States Department of State designated AAH a foreign terrorist organization (FTO) along with two of its leaders. Qais al-Khazali and his brother Laith al-Khazali were designated Specially Designated Global Terrorists. The sanctions were imposed in view of the violent suppression of civil protests in Iraq by Asa'ib Ahl al-Haq.

=== Plan to lay down weapons ===
On 2 June 2026, Asa'ib Ahl al-Haq announced a plan to put weaponry under Iraqi governmental control.

== Syrian Civil War ==
AAH's Syrian branch was called the Haidar al-Karar Brigades, and led by Akram al-Kaabi, AAH's military leader was stationed in Aleppo. al-Kaabi is also the founder and leader of the militant group Harakat Hezbollah al-Nujaba.

The group initially fought under the banner of al-Abbas Brigade (a mixed Syrian, Iraqi and Lebanese Shia organization), but split in 2014 following a dispute with al-Abbas's native Syrian fighters. Like other Iraqi Shia paramilitaries in Syria, they fought in defense of the Sayyidah Zainab shrine.

== Iraq elections ==
AAH took part in the 2014 Iraqi parliamentary election as part of the Al-Sadiqoun Bloc. An electoral meeting of an estimated 100,000 supporters of Al-Sadiqoun was marred by violence as a series of bombs exploded at the campaign rally held at the Industrial Stadium in eastern Baghdad, killing at least 37 people and wounding scores of others, according to Iraqi police. The group organizers had planned to announce at the rally the names of its candidates for the parliamentary election. At the election, the Al-Sadiquun Bloc won just one seat out of 328 seats in the Iraqi Parliament.

AAH took part in the 2018 Iraqi parliamentary election as part of the Fatah Alliance.

== Strength ==
AAH's strength was estimated at 3,000 fighters in March 2007. In mid-2008, Multinational Forces-Iraq declined to provide an estimate on the size of AAH, but noted that "their numbers have significantly dwindled because hundreds have been captured, killed, ran away or simply gave up their criminal lifestyles." In July 2011, however, officials estimated there were less than 1,000 AAH militiamen left in Iraq. The group is alleged to receive some $5 million worth of cash and weapons every month from Iran. In January 2012, following the American withdrawal from Iraq in December 2011, Qais al-Khazali declared the United States was defeated and that now the group was prepared to disarm and join the political process.

Since the beginning of the Iraqi war against ISIL, AAH has grown to around 10,000 members and been described as one of if not the most powerful members of the Popular Mobilization Forces. It has recruited hundreds of Sunni fighters to fight against ISIS.

== Funding ==
The group receives funding, training, weapons and guidance from Iran's Revolutionary Guards' Quds Force as well as Iranian-backed Lebanese group Hezbollah. By March 2007, Iran was providing the network between $750,000 and $3 million in arms and financial support each month. Abu Mustafa al-Sheibani, a former Badr Brigades member who ran an important smuggling network known as the Sheibani Network, played a key role in supplying the group. The group was also supplied by a smuggling network headed by Ahmad Sajad al-Gharawi, a former Mahdi Army commander, mostly active in Maysan Governorate.

== Organisational structure ==
As of 2006 AAH had at least four major operational branches:

- The Imam al-Ali Brigade – Responsible for Southern Iraq (Iraq's 9 Shi'a governorates: Babil, al-Basrah, Dhi Qar, al-Karbala, Maysan, al-Muthanna, an Najaf, al-Qadisiyyah and Wasit Governorates)
- The Imam al-Kazem Brigade – Responsible for West-Baghdad (mainly the Shi'a Kadhimiya and Al Rashid districts but also some minor activity in the mixed Karkh district and the mainly Sunni Mansour district)
- The Imam al-Hadi Brigade – Responsible for East-Baghdad (mainly the Shi'a Thawra, Nissan and Karrada districts but with some minor activity in the mixed Rusafa district and the mainly Sunni Adhamiyah district)
- The Iman al-Askari Brigade – Responsible for Central Iraq (mainly active in the Shi'a areas in Southern Diyala, Samarra City (in Salah ad-Din Governorate) and some Shi'a enclaves in Nineveh and Kirkuk Governorates)
- The Haidar al-Karar Brigades – Responsible for Syria, mainly Southern Damascus and West Aleppo.

=== Others ===
- 41st Brigade
- 42nd Brigade Quwat Liwa al-Shaheed al-Qa'id Abu Mousa al-Amiri
- 43rd Brigade

== See also ==
- Iran–Israel proxy conflict
- Alahad TV (channel owned and operated by Asa'ib Ahl al-Haq)
- Belligerents in the Syrian Civil War
- U.S. Department of State list of Foreign Terrorist Organizations
- List of armed groups in the Iraqi Civil War
- Private militias in Iraq
- Holy Shrine Defender
