= Ali Musa Daqduq =

Lebanese militant (1969–2026)

Ali Musa Daqduq علي موسى دقدوق
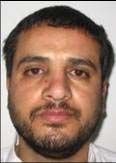
- Born: 1969; Ayta ash-Shab, Lebanon
- Arrested: 20 March 2007; Basra, Iraq
- Released: 16 November 2012; Iraq
- Died: 12 June 2026 (aged 56–57); Lebanon
- Citizenship: Lebanese
- Detained at: Guantanamo Bay camp
- Other names: Ali Mussa Daqduq al-Musawi; Hamid Muhammad Jabur al-Lami; Husayn Muhammad Jabur al-Musui
- Alleged to be a member of: Asa'ib Ahl al-Haq; Hezbollah
- Charges: false identification; 10 U.S.C. § 950t(15), Murder in violation of the law of war; 10 U.S.C. § 950t(13), Intentionally causing serious bodily injury; 10 U.S.C. § 950t(17), Using treachery or perfidy; 10 U.S.C. § 950t(24), Terrorism; 10 U.S.C. § 950t(25), Providing material support for terrorism; 10 U.S.C. § 950t(27), Spying; 10 U.S.C. § 950t(28), Attempted murder in violation of the law of war; 10 U.S.C. § 950t(28), Attempted taking hostages; 10 U.S.C. § 950t(29), Conspiracy

Ali Musa Daqduq (Arabic: علي موسى دقدوق, romanized: ʿAlī Mūsā Daqdūq; 1969 – 12 June 2026) was a Lebanese militant who served as a senior Hezbollah leader and advisor to Asa'ib Ahl al-Haq leader Qais al-Khazali in Iraq.

He commanded Hezbollah's Department 2800 before playing a key role in establishing Iranian-backed Shiite militias in Iraq as part of Unit 3800 following the US invasion of Iraq. He was also responsible for planning the 2007 Karbala provincial headquarters raid, in which five American soldiers were captured and killed during the Iraq War.

== Early life ==
Daqduq was reportedly born in 1969 in Ayta ash-Shaab, a municipality and village in Lebanon's Nabatieh Governorate. Other sources place his birth between 1969 and 1974 in Beirut, Lebanon, or in Karrada, Baghdad, Iraq.

== Early militant career ==
Daqduq joined Hezbollah in 1983 and was soon appointed head of its Department 2800, the group's special operations unit. He soon advanced through the ranks, eventually taking on the role of directing activities across most of Lebanon, and then in the 1990s became responsible for managing Hezbollah leader Hassan Nasrallah's personal security.

In March 2003, following the 2003 invasion of Iraq under US President George W. Bush, Iran discovered US forces on two frontiers (Iraq and Afghanistan). Tehran feared that the Bush administration would seek regime change and that the US or Israel would attack its nuclear facilities. Iran had one tactic at its disposal: it supported a variety of Iraqi insurgents who targeted American forces. Daqduq was sent to Iraq in 2005 to help Hezbollah and the Iranian Quds Force train Iraqi fighters against Western coalition forces in the country, in a move intended to establish a "resistance axis" in Iraq similar to Hezbollah. He oversaw the establishment of several pro-Iranian Iraqi militias, which according to his designation as a Specially Designated Global Terrorist by the U.S. in 2011, were responsible for the killing of more than 600 American soldiers. This included the training of fighters in the Mahdi Army into what became Asa'ib Ahl al-Haq (AAH). According to U.S. Brig. Gen. Kevin J. Bergner, he would train groups of 20–60 Iraqis at three camps near Tehran, where they would be taught how to use explosives and snipers, as well as intelligence and kidnapping operations.

In May 2006, he traveled to Iran alongside senior Hezbollah member Yussef Hashim to organize these groups into a Hezbollah-inspired structure. During this meeting, he was in contact with Quds Force leader Qasem Soleimani and his deputy, Abdolreza Shahlaei. Daqduq went on to make four trips to Iraq that year, monitoring the training and arming of the Iraqi groups. While in Iraq, he served under Hashim, who was the commander of Unit 3800, Hezbollah's division in the country. In June, he became the chief advisor to AAH leader Qais al-Khazali and advised Laith al-Khazali, as well as other members of the organization, serving as a liaison between the Quds Force and the Iraqi militia.

== 2007 capture by the U.S. military ==
Daqduq was captured in a raid by US troops and the G squadron of the British SAS in Basra on 20 March 2007 along with Qais al-Khazali and his brother Laith al-Khazali. During the raid, a 22-page document was seized detailing the planning of several operations, including the 2007 Karbala provincial headquarters raid that killed five U.S. soldiers. The documents revealed that Daqduq was personally involved in military operations, including a plan to abduct a British soldier. Later, in 2012, two Iraqi courts found him not guilty of masterminding the 2007 raid on an American military base and released him from prison. US Intelligence has alleged that Daqduq's testimony during his internment is key evidence for collaboration between Iran and Hezbollah. He is alleged to have been a key facilitator of an IRGC-Quds Force sniper network in Iraq.

On 2 July 2007, US forces identified that they had captured Daqduq. They asserted he was a member of Hezbollah, and was operating with support from Iran. The 2 July press briefing published images of Daqduq's forged identity documents. Iranian officials denied that assertion on 4 July 2007. Daqduq pretended to be deaf and mute when he was captured, and refused to speak for weeks.

In November 2011, Reuters reported that the US was negotiating with the Iraqi government to hold Daqduq in US custody after the US pulled out of Iraq in December 2011. An agreement could not be reached, and Daqduq was transferred to Iraqi custody on 18 December 2011.

=== Release ===
On 7 May 2012, Iraq dismissed terrorism and false documents charges against Daqduq. The case was automatically appealed, and he remained imprisoned until the appeal was heard in the superior court. The United States opposed his release, believing that there was clear evidence against him and that he was likely to commit more acts of resistance against US forces if released. Officials in the military commissions system in the United States began procedures to charge Daqduq with war crimes (specifically, that he killed or ordered killed four US soldiers captured during a raid).

On 16 November 2012, Daqduq was released from Iraqi custody as the Iraqi government determined that it no longer had a legal basis to hold him. Following his release, the US added Daqduq to its list of Specially Designated Global Terrorists (SDGT) pursuant to Executive Order 13224.

== Return to Hezbollah ==
Following his release, Daqduq returned to Lebanon and helped train Hezbollah's special forces, including the Radwan Force. The Israel Defense Forces (IDF) said that he served as a commander in the Radwan Force, the Nasser Unit's Operations Department, and as the commander of Hezbollah's infantry unit.

According to Israel, he arrived in Syria in 2018 to form Hezbollah's "Golan File" unit, which would operate against Israel from southern Syria and southern Lebanon. The unit was based in the Druze village of Hader and was kept secret from the Assad regime. It was revealed on 13 March 2019 by IDF spokesperson Lt. Col. Jonathan Conricus, who accused Daqduq of having come back to Lebanon and then Syria, and founded a Hezbollah-operated network of "a few" Syrian operatives manning outposts in Hader and collecting intelligence against Israeli targets. The accusation included video footage of men walking to and from the outposts.

== Personal life and death ==
Daqduq's son, Hassan Ali Daqduq, was killed in an Israeli airstrike in Syria's Quneitra Governorate in December 2023.

On 10 November 2024, NBC News reported, citing an American defense source, that Daqduq was killed by an Israeli airstrike in Damascus, Syria. The strike killed nine people, however a Lebanese security source and the Syrian Observatory for Human Rights reported that Daqduq survived with injuries. On 14 June 2026, Israeli forces announced that they had killed Daqduq in an airstrike south of the Litani River in southern Lebanon on 12 June. His death was confirmed by Qais al-Khazali, the leader of Asa'ib Ahl al-Haq.
