= Akram al-Kaabi =

Iraqi paramilitary leader (born 1977)

- أكرم الكعبي
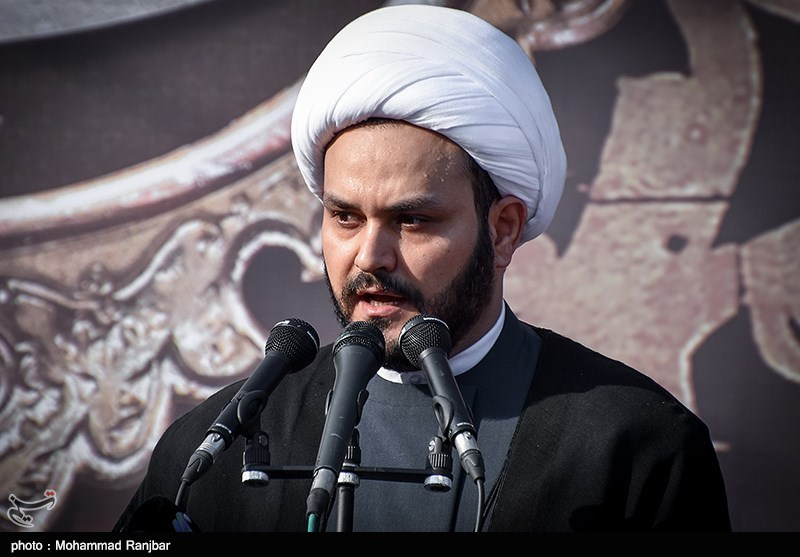

Secretary-General of Harakat Hezbollah al-Nujaba
- Incumbent
- Assumed office 2013

Personal details
- Born: 17 July 1977 (age 49) Amarah, Ba'athist Iraq

Military service
- Allegiance: Axis of Resistance
- Branch/service: Mahdi Army (2003–2008); Popular Mobilization Forces (2014–2020); Islamic Resistance in Iraq (2020-present)
- Unit: Harakat Hezbollah al-Nujaba
- Battles/wars: Iraq War; War in Iraq (2013–2017); Iraq War: Battle of Najaf (2004); Siege of Sadr City; 2004 Iraq spring fighting; Battle of Baghdad (2006–2008); Sectarian violence in Iraq; 2008 Iraq spring fighting; Syrian civil war; Siege of Aleppo; 2017 Abu Kamal offensive; Rif Dimashq offensive (February–April 2018); Syrian Desert campaign; War in Iraq (2013–2017); Siege of Amirli; Liberation of Jurf Al Sakhar; Middle Eastern crisis (2023–present); Attacks on US bases; 2026 United States–Israeli strikes on Iraq

Akram Abbas al-Ka'abi (Arabic: أكرم الكعبي; born 17 July 1977) is an Iraqi militant leader who is the founder and Secretary-General of Harakat Hezbollah al-Nujaba (HHN) in Iraq. Kaabi is a U.S.-designated terrorist who is regarded as one of the main operatives of the Iranian IRGC's Quds Force in Iraq. He has been an ardent supporter and promoter of Iranian influence in Iraq while being the most outspoken critic of American military presence as he seeks to compel U.S. forces to withdraw completely from Iraq. He has openly announced his willingness to overthrow the Iraqi political system as well as his subservience to the Supreme Leader of Iran.

Al-Kaabi's militia, HHN, emerged in 2013 as an offshoot of the Iraqi Shi'ite paramilitary group Asa'ib Ahl al-Haq.

== Allegiance to Iran ==
In an interview conducted by Al Sumaria, al-Kaabi openly admitted his willingness to mutiny, stating, "a military coup or overthrow of the [Iraqi] regime cannot be carried out except by a decision of the religious authorities … [we are able to] overthrow the system of government if there is a ["fatwa"] for it". He has also stated, "if following the mandate of Wilayat al-Faqih is considered subservience, then let [the whole world] bear witness that we are subordinate to it".

Following new U.S. aviation sanctions on Iranian airlines in September 2026, Iranian flights were suspended at the airports of Baghdad, Najaf, Erbil and Sulaymaniyah. Sheikh Akram al-Kaabi called on political groups on Friday to end "U.S. hegemony" and restore normal flight operations with the Islamic Republic of Iran. He threatened that if the issue remains unresolved, he would call on people to stage sit-ins at Iraqi airports.

== Early life and militant career ==
Al-Kaabi was born in 1977 in the city of Amarah, a Shi'ite city in southern Iraq. He studied religion in the Shi'ite holy city of Najaf, where he was a student of Ayatollah Muhammad-Sadiq al-Sadr, father of Iraqi Shia cleric and militia leader Muqtada al-Sadr. Afterwards he went on to serve as an imam at a mosque in the city of Musayyib in central Iraq. In 2003, al-Kaabi joined the Sadrist Mahdi Army, where he planned and led attacks against Iraqi and U.S.-led Coalition forces with training and funding from Iran's Quds Force. He left the Mahdi Army in 2008 and later became the deputy leader of Asa'ib Ahl al-Haq. In two instances al-Kaabi has stated he would overthrow the Iraqi government if ordered by Iran’s Supreme Leader Ali Khamenei. Al-Kaabi formed HHN militia in 2013 in response to the rise of ISIS in Syria, calling for Iraqi Shi'ite militias to travel to Syria and fight alongside the Syrian government.

== Sanctions ==
On 16 September 2008, the U.S. Department of the Treasury designated Akram al-Kaabi as a Specially Designated Global Terrorist (SDGT) "for threatening the peace and stability of Iraq." The sanction is based on Executive Order 13438 and al-Kaabi was placed on OFAC's Specially Designated Nationals List.

On 5 March 2019, the U.S. Department of State designated al-Kaabi as an international terrorist pursuant to the counterterrorism authority Executive Order 13224 due to his involvement in carrying out attacks against Coalition forces and innocent Iraqi citizens.
