= Promised Day Brigade =

Iraqi Shia militia group (2008–2014)

- Another flag of the group. The text is لَبَّيْك يَا مُحَمَّد (Labbaik yā Muḥammad), "At your service, o Muhammad!"
- Leader: Muqtada al-Sadr
- Dates active: November 2008 – June 2014
- Allegiance: Muqtada Al-Sadr
- Headquarters: Sadr City, Baghdad
- Active regions: Iraq and Syria (2011–2014)
- Ideology: Shia Islamism; Khomeinism; Anti-Sunnism
- Size: 15,000 (2008); 5,000 (2011)
- Part of: Special Groups
- Wars: the Iraq War

The Promised Day Brigade (PDB; Arabic: لواء اليوم الموعود, romanized: Liwāʾ al-Yawm al-Mawʿūd), originally called the Muqawimun (Arabic: المقاومون, romanized: al-Muqāwimūn, "Resisters"), was a Shiite organization and insurgent group operating during the Iraq War and later the Syrian Civil War. In 2010, it was one of the largest and most powerful "Special Groups" — an American term for Iranian-backed Shiite paramilitary groups in Iraq.

The group was created as successor to Muqtada al-Sadr's Mahdi Army, which was Iraq's largest Shiite militant group until its disbanding in 2008; he also called on other Special Groups to join the brigade. Sadr had earlier already talked about the creation of a smaller guerrilla unit which would continue the Mahdi Army's armed activities but for the first time gave the organisation a name in November 2008 when he declared the creation of the Promised Day Brigade. Its activities had particularly increased since May 2009. The group's name is in reference to an alternate term for the Islamic Day of Judgment. In 2013, the US military alleged that the group was receiving Iranian support. A crackdown against the group, at the end 2009, led to the arrest of 18 of its members including several commanders. On November 29, 2009, the group's leader in Basra was arrested in al-Amarah.

In October 2009, the Promised Day Brigade fought a battle with rival Special Group Asa'ib Ahl al-Haq for influence in Sadr City. The Promised Day Brigade reportedly won the battle and even managed to destroy the house of Abdul Hadi al-Darraji, a senior Asa'ib Ahl al-Haq leader. Since then, the PDB had been the most powerful Special Group in the ex-Mahdi Army stronghold of Sadr City and had increased its activity there.

On July 21, 2010, General Ray Odierno said Iran supports three Shiite groups in Iraq that had attempted to attack US bases: US officials believe that of these three groups, the Promised Day Brigades poses the greatest threat to Iraq's long-term security.

1. the Promised Day Brigades
2. Kata'ib Hezbollah (Hezbollah Brigades)
3. Asaib Ahl al-Haq (League of the Righteous)

== See also ==
- List of armed groups in the Syrian Civil War
