= Abu Deraa =

Iraqi militant (died 2021)

- اسماعيل حافظ اللامي
- Born: Ismail Hafiz al-Lami
- Military career
- Allegiance: Mahdi Army (formerly)
- Nickname: Abu Deraa

Ismail Hafidh al-Lami (Arabic: اسماعيل حافظ اللامي) — known as Abu Deraa (Arabic: أبو درع, "Father of the Shield") is a Shia Iraqi militant.

== Biography ==
Little is known about Abu Deraa's background. He is believed to have fled to Sadr City as a refugee, having fled to Baghdad following the destruction of the southern Shiite villages by Saddam. He is believed to be married, with two children.

Abu Deraa operated out of Sadr City, which is also the stronghold of Shiite cleric Muqtada al-Sadr's militia, the Mahdi Army. He has gained a reputation for his command of Shiite death squads and brutal attacks targeting terrorists and cases of mass kidnappings in broad daylight.

He was also accused of orchestrating the kidnapping and assassination of Saddam Hussein's lawyer Khamis al-Obeidi. Abu Deraa's son was reported to have pulled the trigger.

Militias loyal to Abu Deraa were also known to burn houses that belonged to Sadr City's Sunni minority as part of their campaign to cleanse the area of terrorists.

== Attacks ==
- Deraa is said to have been responsible for the abduction of scores of Sunnis whose bodies have been recovered from a garbage dump at al-Sada, a lawless wasteland near Sadr City.
- He allegedly commandeered a fleet of government ambulances with which he lured 40–50 young Sunnis to their deaths, driving the ambulances into the Sunni-dominated quarter of Adhamiyah in Baghdad, announcing over the loudspeakers: "Please give blood for the insurgency! The Shiia are killing your insurgency brothers!'."
- Abu Deraa is also rumoured to have masterminded the kidnapping of Sunni MP Tayseer al-Mashhadani in July 2006, who was released after two months of captivity.
- He also is said to have supervised the forced eviction of hundreds of Sunni families from Shiite-dominated areas of the Baghdad and some outlying towns.
- Deraa is reputed to have overseen the abduction of five British citizens from the Iraqi Finance Ministry on May 29, 2007.

== False claims of death ==
In a statement released December 4, 2006, the Islamic State of Iraq claimed responsibility for the killing of Abu Deraa on a road north of Baghdad. The claim came three days after a statement released by the Islamic Army in Iraq that also claimed responsibility for the killing of Abu Deraa. It has been claimed that he had taken part in a by-proxy interview with The Sydney Morning Herald conducted by veteran Middle East correspondent Paul McGeough on December 20, 2006. His first exclusive interview, published on November 16, 2006, was with Reuters.

According to US intelligence, Abu Deraa fled to Iran to evade capture in early 2007 and has since then commanded his forces out of Iran. In August 2010, after Iraqi Prime Minister Nouri al-Maliki formed a coalition government with rebel cleric Muqtada al-Sadr, there were reports that Abu Deraa was allowed to return to Iraq.

=== 2014 appearance ===
Abu Deraa appeared in an anti-ISIS rally staged by the Promised Day Brigades in June 2014 in a show of force in response to recent ISIS gains.

== See also ==
- Abu Azrael
