= Badr Organization =

Badr Organization منظمة بدر
- Leader: Hadi al-Amiri
- Supreme Leader: Mojtaba Khamenei
- Allegiance: Iran
- Founded: 1982 as the military wing of the ISCI; 2003–present as a political movement
- Ideology: Shia Islamism; Khomeinism; Wilayat al-Faqih; Anti-Sunnism
- Political position: Right-wing
- Religion: Shia Islam
- National affiliation: National Iraqi Alliance (2005–2014); State of Law Coalition (2014–18); Fatah Alliance (2018–2025)
- International affiliation: Axis of Resistance
- Seats in the Council of Representatives of Iraq: 18 / 329

Badr Organization
- Leader: Hadi al-Amiri
- Supreme Leader: Mojtaba Khamenei
- Dates active: 1982–2003 (officially); 2014–present
- Allegiance: Iran (IRGC)
- Group: Structure
- Headquarters: Najaf, Iraq
- Active regions: Baghdad and Southern Iraq
- Size: 15,000 (2008); 10,000–15,000 (2014)
- Part of: (Iran) Islamic Revolutionary Guard Corps (originally); Popular Mobilization Forces (2014–present)
- Wars: Iraq War, Iraqi Civil War

The Badr Organization (Arabic: منظمة بدر Munaẓẓama Badr), previously known as the Badr Brigades or Badr Corps, is an Iraqi Shia Islamist and Khomeinist political party and paramilitary organization headed by Hadi al-Amiri. The Badr Brigade, formed in 1982 and led by Iranian officers, served as the military arm of the Supreme Council for Islamic Revolution in Iraq (SCIRI), a Shia Islamic party based in Iran. The Badr Brigade was created by Iranian intelligence and Shia cleric Mohammad Baqir al-Hakim with the aim of fighting the Ba'athist regime of Saddam Hussein during the Iran–Iraq War. Since the 2003 US-led invasion of Iraq, most of the Badr Brigade fighters have entered the new Iraqi army and police force. Since 2003, the Badr Brigade and SCIRI were considered to be one party, but have recently unofficially separated with the Badr Organization now being an official Iraqi political party. Badr Brigade forces, and their Iranian commanders, have come to prominence in 2014 fighting the Islamic State of Iraq and the Levant (ISIL) in Iraq. It is a part of the Popular Mobilization Forces.

== History ==
=== SCIRI ===
The organization was formed in Iran in 1982 as the military wing of the Supreme Council for Islamic Revolution in Iraq. It was based in Iran for two decades during the rule of Saddam Hussein and led by Iranian officers. It consisted of several thousand Iraqi exiles, refugees, and Iraqi Army defectors who fought alongside Iranian troops in the Iran–Iraq War. The group was armed and directed by Iran.

They briefly returned to Iraq in 1991 during the 1991 Iraqi uprising to fight against the government of Saddam Hussein, focusing on the Shia holy cities of Najaf and Karbala. They retreated into Iran after the uprising was brutally crushed by the Ba'athist regime.

In 1995, during the Iraqi Kurdish Civil War, Iran deployed 5,000 Badr fighters to Iraqi Kurdistan to support the PUK forces.

=== Post-invasion Iraq ===
Returning to Iraq following the 2003 US-led invasion, the group changed its name from brigade to organization in response to the attempted voluntary disarming of Iraqi militias by the Coalition Provisional Authority. It is however widely believed the organization was still active as a militia within the security forces and it had been accused of running a secret prison and sectarian killings during the Iraqi Civil War.

Because of their opposition to Saddam Hussein, the Badr Brigade was seen as a U.S. asset in the fight against Baathist partisans. After the fall of Baghdad, Badr forces reportedly joined the newly reconstituted army, police, and the Interior Ministry in significant numbers. The Interior Ministry was controlled by SCIRI, and many Badr members became part of the Interior Ministry-run Wolf Brigade. The Iraqi Interior Minister, Bayan Jabr, was a former leader of Badr Brigade militia.

In 2006 the United Nations human rights chief in Iraq, John Pace, said that hundreds of Iraqis were being tortured to death or executed by the Interior Ministry under SCIRI's control. According to a 2006 report by the Independent newspaper:

"Mr Pace said the Ministry of the Interior was 'acting as a rogue element within the government'. It was controlled by the main Shia party, the Supreme Council for Islamic Revolution in Iraq (SCIRI); the Interior Minister, Baqir Jabr al-Zubeidi, is a former leader of SCIRI's Badr Brigade militia, which was one of the main groups accused of carrying out sectarian killings. Another was the Mahdi Army of the young cleric Muqtada al-Sadr, who is now part of the Shia coalition seeking to form a government after winning the mid-December election.

Many of the 110,000 policemen and police commandos under the ministry's control are suspected of being former members of the Badr Brigade. Not only counterinsurgency units such as the Wolf Brigade, the Scorpions, and the Tigers, but the commandos and even the highway patrol police were accused of acting as death squads during this period over a decade ago.

The paramilitary commandos, dressed in garish camouflage uniforms and driving around in pick-up trucks, were dreaded in Sunni neighbourhoods. People arrested by them during this period were frequently found dead several days later with their bodies bearing obvious marks of torture."

=== Military action against ISIL ===
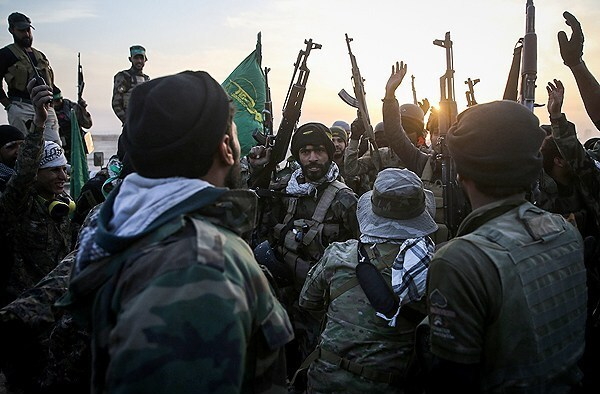
Badr Organization soldiers before the Battle of Tal Afar

Following ISIL's successful Anbar campaign and June 2014 offensive, the Badr Organization mobilized and won a series of battles against ISIL, including the Liberation of Jurf Al Sakhr and the Lifting of the Siege of Amirli. In early February 2015, the group, operating from its base at Camp Ashraf, fought in Diyala Governorate against ISIL. Over 100 militia were killed in the fighting, including 25 in Al Mansouryah. Badr's leader, Hadi al-Amiri, said his militiamen were committed to the safety of Sunnis, but deep mutual suspicions remained in the light of recent sectarian killings and the suspicion that some Sunni tribes were allied with IS. A leaked US diplomatic cable cited sources alleging that Hadi al-Amiri had personally ordered attacks on Sunnis.

=== 2026 Iran war ===
Following the assassination of Ali Khamenei during the 2026 Iran war, Badr Organization leader Hadi al-Amiri pledged allegiance to the new supreme leader of Iran, Mojtaba Khamenei.

== Structure ==
The Badr Corps consists of infantry, armor, artillery, anti-aircraft, and commando units with an estimated strength of between 10,000 and 50,000 men (according to the Badr Organization).

- Quwat al-Shahid Muhammed Baqir al-Sadr
- Imam Muhammad al-Jawad Brigade
- Karbala Brigade
- Tashkil al-Karar
- The Turkmen Brigade Northern Front
- Quwat al-Shaheed al-Qa'id Abu Muntadhar al-Muhammadawi
- Tashkil Malik al-Ashtar
- Feyli Kurd Brigade – 16 June 2014
  - Led by Secretary-General of Supreme National Front of Feyli Kurds, Maher al-Feyli
  - Size: 1,000–5,000
  - Helped by: Saad al-Madlabi (from State of Law Coalition) and Mouin Al-Kazmi

== Scientific evaluation ==
The German Institute for International and Security Affairs (SWP) recognized a rise in the Shiite Badr organization since 2014 under the leadership of its Secretary General Hadi al-Amiri. In 2017, SWP wrote that the Badr organization is one of "the most important actors in Iraqi politics". It has become the most important instrument of Iranian politics in Iraq. Its aim is "to exert the greatest possible influence on the central government in Baghdad and at the same time to build the strongest possible Shiite militias that are dependent on Iran". The foundation compared the role of the organization with that of Hezbollah in Lebanon.

== Election results ==
Election	Leader	Votes	%	Seats	+/–	Position	Government
Jan 2005	Hadi Al-Amiri	As part of UIA		140 / 275	New	▲1st	Coalition
Dec 2005	Hadi Al-Amiri	As part of UIA		36 / 275	—N/a	—N/a	Coalition
2010	Hadi Al-Amiri	As part of NIA		39 / 325	▲3	—N/a	Coalition
2014	Hadi Al-Amiri	As part of State of Law		8 / 328	▼31	—N/a	Coalition
2018	Hadi Al-Amiri	As part of Fatah		22 / 329	▲14	—N/a	Coalition
2021	Hadi Al-Amiri	As part of Fatah		17 / 329	▼5	—N/a	Coalition
2025	Hadi Al-Amiri	556,850	4.96%	18 / 329	▲1	▲6th	Coalition

== See also ==
- Private militias in Iraq
- List of armed groups in the War in Iraq (2013-17)
- List of armed groups in the Syrian Civil War
- Holy Shrine Defender
