= 2011 alleged Iran assassination plot =

Failed assassination attempt in the U.S.

2011 Iran assassination plot
- Part of Iran–Saudi Arabia proxy conflict and Iran–Israel proxy conflict
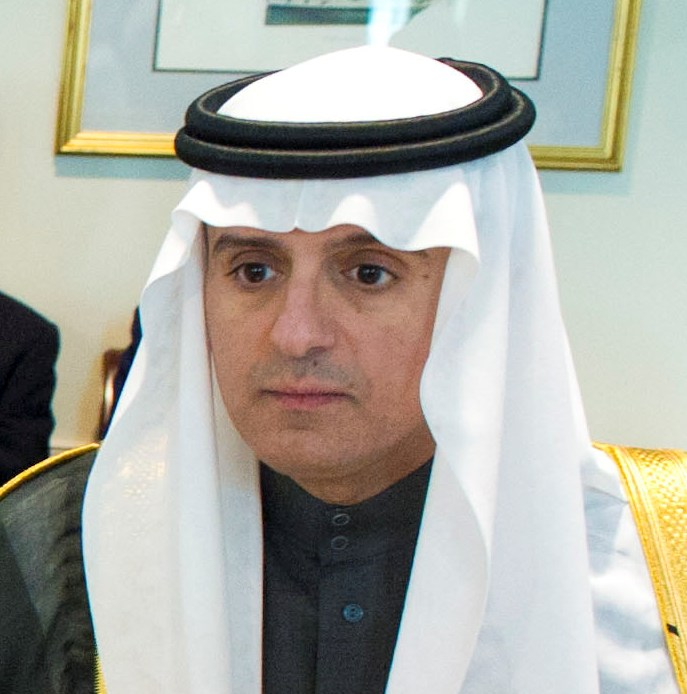
- Ambassador Adel al-Jubeir
- Date: 29 September 2011 (arrests); 11 October 2011 (announcement)
- Venue: A local restaurant, the Embassy of Israel and the Embassy of Saudi Arabia
- Location: Washington, D.C., United States
- Also known as: Iran assassination plot or the "Iran terror plot" (media); Operation Red Coalition (FBI)
- Type: Terrorism
- Cause: Iran–Saudi Arabia proxy conflict
- Suspects: Manssor Arbabsiar and Gholam Shakuri (at large)
- Convicted: 30 May 2013
- Charges: To participate in a plot allegedly directed by elements of the Iranian government to murder the Saudi Ambassador to the United States with explosives
- Verdict: Guilty
- Sentence: 25 years imprisonment (Manssor Arbabsiar)

On 11 October 2011, United States officials alleged there was a plot tied to the Iranian government to assassinate Saudi ambassador Adel al-Jubeir in the United States. The plot was referred to as the "Iran assassination plot" or the "Iran terror plot" in the media, while the Federal Bureau of Investigation named the case "Operation Red Coalition". Iranian nationals Manssor Arbabsiar and Gholam Shakuri were charged on 11 October 2011 in federal court in New York with plotting to assassinate Al-Jubeir. According to U.S. officials, the two planned to kill Al-Jubeir at a restaurant with a bomb and subsequently bomb the Saudi embassy and the Israeli embassy in Washington, D.C. Bombings in Buenos Aires were also discussed. Arbabsiar was arrested on 29 September 2011 at John F. Kennedy International Airport in New York while Shakuri remained at large. On 24 October 2011, Arbabsiar pleaded not guilty. In May 2013, after pleading guilty, Arbabsiar was sentenced to 25-years imprisonment.

It is debated whether the Iranian government condoned or facilitated the plot; some experts suggested that the planners may be rogue elements within the Iranian secret service.

== Assassination plot ==
=== Charges announced ===
On 11 October 2011, the U.S. Attorney General and the Director of the FBI announced two individuals have been charged in federal court for their participation in a plot allegedly directed by elements of the Iranian government to murder the Saudi Ambassador to the United States with explosives while the Ambassador was in the United States. "The criminal complaint unsealed today exposes a deadly plot directed by factions of the Iranian government to assassinate a foreign Ambassador on U.S. soil with explosives," said Attorney General Eric Holder. "Though it reads like the pages of a Hollywood script, the impact would have been very real and many lives would have been lost," FBI Director Robert Mueller said. The criminal complaint charged Manssor Arbabsiar, a 56-year-old naturalized U.S. citizen holding both Iranian and U.S. passports, and Gholam Shakuri, a commander in Iran's Quds Force, the special-operations unit of the Islamic Revolutionary Guard Corps.

The U.S. Government alleged that the Quds Force "conducts sensitive covert operations abroad, including terrorist attacks, assassinations and kidnappings, and is believed to sponsor attacks against Coalition Forces in Iraq." In October 2007, the U.S. Treasury Department had designated the Quds Force as providing material support to the Taliban and other terrorist organizations. The defendants were charged with conspiracy to murder a foreign official, conspiracy to engage in foreign travel and use of interstate and foreign commerce facilities in the commission of murder-for-hire, conspiracy to use a weapon of mass destruction, and conspiracy to commit an act of international terrorism transcending national boundaries.

=== Plot ===
The details of the plot were established in later court proceedings. According to these events, Arbabsiar met with Shakuri from the spring of 2011 to October 2011 to plot the murder of the Saudi Ambassador, and met with a Drug Enforcement Administration (DEA) source in Mexico who posed as an associate of an international drug trafficking cartel. According to the complaint, Arbabsiar arranged to hire the source to murder the Ambassador using explosives, and Shakuri and other Iran-based co-conspirators were aware of and approved the plan. With Shakuri's approval, Arbabsiar caused $100,000 to be wired into a bank account in the United States as a down payment for the killing. In June and July 2011, the complaint stated, Arbabsiar returned to Mexico and held additional meetings with the DEA source, where Arbabsiar explained that his associates in Iran had discussed a number of further missions they wanted the source and his associates to perform, including the murder of the Ambassador.

During a 14 July 2011 meeting in Mexico, the source and Arbabsiar agreed that four men would be used to orchestrate the Ambassador's killing and that the total price would be $1.5 million for the murder. Arbabsiar also assured the source that $100,000 would be forthcoming from Iran as a further payment towards the assassination and discussed the manner in which that payment would be made. During the meeting, Arbabsiar described having a cousin in Iran who was a "big general" in the military, and had requested that Arbabsiar find someone to carry out the Ambassador's assassination. In a 17 July 2011 meeting in Mexico, the source told Arbabsiar that one of his workers had traveled to Washington, D.C. and had observed the Ambassador. They discussed bombing a restaurant in the United States that the Ambassador frequented. The source told Arbabsiar there might be innocent civilian casualties, to which Arbabsiar replied "They want that guy done, if a hundred go with him, f**k 'em", and that such concerns were "no big deal". On 1 August 2011 and 9 August 2011, with Shakuri's approval, Arbabsiar caused two overseas wire transfers totaling approximately $100,000 to be sent as a down payment for carrying out the assassination.

=== Arrest and confession ===
On 20 September 2011, the source told Arbabsiar that the operation was ready and requested that Arbabsiar either pay one half of the agreed upon price of $1.5 million or that Arbabsiar personally travel to Mexico as collateral for the final payment. According to the complaint, Arbabsiar agreed to travel to Mexico, and did so on 28 September 2011. He was refused entry by Mexican authorities and flown to John F. Kennedy International Airport in New York where he was promptly arrested by U.S. federal agents and subsequently confessed to the plot. According to the complaint, Arbabsiar told agents that he was "recruited, funded and directed by men he understood to be senior officials in Iran's Quds Force," including his cousin who he had "long understood to be a senior member of the Quds Force." Arbabsiar claimed he had met several times in Iran with Shakuri and another senior Quds Force official where they discussed blowing up a restaurant in the United States frequented by the Ambassador and that numerous bystanders could be killed.

In early October 2011, according to the complaint, Arbabsiar made phone calls at the direction of law enforcement agents to Shakuri in Iran that were secretly monitored. During these phone calls, Shakuri confirmed that Arbabsiar should move forward with the plot to murder the Ambassador and that he should accomplish the task as quickly as possible, stating on 5 October 2011, "just do it quickly, it's late..." Investigations by the FBI disclosed that money had been wired from a Quds Force bank account, and that Arbabsiar correctly identified a known Quds Force officer from a photo array shown to him in custody.

==== Conviction ====
On 24 October 2011, Arbabsiar at first pleaded not guilty, but later changed his plea to guilty. On 30 May 2013, he was sentenced to 25 years in prison.

Manssor Arbabsiar, register number 65807-054, is now currently serving his sentence at Marion USP with a projected release date of 28 July 2033.

=== Alleged responsibility ===
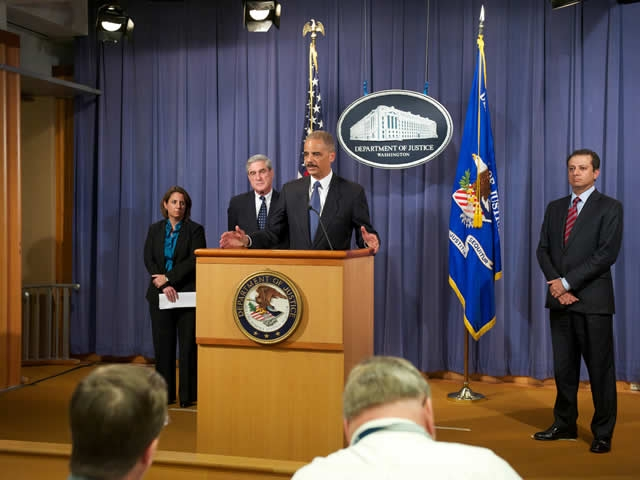
US Attorney General Eric Holder announces the charges

U.S. officials said that it was "more than likely" that Iran's Supreme Leader, Ayatollah Ali Khamenei and the head of the Quds Force, Major General Qasem Soleimani, knew of the plot, but acknowledged this was based on analysis rather than hard evidence. They speculated it was inconceivable that in Iran's hierarchy Khamenei or Suleimani would not be aware of such an action, stating "it would be our assessment that this kind of operation would have been discussed at the highest levels of the regime." The officials acknowledged that the plot was far "outside the pattern" of the Quds Force past activity.

Other commentators speculated that the men may have been acting as rogue elements in the Iranian government rather than the actual government itself. A senior U.S. law enforcement official who would speak only on the condition of anonymity stated, "It's so outside their normal track of activity. It's a rogue plan or they're using very different tactics. We just don't know." The government of Iran vehemently denied the accusations and Iran's United Nations representative called the confession "suspicious claims by an individual," and said his claims were fabricated. While the U.S. Department of Justice said Shakuri was still at large, Iran claimed Shakuri belonged to an Iranian exile opposition group aiming to overthrow the Iranian Government.

== Skepticism ==
At the same time, a number of prominent Iran experts have questioned the Iranian government's link to the plot. Suzanne Maloney, senior fellow at The Saban Center for Middle East Policy at the Brookings Institution, said much of what was known of the plot did "not fit the usual patterns of Iran's involvement with terrorist activities. It seems quite credible to me that it could be rogue elements, but I don't know to what degree the Iranian military tolerates such dissent." Alireza Nader, an Iran analyst at the Rand Corporation, found it "difficult" to believe that Khamenei or Suleimani would order such an attack that "would put all of Iran's objectives and strategies at risk". If an Iranian agent was responsible for planning the assassination attempt, it parallels event in 1998, when the murder of prominent Iranian nationalists and writers was organised by three rogue Iranian secret service operatives, part of the Quds Forces

Kenneth Katzman, a Middle East analyst at the Congressional Research Service, said, "There is simply no precedent – or even reasonable rationale – for Iran working any plot, no matter where located, through a non-Muslim proxy such as Mexican drug gangs.... The Iranian modus operandi is only to trust sensitive plots to their own employees, or to trusted proxies such as Hezbollah, Saudi Hezbollah, Hamas, the Sadr faction in Iraq, Iran-friendly extremist Muslims in Afghanistan and other pro-Iranian Muslim groups." However, US officials argued that Iran may have needed to use "a far riskier proxy" because "it has far fewer agents in the United States". In 2013, Dexter Filkins described the attack as one of at least thirty directed by Iran's Quds force "in places as far flung as Thailand, New Delhi, Lagos, and Nairobi". Filkins noted that "The Quds Force appears to be more effective close to home, and a number of the remote plans have gone awry."

=== Mental status ===
Dr. Michael B. First, editor of the DSM-IV-TR, and Dr. Joel Morgan, of the APA Council, testified that Manssor Arbabsiar has bipolar disorder. They said he has manic episodes in which he is not well in touch with reality, and that he has difficulty "comprehending the circumstances surrounding a particular decision or appreciating the consequences of that decision. Individuals with bipolar disorder who are in a manic state frequently display feelings of invincibility and grandiosity. These feelings may cause them to enter into agreements that they would not otherwise enter into." They also said he has "impaired cognitive functioning."

A former partner said that Arbabsiar was known for being disorganized – for losing keys, forgetting to pay his bills, and getting important details wrong. "If they wanted 007, I think they got Mr. Bean," he stated.

== Aftermath ==
=== Act of war ===
Several senior U.S. politicians, both Democrat and Republican, said the alleged plot could constitute an act of war by Iran. Senator Carl Levin, a Democrat who serves as chairman of the Senate Armed Services Committee says the plot may be an act of war against the United States. Republican Representative Michael McCaul shared his view. Republican Senator Mark Kirk called the plot an "act of war" and called on the Obama administration to consider sanctioning the Central Bank of Iran in response. However, Judge Andrew Napolitano stated that the plot, even if it had been sanctioned by members of the Iranian government, and though an affront to the United States, is legally not an act of war, but rather a criminal act, because there was no violence actually committed, and the matter has been taken to federal court. Congressional counter-terrorism advisor Michael S. Smith II of Kronos Advisory, LLC, who presented Congress a report on the Quds Force in April 2011, commented "If the rapidly expanding presence in our neighborhood of militant Islamist groups which accept directives from Iran's Quds Force special operations unit remains unchecked, the recent plot will most likely come to resemble a tip of the iceberg in terms of what could unfold within America's borders."

U.S. Congressman Jeff Duncan (R−SC), introduced a House resolution urging the Obama administration to more closely examine terrorist threats in the Western Hemisphere emanating from Iran. The resolution calls for the Obama administration to: "Include the Western Hemisphere in the Administration's 2012 National Strategy for Counterterrorism's 'Area of Focus,’ which was absent in the 2011 edition." It also calls on the Department of Homeland Security, along with other agencies, "to examine Iran's presence, activity, and relationships in the Western Hemisphere, including the U.S." The resolution was co-sponsored by Democratic Congressman Brian Higgins of New York. On 31 January 2012, Director of National Intelligence, James R. Clapper, testified that Iran was prepared for a series of attacks on the United States, citing the assassination plot as a reflection of willingness for the country's terrorist efforts.

In 2019, former Defense Secretary James Mattis, in his book Call Sign Chaos: Learning To Lead wrote that "Attorney General Eric Holder said the bombing plot was 'directed and approved by elements of the Iranian government and, specifically, senior members of the Qods Force.' The Qods were the Special Operations Force of the Revolutionary Guards, reporting to the top of the Iranian government". He criticized the Obama Administration for its handling of the terrorist plot, stating that "We treated an act of war as a law enforcement violation, jailing the low-level courier".

=== Sanctions ===
On 12 October 2011, President Obama imposed new sanctions on Iran and the White House said more actions would be taken. Three weeks after US officials accused Iran of an assassination plot to be carried out on US soil, the House Foreign Affairs Committee voted to expand sanctions against Iran. The far-ranging bill includes targeting Iran's central bank. Such action against Iran's central bank – which serves as a clearinghouse for nearly all oil and gas payments in Iran – will make it more difficult for Iran to sell crude oil, its chief source of cash, by blocking companies doing business with it from also working with US financial institutions. Some Iranian officials have likened such a step to an act of war. The House Foreign Affairs Committee has also passed the Iran Threat Reduction Act which makes it illegal for U.S. diplomats to engage their Iranian counterparts, strips the President's authority to license the repair of Iran's aging civilian aircraft to prevent civilian deaths, and imposes indiscriminate sanctions that could increase gas prices and hurt the Iranian civil society.

=== Reactions ===
==== United States ====
US President Barack Obama stated: "Even if at the highest levels there was not detailed operational knowledge, there has to be accountability with respect to anybody in the Iranian government engaging in this kind of activity." Vice President Joe Biden said that Iran would be held accountable for the plot and described it as "an outrage that violates one of the fundamental premises upon which nations deal with one another and that is the sanctity and safety of their diplomats". Secretary of State Hillary Clinton called the incident a "flagrant violation of international and United States law".

==== Iran ====
Iranian President Mahmoud Ahmadinejad denied the accusations, calling them a "fabrication". Mohammad Khazaee, the Ambassador of Iran to the United Nations, stated that he was "shocked to hear such a big lie" and that the version of events presented by the United States was an "insult to the common sense". Khazaee wrote in a letter to Secretary-General of the United Nations Ban Ki-moon that Iran "strongly and categorically rejects these fabricated and baseless allegations, based on the suspicious claims by an individual." Ali Larijani, chairman of the Iranian parliament, said that the claims asserted by the United States were a "childish game". A spokesman for the Ministry of Foreign Affairs told the Iranian Students News Agency that "Iran strongly denies the untrue and baseless allegations". Ayatollah Ali Khamenei, the Supreme Leader of Iran, described the allegations as "meaningless and absurd".

==== Saudi Arabia ====
Turki bin Faisal Al Saud, a former Ambassador of Saudi Arabia to the United States, stated that Iranian involvement in the plot was "overwhelming" and that "somebody in Iran will have to pay the price". Saudi Arabia and Iran have long competed for power and dominance in the Middle East, and some Saudi officials commented that the alleged assassination plot would represent an escalation in the confrontation between the two.

==== International ====
In France, a spokesman for the Ministry of Foreign and European Affairs released a statement saying: "For France, this is an extremely serious affair, an outrageous violation of international law, and its perpetrators and backers must be held accountable."

A statement released from the office of British Prime Minister David Cameron stated: "Indications that this plot was directed by elements of the Iranian regime are shocking. We will support measures to hold Iran accountable for its actions."

The Dutch minister of foreign affairs, Uri Rosenthal, has stated that he is "very, very, very, really exceptionally worried" about the alleged Iranian involvement in a plotted terrorist attack on civilians in the United States.

On 18 November 2011, the United Nations General Assembly passed a Saudi-drafted resolution called "Terrorist Attacks on Internationally Protected Persons". It received 106 votes in favor to 9 against with 41 abstentions. Armenia, Bolivia, Cuba, Ecuador, Iran, North Korea, Nicaragua, Venezuela and Zambia voted against the resolution while countries including China, India, Russia, Switzerland and Singapore abstained and expressed concerns regarding the resolution, saying that further investigation was required, proper evidence was needed and the plot needed to be investigated under what they called judicial standards. The Saudi delegate to the United Nations thanked the delegates on supporting the resolution, saying it shows a positive contribution to the fight against terrorism.

== See also ==
- Iran and state terrorism
- United States and state terrorism
- Iran–Saudi Arabia relations
- Iran–United States relations
- Iran–Israel proxy conflict
- Mexican drug war
- Dawud Salahuddin – last successful Iranian assassination plot on U.S. soil
