= Quds Force =

Iranian special external operations force (established 1988)

- Flag of Quds Force
- Founded: 1988; 38 years ago
- Country: Iran
- Type: Special operations force
- Role: Extraterritorial operations, Unconventional warfare, Military Intelligence, Black operations
- Size: 5,000
- Part of: Islamic Revolutionary Guard Corps
- Engagements: Iran–Iraq War; Soviet–Afghan War; Lebanese Civil War; 1982 Lebanon War; South Lebanon conflict (1985–2000); Yugoslav Wars; Bosnian War; War in Afghanistan (2001–2021); Battle of Herat; Insurgency in Sistan and Balochistan; Syrian civil war; Iranian intervention in Syria; Al-Qusayr offensive; 2015 Southern Syria offensive; Battle of Zabadani (2015); Kuweires offensive; Northwestern Syria offensive (October–November 2015); Aleppo offensive (October–December 2015); East Aleppo offensive (2015–2016); Northern Aleppo offensive (February 2016); Palmyra offensive (March 2016); 2016 Southern Aleppo campaign; 2016 Aleppo summer campaign; Aleppo offensive (September–October 2016); Aleppo offensive (October–November 2016); Operation Night of Power; Qalamoun offensive (2017); Eastern Syria campaign; Northwestern Syria campaign (October 2017 – February 2018); 2018 Southern Syria offensive; Idlib demilitarization (2018–2019); 2024 Syrian opposition offensives; Northwestern Syria offensive (2024); War in Iraq (2013–2017); Iranian intervention in Iraq; Northern Iraq offensive; Liberation of Jurf Al Sakhar; Salahuddin campaign; Siege of Amirli; Battle of Baiji; Second Battle of Tikrit; Anbar campaign (2015–2016); Siege of Fallujah (2016); Iran–PJAK conflict; Western Iran clashes; 2024 Iran–Israel conflict; Twelve-Day War; 2026 Iran war

Commanders
- Current commander: Brig. Gen. Esmail Qaani
- Deputy Commander: Brig. Gen. Mohammad Reza Fallahzadeh

Insignia
- Alternative Flag

The Quds Force (Persian: نیروی قدس, romanized: niru-ye qods, lit. 'The Jerusalem Force') is one of five branches of the Islamic Revolutionary Guard Corps (IRGC) of Iran. Considered an elite unit within the IRGC, it specializes in unconventional warfare and military intelligence operations. U.S. Army General Stanley McChrystal describes the Quds Force as being analogous to a combination of the CIA and the Joint Special Operations Command (JSOC).

Responsible for extraterritorial operations, the Quds Force has been described as the IRGC’s de facto external affairs branch. It supports non-state actors in many countries, including Hezbollah, Hamas, Palestinian Islamic Jihad, the Houthis, and Shia militias in Iraq, Syria, and Afghanistan; it has also deployed personnel in foreign conflicts such as the Syrian civil war and the Iraqi offensive against the Islamic State.

The Quds Force reports directly to the supreme leader of Iran, currently Mojtaba Khamenei since 8 March 2026. After Quds Force commander Qasem Soleimani was assassinated in a U.S. drone strike in January 2020, his deputy, Esmail Qaani, replaced him.

In 2019, the U.S. secretary of state designated the Islamic Revolutionary Guard Corps and Quds Force as a Foreign Terrorist Organization (FTO) based on the IRGC's "continued support to and engagement in terrorist activity around the world."; this was the first time that the U.S. designated a government entity as an FTO.

== Name ==
While the formation's official name is Quds Force (lit. 'Jerusalem Force'), it has also been referred to as the 'Quds Corps' (Persian: سپاه قدس, romanized: sepah-e qods) in Persian media. In Arabic, Jerusalem is most commonly known as القُدس al-Quds, meaning "The Holy" or "The Holy Sanctuary", cognate with Hebrew: הקדש, romanized: Ha-Qodesh, lit. 'The Holy'.

It was originally titled Corps but changed to Force by Khamenei.

== History and mission ==
The predecessor of the Quds Force, known as 'Department 900', was created during the Iran–Iraq War as a special intelligence unit, while the IRGC was allegedly active abroad in Afghanistan before the war. The department was later merged into 'Special External Operations Department'. After the Iran–Iraq War ended in 1988, the IRGC was reorganized and the Quds Force was established as an independent service branch. It has the mission of liberating "Muslim land", especially al-Quds, from which it takes its name—"Jerusalem Force" in English.

Both during and after the war, it provided support to the Kurds fighting Saddam Hussein. In 1982, a Quds unit was deployed to Lebanon, where it assisted in the genesis of Hezbollah. The Force also expanded its operations into neighboring Afghanistan, including assistance for Abdul Ali Mazari's Shi'a Hezbe Wahdat in the 1980s against the government of Mohammad Najibullah. It then began funding and supporting Ahmad Shah Massoud's Northern Alliance against the Taliban. However, in recent years, the Quds Force is alleged to have been helping and guiding the Taliban insurgents against the NATO-backed Karzai administration. There were also reports of the unit lending support to Bosnian Muslims fighting the Bosnian Serbs during the Bosnian War.

According to the Egyptian newspaper Al-Ahram, former Iranian President Mahmoud Ahmadinejad helped fund the Quds Force while he was stationed at the Ramazan garrison near Iraq, during the late 1980s.

In January 2010, according to the Washington Institute for Near East Policy, the mission of the Quds Force was expanded and the Force along with Hezbollah started a new campaign of attacks targeting not only the US and Israel but also other Western bodies.

In January 2020, Quds Force commander Major General Qasem Soleimani was killed by a US airstrike on his convoy outside Baghdad International Airport.

The Quds Force is run from Tehran and has ties with armed groups in Afghanistan, Iraq, Lebanon, Syria and the Palestinian territories.

=== Predecessors ===
==== Liberation Movements Unit ====
The LMU of the IRGC was established in 1981 by Mohammad Montazeri, son of Grand Ayatollah Hussein-Ali Montazeri, and Mehdi Hashemi, then a member of the IRGC Command Council and brother of Ayatollah Montazeri’s son-in-law. This unit was tasked with providing military assistance to "Islamic liberation movements" abroad, especially in Shia-majority countries ruled by Sunni minorities, including Bahrain, Iraq and Lebanon. Both Montazeri and Hashemi had themselves received irregular warfare training in Palestine Liberation Organization-run training camps in Southern Lebanon before the 1979 Iranian Revolution.

==== 9th Badr Brigade of the IRGC ====
During the Iran–Iraq War, Major-General Mohsen Rezaee, then the Commander-in-Chief of the Revolutionary Guards, ordered the formation of the 9th Badr Brigade, which consisted of Iraqi Shia fugitives who had fled from Saddam Hussein's persecution and were fighting for Iran. The Badr Brigade was manned by Iraqis but led by Iranian officers. Among the Badr Brigade's earliest Iraqi members were Abu Mahdi al-Muhandis, Deputy Chief of the Popular Mobilization Forces who was assassinated together with Soleimani in January 2020, and Brigadier-General Hadi al-Amiri, later Interior Minister of Iraq. Muhandis and Amiri took part in the 1986 Iranian Siege of Basra under the command of IRGC General Hassan Danaeifar. After the fall of Saddam Hussein, Danaeifar became the Iranian ambassador in Iraq between 2006 and 2010. Muhandis had fled Iraq to Kuwait in the early 1980s and allegedly collaborated with Lebanese Hezbollah's Chief of Military Operations Imad Mughniyeh in bombing the US embassy in Kuwait in 1983, after which he fled to Iran.

==== Ramadan Headquarters ====
In 1986 the Ramadan Headquarters of External Operations was created within the IRGC. This headquarters was responsible for Iran's links to Iraqi Kurdish groups, including the forces of the Kurdistan Democratic Party and the Patriotic Union of Kurdistan, led by Massoud Barzani and Jalal Talabani. One of the Ramadan Headquarters' senior commanders and its chief of staff in the 1980s was the IRGC Brigadier-General Iraj Masjedi, who from 2017 to 2022 served as Iran’s ambassador to Iraq. At the time, another commander of the Ramadan Headquarters was the IRGC Brigadier-General Mohammad Reza Naqdi, who was later appointed as commander of the Basij militia.

==== Lebanon Corps ====
The "Lebanon Corps" of the IRGC was established in June 1982 when Iran sent 1,500 Revolutionary Guard commandos to the Syrian-controlled Beqaa Valley of Eastern Lebanon to fight against Israel's invasion. This force was led by IRGC Brigadier-General Hossein Dehghan (later Defense Minister) and was tasked with training members of Hezbollah. Two other people who were influential in guiding and communicating with Hezbollah after Dehghan were IRGC Brigadier-General Ahmad Vahidi, the IRGC’s intelligence chief at the time and later the first commander of the Quds Force from its establishment in 1988 to 1998, and Fereydoun Vardinejad, later the Political Deputy of the Office of Iranian President Hassan Rouhani. Both Vahidi and Vardinejad were tasked in 1985 by Ali Akbar Hashemi Rafsanjani and the IRGC to negotiate with Robert McFarlane, U.S. President Ronald Reagan's special envoy to Iran, on the issue of the Lebanon hostage crisis.

== Organization ==
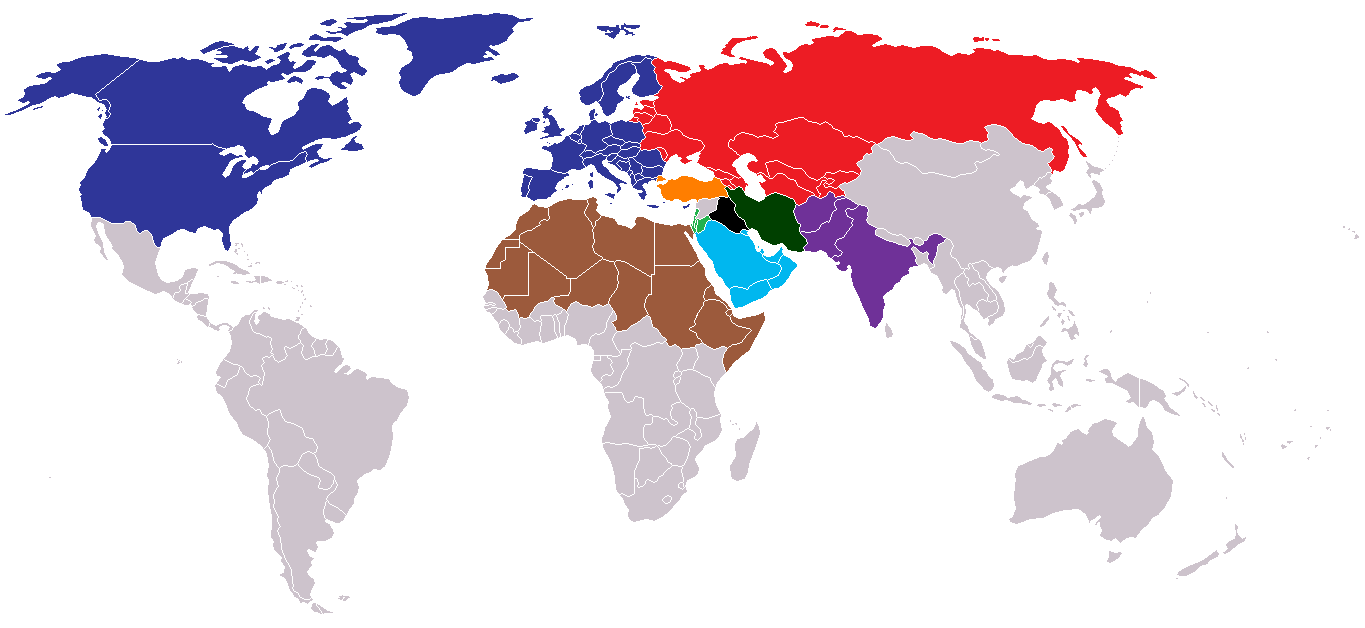
The eight directorates of the Quds Force's operations according to David Dionisi

The force is described as "active in dozens of countries." According to former U.S. Army intelligence officer David Dionisi, the Quds Force is organized into eight different directorates based on geographic location:

- Western countries (excluding Turkey, including the former Eastern Bloc)
- Former Soviet Union
- Iraq
- Afghanistan, Pakistan, and India
- Israel, Lebanon, and Jordan
- Turkey
- North Africa
- Arabian Peninsula

According to journalist Dexter Filkins, the force's members are "divided between combatants and those who train and oversee foreign assets," and the force is divided into branches focusing on "intelligence, finance, foreign languages, politics, sabotage, and special operations." Members are chosen both for their skill and "allegiance to the doctrine of the Islamic Revolution."

In American Hiroshima: The Reasons Why and a Call to Strengthen America's Democracy, Dionisi asserts that the Iranian Quds Force headquarters for operations in Iraq was moved in 2004 to the Iran–Iraq border in order to better supervise activities in Iraq. The Quds Force also operates a base in the former compound of the U.S. embassy, which was overrun in 1979.

According to Filkins and American General Stanley A. McChrystal, it was the Quds Force that "flooded" Iraq with "explosively formed projectiles" which fire a molten copper slug able to penetrate armor, and which accounted for "nearly 20%" of American combat deaths in Iraq (i.e. hundreds of soldiers). In September 2007, a few years after the publication of American Hiroshima, General David Petraeus reported to Congress that the Quds Force had left Iraq. Petraeus said, "The Quds Force itself, we believe, by and large, those individuals have been pulled out of the country, as have the Lebanese Hezbollah trainers that were being used to augment that activity."

On 7 July 2008, journalist Seymour Hersh wrote an article in The New Yorker revealing that President Bush had signed a Presidential Finding authorizing the CIA and Joint Special Operations Command to conduct cross-border paramilitary operations from Iraq and Afghanistan into Iran. These operations would be against the Quds Force and "high-value targets." "The Finding was focused on undermining Iran's nuclear ambitions and trying to undermine the government through regime change," a person familiar with its contents said, and involved "working with opposition groups."

=== Subdivisions ===
According to an Iraqi intelligence study which discusses the foundation of the Quds Force after the end of the Iran–Iraq War and Khomeini's death, the IRGC-QF has four main command centers to direct its intelligence and operational activities in neighboring countries in order to achieve its goals in these countries:

- Ramadan Headquarters (1st Corps) is responsible for Iraq, led formerly by Brigadier-Generals Hassan Danaeifar and Iraj Masjedi,
- Nabi Al-Akram Command Center (2nd Corps) is dedicated to Pakistan,
- Al-Hamzah Command Center (3rd Corps) is focused on Turkey and the Kurdish issue,
- Al-Ansar Command Center (4th Corps) is intended for Afghanistan and Central Asia, led formerly by General Hossein Musavi and Colonel Hasan Mortezavi.

Besides these main command centers, the document indicates that there are also six corps for each country or area in which they operate:

- Fifth Corps, Turkish territory,
- Sixth Corps, Persian Gulf countries and Arabian Peninsula, led in the 1990s by Brigadier-General Ahmad Sherifi, who allegedly orchestrated the 1996 Khobar Towers bombing of a U.S. Air Force base in Saudi Arabia, and more recently led by Brigadier-General Abdolreza Shahlaei, responsible for the provision of arms and training to the Yemeni Houthi movement,
- Seventh Corps, also known as Lebanon Corps, responsible for Lebanon and Syria, including managing Iran's ties to Hezbollah, led formerly by Brigadier-Generals Hossein Dehghan, Mohammad Hejazi and Mohammad Reza Zahedi,
  - The Palestine Division, led by Brigadier-General Saeed Izadi, responsible for Iran's assistance to Hamas and the Palestinian Islamic Jihad,
    - The Abu Jihad Foreign Operations Unit (named after Khalil al-Wazir), which is jointly led by Palestinian militants and Iranian intelligence operatives, overseeing the smuggling and production of improvised explosive devices and construction of tunnel warfare networks within the West Bank and Gaza Strip,
- Eighth Corps, Bosnia and Herzegovina, led in the 1990s by Brigadier-Generals Hossein Allahkaram and Mohammad Reza Naqdi,
- Ninth Corps, Europe, the Americas and East Asian countries,
- Tenth Corps, Africa, led in the 1990s by Brigadier-General Mohammad Bagher Zolghadr.

=== Size ===
The size of the Quds Force is classified and unknown. In 2007, Mahan Abedin of Center for the Study of Terrorism said that Quds Force numbers no more than 2,000 people, with 800 core operatives. Scott Shane, who interviewed several American scholars later that year, wrote that estimates range from 3,000 to 50,000. In 2013, Dexter Filkins wrote that the Quds Force has 10,000–20,000 members, "divided between combatants and those who train and oversee foreign assets". The 2020 edition of The Military Balance, published by the International Institute of Strategic Studies (IISS), estimated that the force has about 5,000 personnel.

In 2020, Jack Watling of the Royal United Services Institute estimated the Quds Force had the "divisional strength military formation" of approximately 17,000 to 21,000 members, split regionally.

=== Financing ===
Companies controlled by the Quds Force maintain banking relationships with the Bank of Kunlun, a subsidiary of the China National Petroleum Corporation.

The Quds Force has been involved in lucrative drug smuggling operations between Afghanistan and Iran, leveraging connections with South American drug cartels. It has also been involved in smuggling to Lebanon.

The Quds Force Corps budget was leaked in a hack in February 2024 to be $7,700 billion toman.

=== Outside analysis ===
While it reports directly to the supreme leader, there are debates over how independently Quds Force operates.

Mahan Abedin, director of research at the London-based Center for the Study of Terrorism (and editor of Islamism Digest), believes the unit is not independent: "Quds Force, although it's a highly specialized department, it is subject to strict, iron-clad military discipline. It's completely controlled by the military hierarchy of the IRGC, and the IRGC is very tightly controlled by the highest levels of the administration in Iran."

According to a Los Angeles Times report, in Abedin's view, "[I]t's a very capable force—their people are extremely talented, [and] they tend to be the best people in the IRGC".

== Activities ==
The Quds Force trains and equips foreign Islamic revolutionary groups around the Middle East. Paramilitary instruction typically occurs in Iran or Sudan. Foreign recruits are transported from their home countries to Iran to receive training. The Quds Force sometimes plays a more direct role in the military operations of the forces it trains, including pre-attack planning and other operation-specific military advice.

=== Afghanistan ===
Since 1979, Iran had supported the Shi'a Hezbe Wahdat forces against the Afghan government of Mohammad Najibullah. When Najibullah stepped down as President in 1992, Iran continued supporting Hezbe Wahdat against other Afghan militia groups. When the Taliban took over Afghanistan in 1996, Hezbe Wahdat had lost its founder and main leader, Abdul Ali Mazari, so the group joined Ahmad Shah Massoud's Northern Alliance. Iran began supporting the Northern Alliance against the Taliban, who were backed by Pakistan and the Arab world. In 1999, after several Iranian diplomats were killed by the Taliban in Mazar-e Sharif, Iran nearly got into a war with the Taliban. The Quds Force reportedly fought alongside the United States and the Northern Alliance in the Battle for Herat. However, in recent years Iran is accused of helping and training the Taliban insurgents against the NATO-backed Karzai administration. Iranian-made weapons, including powerful explosive devices are often found inside Afghanistan.

We did interdict a shipment, without question the Revolutionary Guard's core Quds Force, through a known Taliban facilitator. Three of the individuals were killed... Iranians certainly view as making life more difficult for us if Afghanistan is unstable. We don't have that kind of relationship with the Iranians. That's why I am particularly troubled by the interception of weapons coming from Iran. But we know that it's more than weapons; it's money; it's also according to some reports, training at Iranian camps as well.

— General David Petraeus

In March 2012, Najibullah Kabuli, leader of the National Participation Front (NPF) of Afghanistan, accused three senior leaders of Iran's Revolutionary Guards of plotting to assassinate him. Some members of the Afghan Parliament accuses Iran of setting up Taliban bases in several Iranian cities, and that "Iran is directly involved in fanning ethnic, linguistic and sectarian tensions in Afghanistan." There are reports about Iran's Revolutionary Guards training Afghans inside Iran to carry out terrorist attacks in Afghanistan.

Currently, the Revolutionary Guards recruit young people for terrorist activities in Afghanistan and try to revive the Hezb-i-Islami Afghanistan led by Gulbadin Hekmatyar and Taliban groups

— Syed Kamal, a self-confessed agent for Iran's Revolutionary Guards and member of Sipah-i-Mohmmad

=== India ===
Following an attack on an Israeli diplomat in India in February 2012, Delhi Police contended that the IRGC had some involvement. This was subsequently confirmed in July 2012, after a report by the Delhi Police found evidence that members of IRGC had been involved in the 13 February bomb attack in the capital.

=== United States ===
On 11 October 2011, the Obama Administration revealed the United States Government's allegations that the Quds Force was involved with the plot to assassinate Saudi Arabia's Ambassador to the United States Adel al-Jubeir, which also entailed plans to bomb the Israeli and Saudi embassies located in Washington, D.C.

In August 2022, plans to assassinate former US government officials John Bolton and Mike Pompeo were uncovered by US federal prosecutors, likely in retaliation for the January 2020 death of Soleimani.

=== South America ===
It has been reported that Iran has been increasing its presence in Latin America through Venezuela. Little is known publicly what their objectives are in the region, but in 2009, Defense Secretary Robert Gates denounced Iran for meddling in "subversive activities" using Quds Forces. However, Iran claims it is merely "ensuring the survival of the regime" by propagating regional influence.

Juan Guaidó, President of the National Assembly of Venezuela, accused Nicolás Maduro in January 2020 of allowing Qasem Soleimani and his Quds Forces to incorporate their sanctioned banks and their companies in Venezuela. Guaidó also said that Soleimani "led a criminal and terrorist structure in Iran that for years caused pain to his people and destabilized the Middle East, just as Abu Mahdi al-Muhandis did with Hezbollah."

=== Iraq ===
The Quds Force has been described as the Iranian "unit deployed to challenge the United States presence" in Iraq following the U.S. invasion of that country, which put "165,000 American troops along Iran's western border," adding to the American troops already in Iran's eastern neighbor Afghanistan.

The force established Unit 3800 with the aid of Hezbollah and "operated throughout Iraq, arming, aiding, and abetting Shiite militias"—i.e., the Supreme Council for Islamic Revolution in Iraq, Dawa, and the Mahdi Army—"all" of which "had close ties to Iran, some dating back decades" as part of their struggle against Saddam Hussein's oppressive Arab nationalist regime. The Quds Force trained the Shiite militias in the use of roadside bombs, known as IEDs, that were the largest cause of U.S. military deaths in Iraq.

In November 2006, with sectarian violence in Iraq increasing, U.S. General John Abizaid accused the Quds Force of supporting "Shi'a death squads", while the government of Iran was pledging support in stabilization. Similarly, in July 2007, Major General Kevin Bergner of the U.S. Army alleged that members of the Quds Force aided in the planning of a raid on U.S. forces in the Iraqi city of Karbala in January 2007.

Former CIA officer Robert Baer asserts the Quds Force uses couriers for all sensitive communications.

==== 2006 detainment in Iraq ====
On 24 December 2006, The New York Times reported that at least four Iranians had been captured by American troops in Iraq in the previous few days. According to the article, the U.S. government suspected that two of them were members of Quds Force, which would be some of the first physical proof of Quds Force activity in Iraq. According to The Pentagon, the alleged Quds Force members were "involved in the transfer of IED technologies from Iran to Iraq." The two men had entered Iraq legally, although they were not accredited diplomats. Iraqi officials believed that the evidence against the men was only circumstantial, but on 29 December, and under U.S. pressure, the Iraqi government ordered the men to leave Iraq. They were driven back to Iran that day. In mid-January 2007 it was reported that the two alleged Quds force officers seized by American forces were Brig. Gen. Mohsen Chizari and Col. Abu Amad Davari. According to The Washington Post. Chizari is the third highest officer of Quds Force, making him the allegedly highest-ranked Iranian to ever be held by the United States.

==== New York Sun report ====
The New York Sun reported that the documents described the Quds Force as not only cooperating with Shi'a death squads, but also with fighters related to al-Qaeda and Ansar al-Sunna. It said that the Quds Force had studied the Iraq situation in a similar manner to the U.S. Iraq Study Group, and had concluded that they must increase efforts with Sunni and Shiite groups in order to counter the influence of Sunni states.

==== U.S. raid on Iranian liaison office ====
On 11 January 2007, U.S. forces raided and detained five employees of the Iranian liaison office in Erbil, Iraq. The U.S. military said the five detainees were connected to the Quds Force. The operation drew protests from the regional Kurdish government while the Russian government called the detainments unacceptable.

Alireza Nourizadeh, a political analyst at Voice of America, stated that their arrests were causing concern in Iranian intelligence because the five alleged officials were knowledgeable of a wide range of Quds Force and Iranian activities in Iraq. According to American ambassador Zalmay Khalilzad, one of the men in custody was Quds Force's director of operations.

Iranian and Iraqi officials maintained that the detained men were part of a diplomatic mission in the city of Erbil, Iraq. The five Iranian detainees were still being held at a U.S. prison in Iraq as of 8 July 2007. The U.S. said they were "still being interrogated" and that it had "no plans to free them while they are seen as a security risk in Iraq." Iran said that the detainees were "kidnapped diplomats" and that they were "held as hostages."

On 9 July 2009, the five detainees were released from U.S. custody to Iraqi officials.

==== Allegations of involvement in Karbala attack ====
On 20 January 2007, a group of gunmen attacked the Karbala Provincial Joint Coordination Center in Karbala, captured four American soldiers, and subsequently killed them. The attackers passed through an Iraqi checkpoint at around 5 pm, a total of five black GMC Suburbans, similar to those driven by U.S. security and diplomatic officials. They were also wearing American military uniforms and spoke fluent English. Because of the sophistication of the attack, some analysts have suggested that only a group like the Quds Force would be able to plan and carry out such an action. Former CIA officer Robert Baer also suggested that the five Americans were killed by the Quds Force in revenge for the Americans holding five Iranians since the 11 January raid in Irbil. It was reported that the U.S. military is investigating whether or not the attackers were trained by Iranian officials; however, no evidence besides the sophistication of the attack has yet been presented.

On 2 July 2007, the U.S. military said that information from captured Hezbollah fighter Ali Musa Daqduq established a link between the Quds Force and the Karbala raid. The U.S. military claims Daqduq worked as a liaison between Quds force operatives and the Shia group that carried out the raid. According to the United States, Daqduq said that the Shia group "could not have conducted this complex operation without the support and direction of the Quds force".

==== Allegations of support for Iraqi militants ====
In June 2007, U.S. General Ray Odierno asserted that Iranian support for these Shia militia increased as the United States itself implemented the 2007 "troop surge". Two different studies have maintained that approximately half of all foreign insurgents entering Iraq come from Saudi Arabia.

In December 2009 evidence uncovered during an investigation by The Guardian newspaper and Guardian Films linked the Quds Force to the kidnappings of five Britons from a government ministry building in Baghdad in 2007. Four of the hostages, Jason Creswell, Jason Swindlehurst, Alec Maclachlan, and Alan McMenemy, were killed. Peter Moore was released on 30 December 2009. The investigation uncovered evidence that Moore, 37, a computer expert from Lincoln was targeted because he was installing a system for the Iraqi Government that would show how a vast amount of international aid was diverted to Iran's militia groups in Iraq. One of the alleged groups funded by the Quds force directly is the Righteous League, which emerged in 2006 and has stayed largely in the shadows as a proxy of the Quds Force. Shia cleric and leading figure of the Righteous League, Qais al-Khazali, was handed over by the U.S. military for release by the Iraqi government on 29 December 2009 as part of the deal that led to the release of Moore.

==== Allegations by U.S. President Bush ====
In a 14 February 2007 news conference U.S. President George W. Bush reiterated his claim that the Quds Force was causing unrest in Iraq, stating:

I can say with certainty that the Quds force, a part of the Iranian government, has provided these sophisticated IEDs that have harmed our troops. And I'd like to repeat, I do not know whether or not the Quds Force was ordered from the top echelons of government. But my point is what's worse – them ordering it and it happening, or them not ordering it and it happening? And so we will continue to protect our troops. ... to say it [this claim] is provoking Iran is just a wrong way to characterize the Commander-in-Chief's decision to do what is necessary to protect our soldiers in harm's way. And I will continue to do so. ... Whether Ahmadinejad ordered the Quds force to do this, I don't think we know. But we do know that they're there, and I intend to do something about it. And I've asked our commanders to do something about it. And we're going to protect our troops. ... I don't think we know who picked up the phone and said to the Quds Force, go do this, but we know it's a vital part of the Iranian government. ...What matters is, is that we're responding. The idea that somehow we're manufacturing the idea that the Iranians are providing IEDs is preposterous. ... My job is to protect our troops. And when we find devices that are in that country that are hurting our troops, we're going to do something about it, pure and simple. ... does this mean you're trying to have a pretext for war? No. It means I'm trying to protect our troops.

Mohsen Sazegara, who was a high-ranking Tehran official before turning against the government, has argued that Ahmadinejad does not control the Guards outside of Iran. "Not only the foreign ministry of Iran; even the president does not know what the Revolutionary Guards does outside of Iran. They directly report to the leader", he said, referring to Grand Ayatollah Ali Khamenei. Although Ali Khamenei is the ultimate person in charge of the Quds Force, George Bush did not mention him. According to Richard Clarke, "Quds force reports directly to the Supreme Ayatollah, through the commander-in-chief of the revolutionary guards."

==== Detainment of alleged bomb smuggler ====
On 20 September 2007, the U.S. military arrested an Iranian during a raid on a hotel in Sulaimaniyah, a city in the Kurdish-controlled north. The military accused the Iranian of being a member of the elite Quds Force and smuggling powerful roadside bombs, including armor-piercing explosively formed penetrators, into Iraq. The military said intelligence reports asserted the suspect was involved in the infiltration and training of foreign fighters into Iraq as well.

On 22 September 2007, Iraqi President Jalal Talabani criticized the United States for arresting the Iranian and called for his immediate release. Talabani argued he is a civil servant who was on an official trade mission in the Kurdish Region and stated Iraqi and Kurdish regional government representatives were aware of the man's presence in the country. "I express to you our outrage for these American forces arresting this Iranian civil official visitor without informing or cooperating with the government of the Kurdistan region, which means insult and disregard for its rights", Talabani wrote in a "letter of resentment" to Ryan Crocker, U.S. ambassador to Iraq, and Gen. David Petraeus.

==== Allegations of 2007 market attack ====
On 24 November 2007, US military officials accused an Iranian special group of placing a bomb in a bird box that blew up at a popular animal market in central Baghdad. "The group's purpose was to make it appear Al Qaeda in Iraq was responsible for the attack", Admiral Smith said. He further emphasized there was "no evidence Iran ordered the attack". In May 2008, Iraq said it had no evidence that Iran was supporting militants on Iraqi soil. Al-Sadr spokesman Al-Ubaydi said the presence of Iranian weapons in Iraq is "quite normal," since "they are bought and sold and any party can buy them."

==== Allegations of ties to Al-Qaeda ====
According to reports produced by Agence France-Presse (AFP), The Jerusalem Post, and Al Arabiya, at the request of a member of the United States' House Permanent Select Committee on Intelligence, in 2011 Congressional counter-terrorism advisor Michael S. Smith II of Kronos Advisory, LLC produced a report on Iran's alleged ties to Al-Qaeda that was distributed to members of the Congressional Anti-Terrorism Caucus. Titled "The al-Qa'ida-Qods Force Nexus: Scratching the Surface of a Known Unknown", a redacted version of Smith's report is available online via the blog site owned by American military geostrategist and The Pentagon's New Map author Thomas P.M. Barnett. The report's Issue Summary section explains: "This report focuses on the history of Iran's relationship with al-Qa'ida, and briefly addresses potential implications of these ties. Additionally, its author provides a list of recommended action items for Members of the United States Congress, as well as a list of questions that may help Members develop a better understanding of this issue through interactions with defense and intelligence officials". A member of the Quds Force was alleged arrested with 21 other suspects in the attack on the Israeli and United States embassies on 14 March 2012 in Azerbaijan.

==== Combat against Islamic State ====
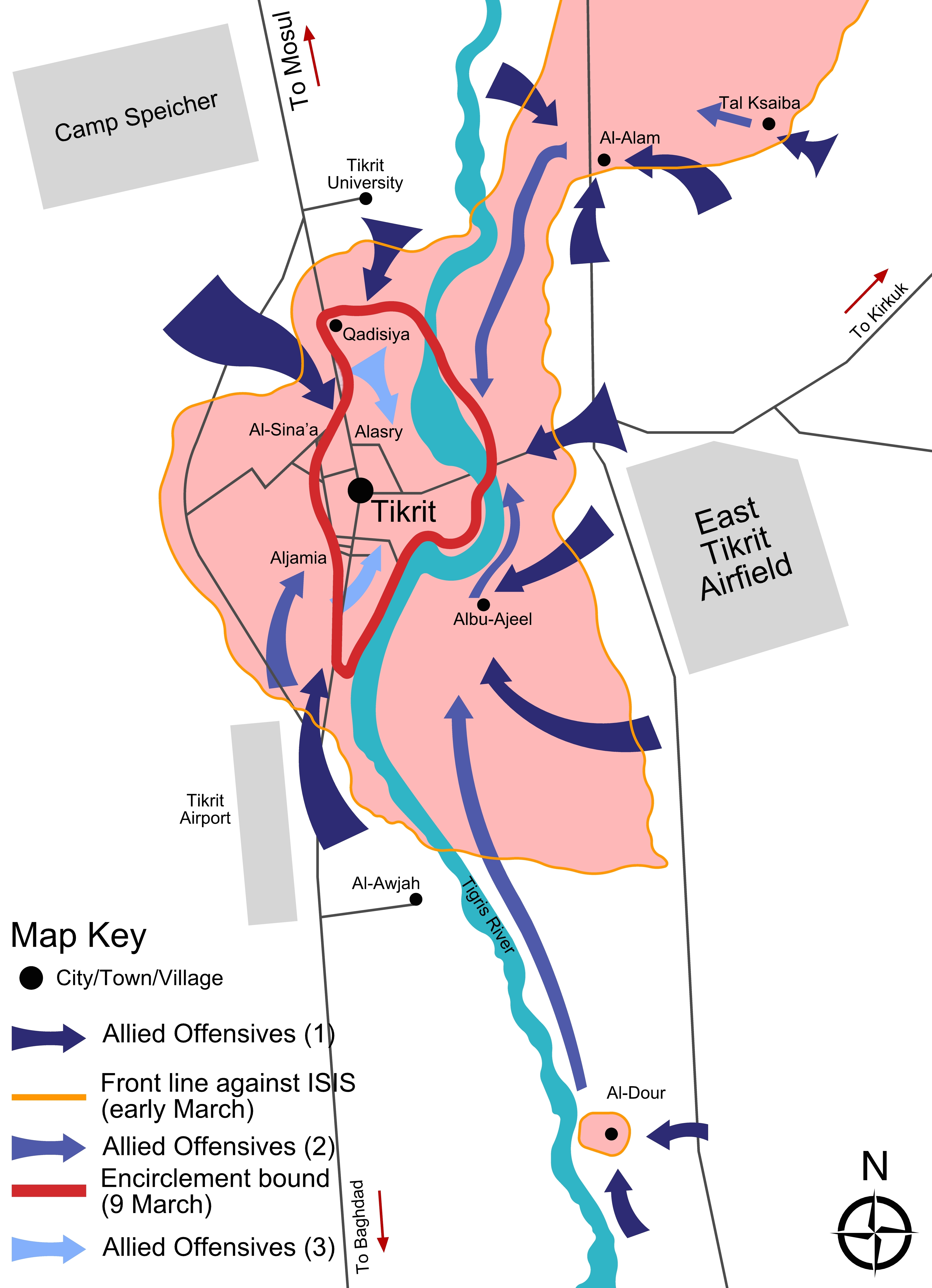
The Quds Force's commander, General Qasem Soleimani, was involved with both the planning as well as the execution of the operation to expel ISIL from Tikrit.

In 2014, Quds Force was deployed into Iraq to lead Iranian action against ISIL. Iran sent three Quds Force battalions to help the Iraqi government repel ISIL's 2014 Northern Iraq offensive. Over 40 officers participated in the Second Battle of Tikrit, including the commander of the force, Gen. Qasem Soleimani who took a leading role in the operation.

==== 2020 drone strike on Qasem Soleimani in Iraq ====
On 3 January 2020, a drone strike approved by United States President Donald Trump at Baghdad International Airport killed General Qasem Soleimani, the head of the Quds Force. He was replaced by General Esmail Qaani

In November 2021 the Commander of the corps went to Iraq for a visit.

=== Lebanon ===
In Lebanon, Quads Force plays an important and ongoing role, mostly by supporting Hezbollah and other groups that are friendly to Iran. Its actions in Lebanon are part of a larger strategy that involves unconventional warfare, intelligence operations, and support for armed groups throughout the Middle East.

One of the main ways the Quds Force is involved in Lebanon is through its close partnership with Hezbollah. It provides Hezbollah with weapons, training, money, and strategic advice through Unit 190, Unit 700, and Unit 18000. This support has helped Hezbollah grow into a powerful military and political group in Lebanon, and a central part of Iran’s efforts to challenge Israel in the region. The Quds Force also provides training for fighters, both in Lebanon and Iran. They help build up military infrastructure, including weapons storage sites in southern Lebanon. These are sometimes located near civilian areas or UN facilities, which increases risks during conflicts.

The Quds Force is also directly involved in planning attacks. For example, a man named Hassan Ali Mahmoud Badir—who worked with both Hezbollah and the Quds Force—was recently killed in Beirut. Reports say he was helping to coordinate attacks between Hamas and Hezbollah, targeting Israeli civilians. This shows how the Quds Force is actively involved in organizing operations, not just offering support from a distance.

Esmail Qaani, the leader of the Quds Force, has visited Lebanon often, especially after the 7 October Hamas attack on Israel. His visits are meant to strengthen cooperation between Iran, Hezbollah, and Palestinian groups. However, even with his involvement, Hezbollah still runs most operations in Lebanon on its own. Lebanon is just one part of the Quds Force’s broader mission. It also supports armed groups in Syria, Iraq, Yemen, and the Palestinian territories. These efforts are part of Iran’s regional strategy to build influence and challenge rival powers, especially Israel and the United States.

In recent months, Israel has carried out strikes to kill Quds Force members and their allies in Lebanon, saying these individuals were planning attacks on civilians. The killing of people like Hassan Badir highlights how directly involved the Quds Force is in planning military operations. The presence of the Quds Force in Lebanon also contributes to regular flare-ups in violence between Hezbollah and Israel. Even when ceasefires are in place, the Quds Force’s actions often lead to violations and renewed clashes, making peace in the region more difficult to achieve.

=== Syria ===
In 2011, the Quds Force deployed to Syria. IRGC Commander Jafari announced on 16 September 2012 that Quds Force "were present" in Syria.

In order to support Assad, the IRGC's Quds Force recruited, funded, and trained two key militias which are led by Quds Force commanders and operate from Iran. These are:

- Liwa Fatemiyoun (a Shia Afghan militia founded in 2013)
- Liwa Zainabiyoun (a Shia Pakistani militia founded in 2015)

Coinciding with the Geneva II Conference on Syria in 2014, Iran boosted its presence in Syria with several "hundred" military specialists, including senior commanders from the Quds Force, according to Iranian sources and security experts. While recently retired senior IRGC commander told that there were at least 60 to 70 Quds force commanders on the ground in Syria at any given time. The primary role of these forces is to gather intelligence and manage the logistics of the battle for the Syrian Government.

In November 2015, the Quds Force conducted a successful rescue mission of a Russian bomber pilot who was shot down by a Turkish fighter jet.

In May 2018, Quds forces on the Syrian-held side of the Golan Heights allegedly fired around 20 projectiles towards Israeli army positions without causing damage or casualties. Israel responded with airstrikes against Iranian bases in Syria. At least twenty-three fighters, among them 18 foreigners, were reportedly killed in the strikes.

In January 2019, the Israel Defense Forces confirmed that it had carried out strikes against Iranian military targets in Syria several hours after a rocket was intercepted over the Golan Heights. The Israeli military claimed in a statement that Quds Force positions were targeted and included a warning to the Syrian military against "attempting to harm Israeli forces or territory."

In April 2021, prominent Syria-based Quds operative Brigadier General Mohammad Reza Fallahzadeh became Quds Deputy Commander.

=== Africa ===
In 2021, the African network was dismantled by the Israeli intelligence agency Mossad.

=== Germany ===
In January 2018, German authorities conducted raids in Baden-Württemberg, North Rhine-Westphalia, Bavaria and Berlin, searching homes and businesses belonging to ten alleged Iranian Quds Force members, suspected of spying on Israeli and Jewish targets.

=== Yemen ===
In 2014, deployed as advisers for the Houthis in the Yemeni Civil War.

== Commanders ==
No.	Portrait	Commander	Took office	Left office	Time in office	Ref.
1	Ahmad Vahidi	Brigadier general Ahmad Vahidi (born 1958)	1988	1998	9–10 years	–
2	Qasem Soleimani	Major general Qasem Soleimani (1957–2020)	21 March 1998	3 January 2020 †	21 years, 288 days	
3	Esmail Qaani	Brigadier general Esmail Qaani (born 1957)	3 January 2020	Incumbent	6 years, 317 days	

=== Deputy Commanders ===
No.	Portrait	Commander	Took office	Left office	Time in office	Ref.
1	Esmail Qaani	Brigadier general Esmail Qaani (born 1957)	21 March 1998	3 January 2020	21 years, 288 days	–
2	Mohammad Hejazi	Brigadier general Mohammad Hejazi (1956–2021)	3 January 2020	18 April 2021 †	1 year, 105 days	–
3	Mohammad Reza Fallahzadeh	Brigadier general Mohammad Reza Fallahzadeh (born 1962)	18 April 2021	Incumbent	5 years, 212 days	–

== Designation as a terrorist organization ==
The United States Department of the Treasury designated the Quds Force under Executive Order 13224 for providing material support to U.S.-designated terrorist organizations on 25 October 2007, prohibiting transactions between the group and U.S. citizens, and freezing any assets under U.S. jurisdiction. Canada designated the Quds Force as a terrorist organization on 17 December 2012. Israel designated the Quds Force as a terrorist organization in March 2015.

On 23 October 2018, the kingdoms of Saudi Arabia and Bahrain, both involved in Saudi Arabian-led intervention in Yemen against Quds Force-backed Houthis, designated the IRGC as a terrorist organization. The designation also included former commander Qasem Soleimani.

In April 2019, the U.S. made the decision to designate the Islamic Revolutionary Guard Corps (IRGC), a foreign military, as a foreign terrorist organization by the State Department under an immigration statute and their maximum pressure campaign. This designation was done over the opposition of the Central Intelligence Agency (CIA) and the Department of Defense (DoD).

On 28 August 2019, when Israel's foreign minister Israel Katz made a visit to the United Kingdom, he asked the UK's foreign minister Dominic Raab to designate the Quds Force as a terrorist organization. The U.S. government's Rewards for Justice Program offers $15 million for information on QF financing.

On 17 January 2026, Argentina designated the Quds Force as a terrorist organization.

=== Sanctions ===
The Quds Force circumvents international sanctions against Iran by forming fake businesses and institutions.

On 1 May 2020, the U.S. Department of the Treasury's Office of Foreign Assets Control (OFAC) designated Iranian-Iraqi national Amir Dianat, associate of Revolutionary Guards Quds Force officials. Dianat, who also known as Amir Abdulazeez Jaafar, has been involved in the Quds Force's efforts to generate revenue and smuggle weapons abroad. The U.S. Department of the Treasury's Office of Foreign Assets Control (OFAC) also designating "Taif" Mineral Mining Services Company, a company owned, controlled, or directed by Dianat.

== Timeline ==
=== 1980s ===
1981
The Irregular Warfare Headquarters is established within the Revolutionary Guards by Defense Minister Mostafa Chamran, in cooperation with Mohammad Montazeri's Department for Islamic Liberation Movements. These groups had the task of carrying out Ayatollah Khomeini's policy of exporting the Islamic revolution abroad, to Shia-majority countries ruled by non-Shia minorities. Elements of the Revolutionary Guards help establish the Shia Islamic Front for the Liberation of Bahrain, as well as the Badr Organization in Iraq to fight against Saddam Hussein.
1982
A contingent of 1,500 Revolutionary Guards, led by Hossein Dehghan and Ali Akbar Mohtashamipur are dispatched to Lebanon's Beqaa Valley to train Hezbollah fighters resisting Israeli aggression. A bomb is detonated inside the Israel Defense Forces Tyre headquarters in November, killing 75 Israeli Shin Bet agents. Hezbollah and the Guards were suspected of orchestrating the attack.
1983
The 1983 US embassy bombing in Beirut and 1983 Beirut barracks bombing kill over 300 American and French soldiers and diplomats, including the CIA's top Middle East analyst and Near East director, Robert Ames, Station Chief Kenneth Haas, James Lewis and most of the Beirut staff of the CIA. American courts have found Hezbollah's chief of operations Imad Mughniyeh and Quds Force General Ali-Reza Asgari responsible for directing the attacks. A second bomb in Tyre kills 28 Israeli soldiers. A bomb detonation inside the U.S. embassy in Kuwait kills 17 Americans. Iraqi Badr Organization military chief Abu Mahdi al-Muhandis and Hezbollah operative Mustafa Badreddine were suspected of carrying out the attack with help from the Guards.
1984
The 1984 US embassy bombing in Beirut by the pro-Iranian Islamic Jihad Organization results in the withdrawal of all U.S. troops from Lebanon.
1988
The Quds Force becomes an independent branch of the Guards, with Ahmad Vahidi as its first commander.

=== 1990s ===
1990
Quds Force Brigadier-General Razi Mousavi is dispatched to Syria. In the following 33 years he headed the Quds Force Logistical Division "Unit 2250", responsible for coordinating Iranian logistical support for Syria's Assad government.
1993
The Quds Force sends more than five) thousand tonnes of arms to the Bosnian Muslims fighting in the Bosnian War. IRGC also supplied trainers and advisers for the Bosnian military and intelligence service. Several dozen Iranian intelligence experts joined the Bosnian Muslim intelligence agency. Robert Baer, a CIA agent stationed in Sarajevo during the war, later claimed that "In Sarajevo, the Bosnian Muslim government is a client of the Iranians . . . If it's a choice between the CIA and the Iranians, they'll take the Iranians any day." By the war's end, public opinion polls showed some 86% of the Bosnian Muslim population expressed a positive attitude toward Iran. Quds Force Major-General Qasem Soleimani was also reported to have personally fought in Bosnia in 1993-94.
1994
The AMIA bombing in Buenos Aires kills 85 Jewish and Israeli citizens. Argentinian courts have accused Quds Force commander Vahidi and Hezbollah commander Mughniyeh of being responsible for directing the attack.
1995
An attack on the Egyptian Embassy in Pakistan (Islamabad) by the Egyptian Islamic Jihad kills 17 people. Former CIA agent Robert Baer claims that Imad Mughniyah, with Quds Force approval, "facilitated the travel" of somebody involved, and that one of his deputies had "provided a stolen Lebanese passport to one of the planners of the bombing".
1996
The Khobar Towers bombing in Saudi Arabia by the Shia group Hezbollah Al-Hejaz kills 19 American soldiers. Quds Force commander Vahidi is implicated in directing the attack.
1997
Qasem Soleimani succeeds Vahidi as head of the Force. Under Soleimani, the Force's modus operandi shifts away from suicide bombings and towards helping allied organizations throughout the Middle East merge militant and state power.
1998
The Force begins supporting the Northern Alliance in its fight against the Taliban in Afghanistan.

=== 2000s ===
2001
The Force cooperates with the United States Army in driving out the Taliban and al-Qaeda from Herat during the U.S. invasion of Afghanistan.
2002
During the Second Intifada, Soleimani and Mughniyeh oversee the smuggling of weapons to the Palestinian Hamas and Islamic Jihad factions, according to Anis al-Naqqash.
2004
The Iraqi insurgency against U.S. occupation begins. The Quds Force provides the insurgents with weapons, most notably explosively formed penetrators (EFPs) or roadside bombs, used to devastating effect against coalition forces and Blackwater mercenaries, as in the 2004 Fallujah ambush and 2004 Good Friday ambush.
2006
In July and August, Soleimani was part of the three-man operational command in Beirut that led all of Hezbollah operations in the war against Israel, alongside Hezbollah Secretary-General Hassan Nasrallah and Mughniyeh.
2007
On 20 January, Iraqi Shia militia Asa'ib Ahl al-Haq, with training provided in Iran by Quds Force General Abdolreza Shahlaei and Hezbollah sniper network leader Ali Musa Daqduq, launches a successful commando operation against the U.S. Army's Karbala Joint Coordination headquarters, infiltrating it and killing five American soldiers. On the same day, twenty more American soldiers were killed by other insurgents throughout Iraq, making it the third worst day for U.S. troops in the entire war.
2009
According to Hamas leader Ismail Haniyeh, Soleimani was present at the Palestinian Joint Operations Room in Damascus, Syria throughout January, overseeing operations against the Israeli Army during the 2008-2009 Gaza War.

=== 2010s ===
2012
The Quds Force oversees the formation and training of the pro-Assad National Defence Forces in the Syrian Civil War, modeled on the Basij of Iran.
2013
The Force provides further financial, military, logistical and personnel support to Assad, and oversees the formation and training of the Liwa Fatemiyoun and Liwa Zainebiyoun militias consisting of Afghan and Pakistani Shias, to fight in Syria, as well as of Hezbollah fighters from Lebanon.
2014
The Force oversees the merger of various Iraqi Shia militias into the Popular Mobilization Forces fighting on the side of the Iraqi government against the Islamic State of Iraq and the Levant. The PMF is led by Hadi al-Amiri and Abu Mahdi al-Muhandis, two Badr Organization leaders with ties το Iran since the 1980s. The Force also supplies arms to Kurdish Peshmerga fighting the Islamic State in Iraqi Kurdistan.
2015
Soleimani personally commands victorious operations against the Islamic State such as the Second Battle of Tikrit in Iraq and the Aleppo offensive (October–December 2015). He also personally leads a commando operation to rescue a downed Russian pilot inside enemy territory.
2016
Soleimani completes the encirclement of Aleppo in Syria and leads the liberation of Fallujah in Iraq.
2017
Soleimani and Syrian Arab Army General Suheil al-Hassan lead the final successful 2017 Abu Kamal offensive against the Islamic State in Syria.
2018
Quds Force General Abdolreza Shahlaei is dispatched to Yemen in order to coordinate the provision of Iranian military-logistical assistance to the Houthi Movement fighting against a Saudi and Emirati-led coalition in the Yemeni Civil War.

=== 2020s ===
2020
Soleimani and Abu Mahdi al-Muhandis are assassinated in Baghdad, Iraq. Brigadier-General Esmail Qaani, Soleimani's long-time deputy, becomes head of the Quds Force.
2023
Razi Mousavi is killed in Damascus, Syria.: Quds force operatives arrested in Cyprus.
2024
Brigadier-General Mohammad Reza Zahedi, alleged head of the Quds Force's Syria-Lebanon operations, is assassinated in an Israeli F-35 strike on the Iranian Embassy building in Damascus.

== See also ==
- Intelligence Organization of the Islamic Revolutionary Guard Corps
- CIA Special Activities Center
- Unit 190
- Unit 340
- Unit 400
- Unit 840
- Unit 2250
- Unit 18000
