= Economic determinism =

Theory that all societal relationships are based on economic relationships

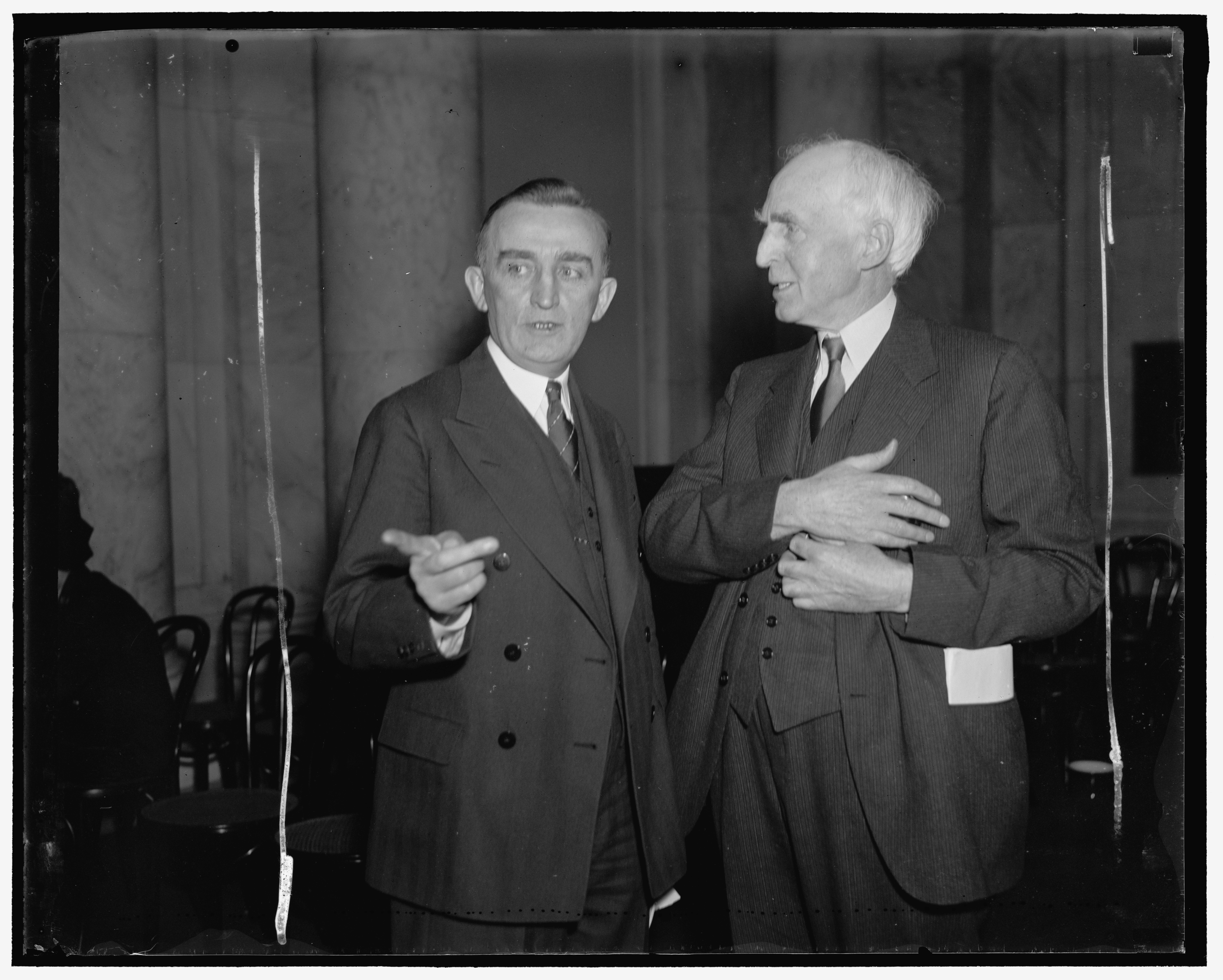
Dr. Charles A. Beard, (right) before testifying in defense of the O'Mahoney Corporation Licensing Bill, which, if passed, would require corporations dealing in interstate commerce to comply with specified standards to acquire a federal license. Senator Joseph O'Mahoney, author of the bill and Chairman of the Committee, on left

Economic determinism is a socioeconomic theory that economic relationships (such as being an owner or capitalist or being a worker or proletarian) are the foundation upon which all other societal and political arrangements in society are based. The theory stresses that societies are divided into competing economic classes whose relative political power is determined by the nature of the economic system.

In the writing of American history the term is associated with historian Charles A. Beard (1874–1948), who was not a Marxist but who emphasized the long-term political contest between bankers and business interest on the one hand, and agrarian interests on the other.

== Relation to Marxist philosophy ==
According to Marx, each social mode of production produces the material conditions of its reproduction. Otherwise said, it is the ideology that is responsible for grounding secondary civil services such as politics, legislature, and even culture to an extent. Roughly speaking, ideology is the guiding influence of the mode of production, and without it, difficulties would theoretically arise with reproduction. Marx did not believe that the same economic rules governed all of history, but that each new era brought with it new economic factors. Furthermore, Marx and Engels are said to have believed, should a revolutionary force change the mode of production, the dominant class will immediately set out to create a new society to protect this new economic order. In the modernity of their era, Marx and Engels felt the propertied class had essentially accomplished the establishment of a new societal and economic order, instinctively creating a society protective of their capitalist interests. They made this statement to the Bourgeoisie in the Communist Manifesto:

Your very ideas are but the outgrowth of conditions of your bourgeois production and bourgeois property, just as your jurisprudence is but the will of your class, made into law for all, a will whose essential character and direction are determined by the economic conditions of the existence of your class.

Marx also argued that the same ideas could not grow out of just any economic system: "Don Quixote long ago paid the penalty for wrongly imagining that knight-errantry was compatible with all economical forms of society."

Other Marxists and Marx-scholars—including Eduard Bernstein, Gerald Hubmann, György Lukács, Antonio Gramsci, Louis Althusser, Maurice Godelier, Franz Jakubowski, Edward P. Thompson and Michael Löwy—completely reject the interpretation of Marx and Engels as "economic determinists". They claim this idea is based on a poor and selective reading of Marx and Engels' work. They argue that this interpretation originated in the early years of the Second International and was popularised by Paul Lafargue and Nikolai Bukharin, among others. They refer to the disclaimers by Engels to the effect that while Marx and himself had focused a lot on the economic aspects, they were very aware that this did not in fact constitute the totality of society or of social life. In Socialism: Utopian and Scientific, Engels notes how the same material conditions and class situation led to different political situations in Britain as that society tried to adapt to the results of the French Revolution and other external events. Richard Wolff also notes that Marx studied things he thought under appreciated by mainstream academia, but did not proclaim or think their theories to be irrelevant.

== Notable economic determinists ==
American geostrategist Thomas P. M. Barnett describes himself as an economic determinist in his book The Pentagon's New Map. Maurice Rea Davie describes William Graham Sumner as an economic determinist, albeit not of the Marxian variety, in his book about the former social scientist.

== See also ==
- Biocultural evolution
- Communism
- Critique of political economy
- Dialectical materialism
- Parametric determinism
- Philosophy of history
