= Hasan Irlu =

Iranian diplomat (1959–2021)

Sardar Hasan Irlu
- حسن ایرلو
- Irlu in 2020

Iranian ambassador to Yemen
- In office 17 October 2020 – 20 December 2021
- Preceded by: Hasan Alizadeh
- Succeeded by: Ali Mohamed Ramadani

Personal details
- Born: 1959 Ray, Imperial State of Iran
- Died: 20 December 2021 (aged 61–62) Tehran, Iran

Military service
- Branch/service: Islamic Revolutionary Guard Corps
- Years of service: 1979–2021
- Commands: Quds Force
- Battles/wars: Iran–Iraq War

Hasan Irlu (Persian: حسن ایرلو; 1959 – 20 December 2021) was an Iranian diplomat. He served as the Iranian ambassador to Houthi-controlled Yemen from 2020 to 2021. He was a former member of the IRGC's Quds Force, who became the head of its Yemen operations in Iran at the request of Qasem Soleimani.

== Early life ==
Hasan Irlu was born in the city of Ray, in Tehran Province, where he completed his primary studies in Tehran in the Dolab Gate area, then completed his undergraduate studies at the University of the Ministry of Foreign Affairs in the Department of International Relations to obtain a doctorate and start his work with the Ministry of Foreign Affairs.

== Move to Yemen ==
On 17 October 2020, Iran posted Irlu as its ambassador in Sanaa. On 8 December 2020, the United States placed Hassan Irlu under terrorism-related sanctions under Executive Order 13224.

== COVID-19 infection and death ==
On 21 December 2021, the Iranian Ministry of Foreign Affairs announced that its envoy to the Houthi militia had died after he returned to the country at the end of last week in poor health after contracting COVID-19. The ministry said in a statement issued by the Islamic Republic News Agency (IRNA), that the Iranian ambassador to the National Salvation Government in Yemen, Hasan Irlu, died of infection with the coronavirus, despite medical follow-up. Irlu had been evacuated from Sanaa three days earlier on an Iraqi medical evacuation plane. Official Iranian obituaries said that Hasan Irlu was one of the leaders of the resistance and was a courageous leader, describing him as a martyr who was martyred while performing his mission. Saeed Khatibzadeh, the spokesman for the Ministry of Foreign Affairs of Iran, was quoted as describing Irlu as a "martyr" and a "chemical warfare veteran" of the Iran-Iraq war and contracted the coronavirus at the embassy and died at dawn after returning in unfavorable conditions. The deputy commander of the IRGC, Ali Fadavi, also named him as a "fighter in the resistance front" accused the United States and its allies of delaying Irlu's evacuation from Sanaa. He had been suffering from respiratory problems because of his exposure to chemical weapons when he was fighting in the Iran-Iraq war.

== Attributing him to Abdolreza Shahlai ==
IRNA wrote in a report that it later removed from its website that Irlu was the same individual as Abdulreza Shahlai. However, the US State Department confirmed that they were two different people and the reward for the arrest of Abdulreza Shahlai still stands.
