= Abdolreza Shahlaei =

Iranian military officer (born c. 1957)

- Born: c. 1957 (age 68–69); Imperial State of Iran
- Military career
- Allegiance: Iran
- Branch: Islamic Revolutionary Guard Corps
- Service years: 1980–present
- Rank: Brigadier general
- Nicknames: Hajj Yusef; Yusuf Abu-al-Karkh
- Unit: Quds Force
- Conflicts: Yemeni Civil War

Abdolreza Shahlaei (born c. 1957; Persian: عبدالرضا شهلایی) is an Iranian military officer who serves as a high-ranking commander of the Quds Force of the Islamic Revolutionary Guard Corps.

== Designation as a terrorist by the US ==
Shahlaei is classified by the US government as a terrorist for his funding of terror groups and his links to attacks on US troops in Iraq, including a 2007 raid that killed five US soldiers in Karbala. Other alleged attacks led by Shahlaei include a failed assassination attempt on the Saudi ambassador in Washington DC, Adel Al-Jubeir. As such, the US State Department has put a US$15 million bounty on Shahlaei, through the Rewards for Justice Program, for information leading to his whereabouts.

== Iran–Iraq War ==
He was one of the commanders of the Ramazan Base during the Iran–Iraq War, responsible for operations outside Iran, and after the fall of Saddam Hussein in 2003, he went to Iraq with Mohammad Jafari Sahraroudi to plan operations against U.S. and coalition forces. No record of Abdolreza Shahlaei in the Ramazan Base has been published or made public, and even in the memoirs of the war commanders, the published materials about wartime operations, and the references to all the 57 different units of the IRGC in the war, Abdolreza Shahlaei's name does not appear. Even in Ali Khamenei's meetings with the commanders of the Revolutionary Guards, no photograph of him can be found.

== 2007 Karbala raid ==
According to the United States, Abdolreza Shahlaei is one of the most active commanders of the IRGC-QF in the Middle East and has been planning and funding operations to kill U.S. forces for years.

U.S. defense and intelligence officials say he is on the move from Afghanistan to Iraq and from Syria to Yemen, planning and acting against U.S. military and targets. Shahlai is accused of being the main organizer of the January 20, 2007, attack on the U.S. Army's Joint Coordinating Headquarters in Karbala, which killed five U.S. service members and wounded three others. On that day, a total of at least 24 U.S. soldiers were killed in various parts of Iraq in 24 hours, a number of whom were targeted by Iranian-backed militias—the bloodiest day for American troops during the entire Iraq War.

== Assistance to Hamas ==
As the Quds Force deputy commander, Shahlaei, together with then Intelligence Minister of Iran Gholam-Hossein Mohseni-Ejei, met with a Hamas delegation headed by Khaled Meshal and Musa Abu Marzouk in Tehran in May 2008. After this meeting, there were reports that Iran increased its support to Hamas to $150 million annually. It was allegedly transferred to Gaza via the Damascus branch of Bank Melli, a bank associated with the IRGC.

== 2020 assassination attempt by the US ==
On the night of 3 January 2020, the US military attempted to assassinate Shahlaei via drone strike in conjunction with the assassination of the head of the Quds Force Qasem Soleimani in the Baghdad International Airport airstrike. The drone strike in Sana'a, where Shahlaei was based, failed to kill him but did lead to the death of lower-ranked IRGC member Mostafa Mohammad Mirzaei. This is the first combat death the Quds Force has acknowledged in Yemen.

On 10 January, the US State Department admitted to the attempted assassination of Shahlaei but did not announce it on the same date as the Soleimani assassination because the Shahlaei assassination was unsuccessful. This led to speculation the 3 January drone strikes were wider decapitation hits aimed at taking out the Quds Force leadership.

== Death rumor ==
An Islamic Republic News Agency report initially called COVID-19 victim Hasan Irlu a repatriated Qods Corps officer and Iranian envoy to Yemen, Shahlaei.

== See also ==
- List of fugitives from justice who disappeared
- List of assassinations by the United States
- USA kill or capture strategy in Iraq
- Assassination of Qasem Soleimani
