= Alireza Nader =

International Policy Analyst

Alireza Nader (Persian: علیرضا نادر) is an International Policy Analyst at the Rand Corporation and author of a number of reports for the Rand Corporation on Iran. He subsequently worked as an advisor to Anti-Defamation League (ADL). He currently serves on the ADL's Task Force to Protect Minority Communities of Middle East. He has given interviews for BBC Arabic, BBC Persian, Voice of America. He has also given testimony on human rights abuses in Iran before the United States House Committee on Foreign Affairs, Subcommittee on The Middle East and South Asia.

He has a M.A. in international affairs from The George Washington University; a Bachelor of Arts in political science from University of California, Santa Barbara.
