= Michael S. Smith II =

American counterterrorist

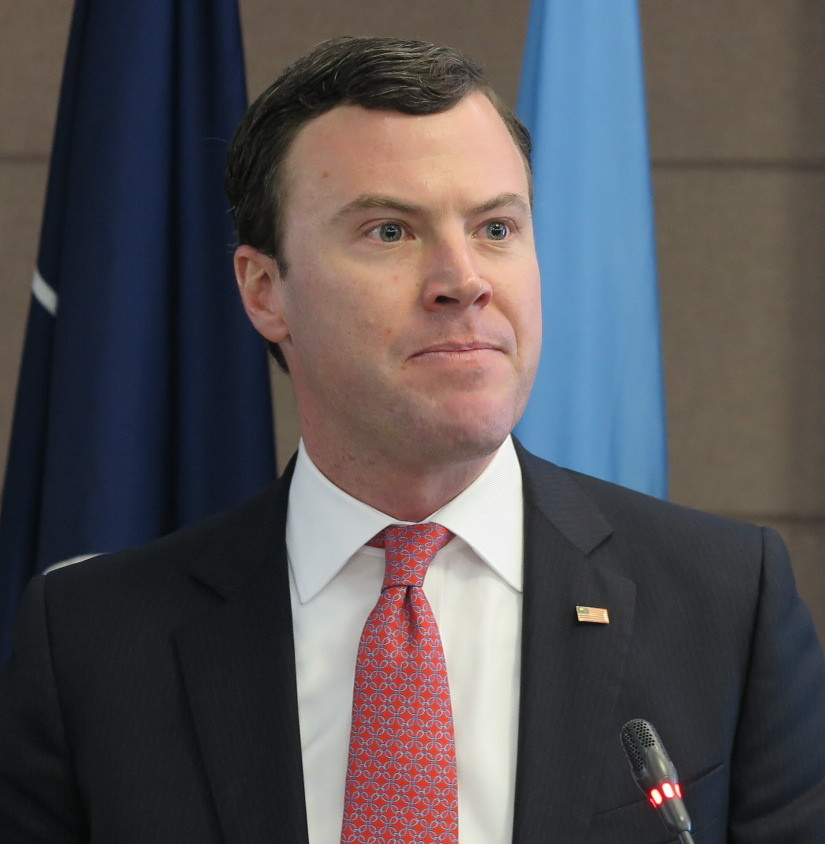
- Education: Bachelor of Arts in arts management; Graduate certificate and Master's in intelligence analysis
- Alma mater: College of Charleston; The Citadel, The Military College of South Carolina
- Occupation: Security consultant
- Years active: 2005-present
- Known for: Terrorism analysis and collaboration with anti-ISIS hactivists
- Website: terrorismanalyst.com

Michael S. Smith II is an American terrorism analyst, specialist in open source intelligence (OSINT), and a consultant in preventing and countering violent extremism. He is also a lecturer at Johns Hopkins University's Global Security Studies program.

== Education ==
Smith received his undergraduate degree in arts management from the College of Charleston, and a graduate certificate in Intelligence Analysis, followed by a master's degree in Intelligence and Security Studies, from The Citadel, The Military College of South Carolina. As of 2017 he was in a PhD program at Georgia State University in Communications, studying persuasion theory and terrorist propaganda produced to incite violence in the West.

== Career ==
In 2011, Smith founded Kronos Advisory, a security consulting firm with retired Marine General James E. Livingston.

Kronos provided a report to a Congressional caucus on the Quds Force in 2011. In 2013, Kronos began briefing the United States government on ISIS’s aspiration to perpetrate terrorist attacks in Europe.

Along with consulting for various government agencies, he tracked terrorist activity on social media and commented on it, and was called on as a pundit by various media groups. Smith was described as "a Republican counterterrorism specialist" (Note: On 8 March 2020, Smith noted via his verified Twitter account that he had "not been a Republican for three years".@MichaelSSmithII (8 March 2020). "I have not been a Republican for two years. It has been three years since I ran a company that was involved with counterterrorism work" (Tweet) – via Twitter.) and "an al-Qaeda analyst". In 2016, in recognition of his work "funneling hacker tips" about ISIS's activities online to government officials, Foreign Policy magazine included Smith among the "Moguls" on its annual list of "100 Leading Global Thinkers", and Fast Company magazine ranked Smith 14 on its list of the "100 Most Creative People in Business" for "helping hack the bad guys".

In January 2017 Kronos was dissolved. Smith reportedly considered taking a position in the Pentagon at the request of National Security Advisor Michael Flynn, but decided to instead pursue a doctorate degree due to his concerns about Sebastian Gorka's role in the Trump administration. In February 2017, Smith became involved in a public dispute with Gorka (then a senior advisor in the Trump administration) after Smith criticized Gorka on social media and in comments quoted in a story published by The Wall Street Journal.

Beginning in October 2017, Smith served as a fellow at the Washington, DC–based think tank New America for five months.

With representatives of Twitter, Facebook and Google, Smith provided expert testimony during the United States Senate Committee on the Judiciary, Subcommittee on Crime and Terrorism's October 31, 2017, hearing focused on extremist content and Russian disinformation online. In his testimony, Smith argued anonymity provided to social media users by major companies has increased the attractiveness of their technologies for terrorist groups like ISIS and he suggested that legislation should be implemented to compel tech companies to restrict VPN use on their platforms only to those whose identities they know.

In February 2018, Smith tweeted statements about the Chinese government that were described by HuffPost and various online news commentators as racist. New America terminated Smith's fellowship in response to his tweet and Smith apologized for it.

Since 2019, Smith has been a lecturer at Johns Hopkins University's Global Security Studies program.
