= Thomas P. M. Barnett =

American geostrategist

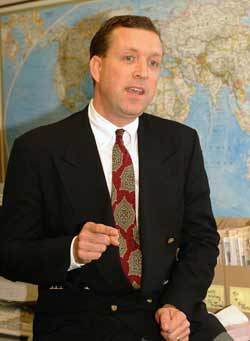
- Thomas P.M. Barnett
- Born: May 28, 1962 (age 63); Chilton, Wisconsin, U.S.
- Education: University of Wisconsin–Madison (BA); Harvard University (MA, PhD)
- Occupation: military geostrategist

Thomas P. M. Barnett (born 1962) is an American military geostrategist and former chief analyst at Wikistrat. He developed a geopolitical theory that divided the world into "the Functioning Core" and the "Non-Integrating Gap" that made him particularly notable prior to the 2003 U.S. Invasion of Iraq when he wrote an article for Esquire in support of the military action entitled "The Pentagon's New Map" (which would later become the title of a book that would elaborate on his geopolitical theories). The central thesis of his geopolitical theory is that the connections the globalization brings between countries (including network connectivity, financial transactions, and media flows) are synonymous with those countries with stable governments, rising standards of living, and "more deaths by suicide than by murder". These regions contrast with those where globalization has not yet penetrated, which is synonymous with political repression, poverty, disease, and mass-murder, and conflict. These areas make up the Non-Integrating Gap.

Key to Barnett's geostrategic ideas is that the United States should "export security" to the Gap in order to integrate and connect those regions with the Core, even if this means going to war in Gap countries, followed by long periods of nation-building.

== Education and career ==
Barnett was born in Chilton, Wisconsin and grew up in Boscobel, Wisconsin. After graduation from Boscobel High School, Barnett received a B.A. (Honors) from the University of Wisconsin–Madison in Russian language and literature, and international relations with an emphasis in U.S. foreign policy. He received his MA in regional studies: Russia, Eastern Europe and Central Asia and his PhD in political science from Harvard University.

From 1998 through 2004, Barnett was a senior strategic researcher and professor in the Warfare Analysis & Research Department, Center for Naval Warfare Studies, U.S. Naval War College, Newport, Rhode Island.

At the Naval War College, Barnett served as director of the New Rule Sets Project an effort designed to explore how the spread of globalization alters the basic "rules of the road" in the international security environment, with special reference to how these changes redefine the U.S. military's historic role as "security enabler" of America's commercial network ties with the world. The project was hosted by Cantor Fitzgerald and took place near the top of One World Trade Center. After the offices of Cantor Fitzgerald and its carbon credit brokerage subsidiary CantorCO2e were destroyed at One World Trade Center on 9/11/2001, Barnett described the event as the "first live-broadcast, mass snuff film in human history."

External videos
- Booknotes interview with Barnett on The Pentagon's New Map, May 30, 2004, C-SPAN
- PowerPoint presentation by Barnett on The Pentagon's New Map, June 2, 2004, C-SPAN
- Presentation by Barnett on The Pentagon's New Map, December 20, 2004, C-SPAN
- After Words interview with Barnett on Blueprint for Action, October 29, 2005, C-SPAN

Following the September 11, 2001 attacks, from October 2001 to June 2003, Barnett worked as the Assistant for Strategic Futures in the Office of Force Transformation in the Department of Defense under the direction of the late Vice Admiral (ret). Arthur K. Cebrowski, during which time he created a Powerpoint brief that developed into his book The Pentagon's New Map.

In 2003, he wrote an article titled "The Pentagon's New Map" for Esquire magazine that outlined many of these ideas. He developed the article into a book The Pentagon's New Map: War and Peace in the Twenty-First Century, published in 2004.

A sequel Blueprint for Action: A Future Worth Creating was published in 2005. He presented his ideas for changing America's military structure in February 2005 in Monterey, California, for a TED talk titled "Rethinking America's military strategy".

In 2010, he became chief analyst for the Israeli start-up Wikistrat.

Barnett is currently the senior managing director of Enterra Solutions, a contributing editor for Esquire magazine, and a distinguished scholar and author at the Howard H. Baker, Jr. Center for Public Policy at the University of Tennessee. He writes the New Rules column at World Politics Review.

== Ideas and concepts ==
Barnett's ideas involve the relationship between the United States and the rest of the world in past, present, and future contexts, although much of the work revolves around defining possible future roles of the country in the aftermath of the Cold War and terrorist actions such as the September 11, 2001 attacks.

Barnett had grown up with the expectation that the United States and the Soviet Union would remain in the Cold War standoff indefinitely, and had followed an education path that would have been useful for that context. However, shortly after he completed his education and started to work in the public and private sectors, the Soviet Union collapsed, leaving America as the world's sole superpower. He became an early advocate of collaborating with the new Russia to smooth the nation's transition into its new role in the world. The fall of the Soviet Union was a shock to the military establishment in the U.S., leaving many to wonder what nation or group of nations would pose a significant threat in the future.

Barnett proffered that without the Soviets to defend against, the American military establishment lost focus. Some planners were concerned that the new world order was one of chaos, which is hardly something that is easy to build war games around. Many theories were bandied about, ranging from rogue state theories involving states like Iraq and North Korea, to the rise of some unexpected country to great power, or, most predominantly, the emergence of China as a new threat. Nobody could clarify which concept was most likely, right up until the September 11 attacks seemed at the time to resolve the dispute.

The NewRuleSets.Project was one of many programs that the United States military has launched since the fall of the Soviet Union in order to determine what threats will emerge in the coming decades. The project is a unique collaboration between military and financial analysts. The project name comes from the idea of "rule sets," the combination of written and unwritten rules that people within a region use. It has been noted that countries that have similar rule sets tend to collaborate much more effectively than countries that have significant differences. For instance, the U.S. and Soviet Union had rule sets that were very different. Once the Soviets lost control, the country went through a "rule set reset," organizing itself to more closely align with the largely democratic and capitalist societies it had once opposed.

The group also noticed that globalization has caused a fairly common rule set to be shared between a great many countries around the world. States that have benefitted from globalization and begun to share in the wealth and prosperity associated with that are also losing interest in waging war with one another. Participants in the project noticed that once the per capita income of a country increases to about US$3000 per year, war essentially disappears. There are a few places where this hasn't exactly been the case, but it seems to largely hold true for now.

Another interesting thing to note was that, of U.S. military deployments around the world since 1990, virtually all have taken place in countries that do not meet that level of income. This leads him to unabashedly proclaim himself an economic determinist. Examining the regions more thoroughly, it was also noted that the countries have very little flow of people, information, or investment money across their borders. This all leads to the idea of these countries being "disconnected" from the outside world, running on rule sets that are different from that of globalized societies.

Barnett has termed the globalized countries the "Functioning Core" or simply "the Core". The other countries are part of the "Non-Integrating Gap", or simply "the Gap". The Gap has been shrinking as globalization has expanded. Since most terrorists seem to come from the Gap, he believes that the American military should focus on building partnerships with "seam states", countries bordering the Gap, to stabilize those regions. Stable states would bring more investment and more connectedness with the outside world, therefore progressively shrinking the Gap. The result of all of this, if it proves to be successful, would be nothing less than the end of interstate warfare on the planet, and probably a significant reduction in intrastate warfare and other problems like terrorism.

== Esquire Magazine and the resignation of Admiral Fallon ==
Barnett received notoriety in March 2008 for publishing an article in Esquire magazine on Admiral William Fallon which portrayed the Admiral at odds with the Bush administration. This led to Fallon's resignation as the head of Central Command.

== Proposed China–US Grand Strategy Agreement ==
After joining the Center for America China Partnership in 2010, Barnett and his two colleagues, John Milligan-Whyte and Dai Min, prepared the China US Grand Strategy Proposal between Presidents Hu and Obama. The agreement received input from China's former Minister of Foreign Affairs, former UN Ambassador, former U.S. Ambassador, former Deputy Chief of the General Staff of the PLA, former Military Attaché to North Korea and Israel, former Vice Minister of Commerce, Central Party School Institute of International Strategic Studies, Chinese People's Institute of Foreign Affairs, China Center for International Economic Exchanges, China Institute For International Strategic Studies, China Foundation for International & Strategic Studies, Boao Forum, State Council’s China Institute of Contemporary International Relations, and premier and state councilors.

The agreement's provisions were introduced in Barnett's column in World Politics Review, and in John Milligan-Whyte and Dai Min’s columns in People’s Daily Online in English and in China Daily Online in Mandarin. The text of the agreement itself appeared in the September/October 2011 edition of Foreign Affairs.

== Personal life ==
In a speech about globalization, Barnett confided that after having three children, he and his wife "adopted three girls from abroad – one from China and two from Ethiopia."

== Bibliography ==
External videos
- Presentation by Barnett on Great Powers, February 10, 2009, C-SPAN

- Thomas P.M. Barnett (1992). Romanian and East German Policies in the Third World. Praeger Publishers. ISBN 0-275-94117-5
- Thomas P.M. Barnett (2004). The Pentagon's New Map: War and Peace in the Twenty-First Century. Putnam Publishing Group. ISBN 0-399-15175-3
- Thomas P.M. Barnett (2005). Blueprint for Action: A Future Worth Creating. Putnam Publishing Group. ISBN 0-399-15312-8
- Barnett, Thomas P.M. (2007-06-27). "The Americans Have Landed". Esquire.
- Thomas P.M. Barnett (2009). Great Powers: America and the World after Bush. Putnam Publishing Group. ISBN 978-0-399-15537-6
- Thomas P.M. Barnett (2023). America's New Map: Restoring Our Global Leadership in an Era of Climate Change and Demographic Collapse. BenBella Books ISBN 978-1637744291
- Lorraine McCall, Lars Karlsson, Philip Kretsedemas, Maria Burns, Thomas P.M. Barnett, Alan Bersin, Christopher M. Ellis, William Rials, Thomas P. Russo (2023). Immigration, the Borderlands, and the Resilient Homeland, Bernan Press, ISBN 9781636713854

== See also ==
- Network-centric warfare
