= The Pentagon's New Map =

2004 book by Thomas P.M. Barnett

The Pentagon's New Map: War and Peace in the Twenty-First Century
- Author: Thomas P.M. Barnett
- Language: English
- Genre: Non-fiction
- Publisher: Putnam
- Publication date: April 22, 2004
- Publication place: United States
- ISBN: 0-399-15175-3

The Pentagon's New Map: War and Peace in the Twenty-First Century is a 2004 book by Thomas P.M. Barnett based on an earlier article he wrote for Esquire magazine. It outlines a new grand strategy for American foreign policy. It is an iteration of a PowerPoint presentation that Barnett has been making for years that is known simply as "The Brief." Interested parties include the public and private sectors, encompassing military organizations and foreign governments.

At least two versions of Barnett's presentation have aired on C-SPAN as of 2005. In December 2004, the network broadcast one of Barnett's recent presentations followed with a live call-in program in which Barnett discussed his book and its effects. See the article on Barnett for an outline of his ideas.

Barnett was asked by the United States Air Force to give the presentation to every new officer who attained the rank of general.

In late 2004, Barnett's employer (the Naval War College) gave him the choice of either writing the second book or retaining his job. He chose the former, and wrote Blueprint for Action: A Future Worth Creating. Barnett also continues to write articles as a contributing editor at Esquire and consult on global security issues as a senior managing director at Enterra Solutions. He is currently in the planning stages of a third book on Resiliency with co-author Stephen DeAngelis, founder of Enterra Solutions.

== Chapters ==
1. New Rule Sets
2. The Rise of the "Lesser Includeds"
3. Disconnectedness Defines Danger
4. The Core and the Gap
5. The New Ordering Principle
6. The Global Transaction Strategy
7. The Myths We Make (I Will Now Dispel)
8. Hope without Guarantees
9. Quagmire: Iraq, Syria, and beyond

== Key ideas ==
1. Systems of rules called Rule-sets reduce violent conflict. Violence decreases as rules are established (e.g., the WTO Dispute Settlement Understanding) for dealing with international conflicts.
2. The world can be roughly divided into two groups: the Functioning Core, characterized by economic interdependence, and the Non-Integrated Gap, characterized by unstable leadership and absence from international trade. The Core can be sub-divided into Old Core (North America, Europe, Japan, Australia) and New Core (China, India, South Africa, Brazil, Argentina, Chile and Russia). The Disconnected Gap includes the Middle East, South Asia (except India), most of Africa, Southeast Asia, and northwest South America.
3. Integration of the Gap countries into the global economy will provide opportunities for individuals living in the Gap to improve their lives, thereby presenting a desirable alternative to violence and terrorism. The US military is the only force capable of providing the military support to facilitate this integration by serving as the last-ditch rule-enforcer. Barnett argues that it has been doing so for over 20 years by "exporting" security (US spends about half of the world's total in military spending).
4. To be successful the US military must stop thinking of war in the context of war but war in the context of "everything else", i.e. demographics, energy, investment, security, politics, trade, immigration, etc.
5. In recognition of its dual role, the US military should organize itself according to two functions, the "Leviathan" and the "System Administrator."
  - Leviathan's purpose is the use of overwhelming force in order to end violence quickly. It will take out governments, defend Core countries, and generally do the deterrence work that the US military has been doing since the end of WWII. The Leviathan force is primarily staffed by young aggressive personnel and is overwhelmingly American.
  - The SysAdmin's purpose is to wage peace: peacekeeping, nation building, strengthening weak governments, etc. The SysAdmin force is primarily staffed by older, more experienced personnel, though not entirely (he would put the Marines in SysAdmin as the "Mini-me Leviathan"). The sys Admin force would work best as a Core-wide phenomenon.
6. By exporting security, the US and the rest of the Core benefit from increased trade, increased international investment, and other benefits.

== Books ==
- Thomas P.M. Barnett (April 22, 2004). The Pentagon's New Map. Putnam Publishing Group. ISBN 0-399-15175-3
- Thomas P.M. Barnett (October 20, 2005). Blueprint for Action. Putnam Publishing Group. ISBN 0-399-15312-8
- Thomas P.M. Barnett (January, 2009). Great Powers: America and the World after Bush. Putnam Publishing Group. ISBN 978-0-399-15537-6
