= Gulf War =

1990–1991 conflict in the Middle East

- Part of the Arab Cold War
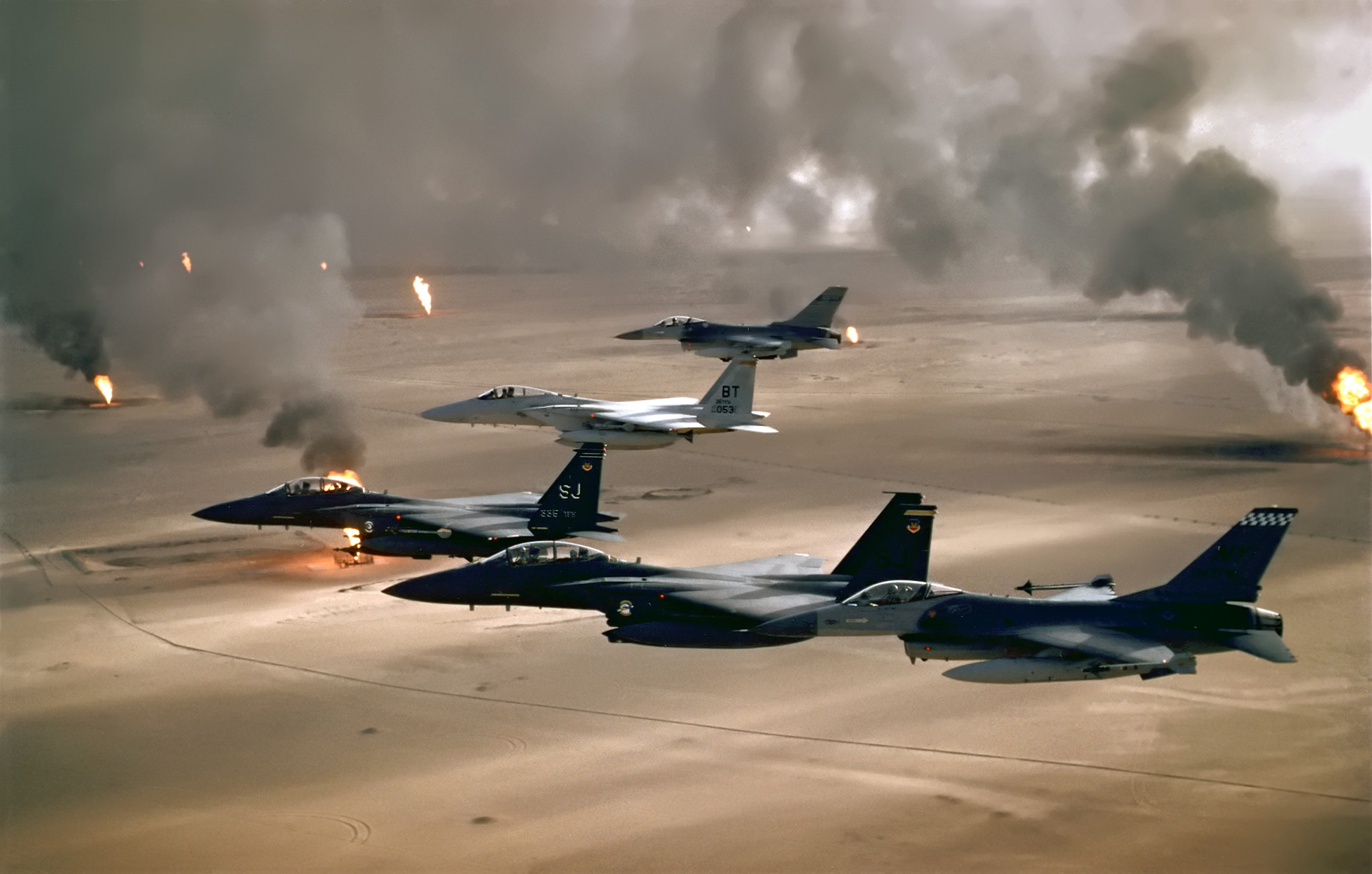
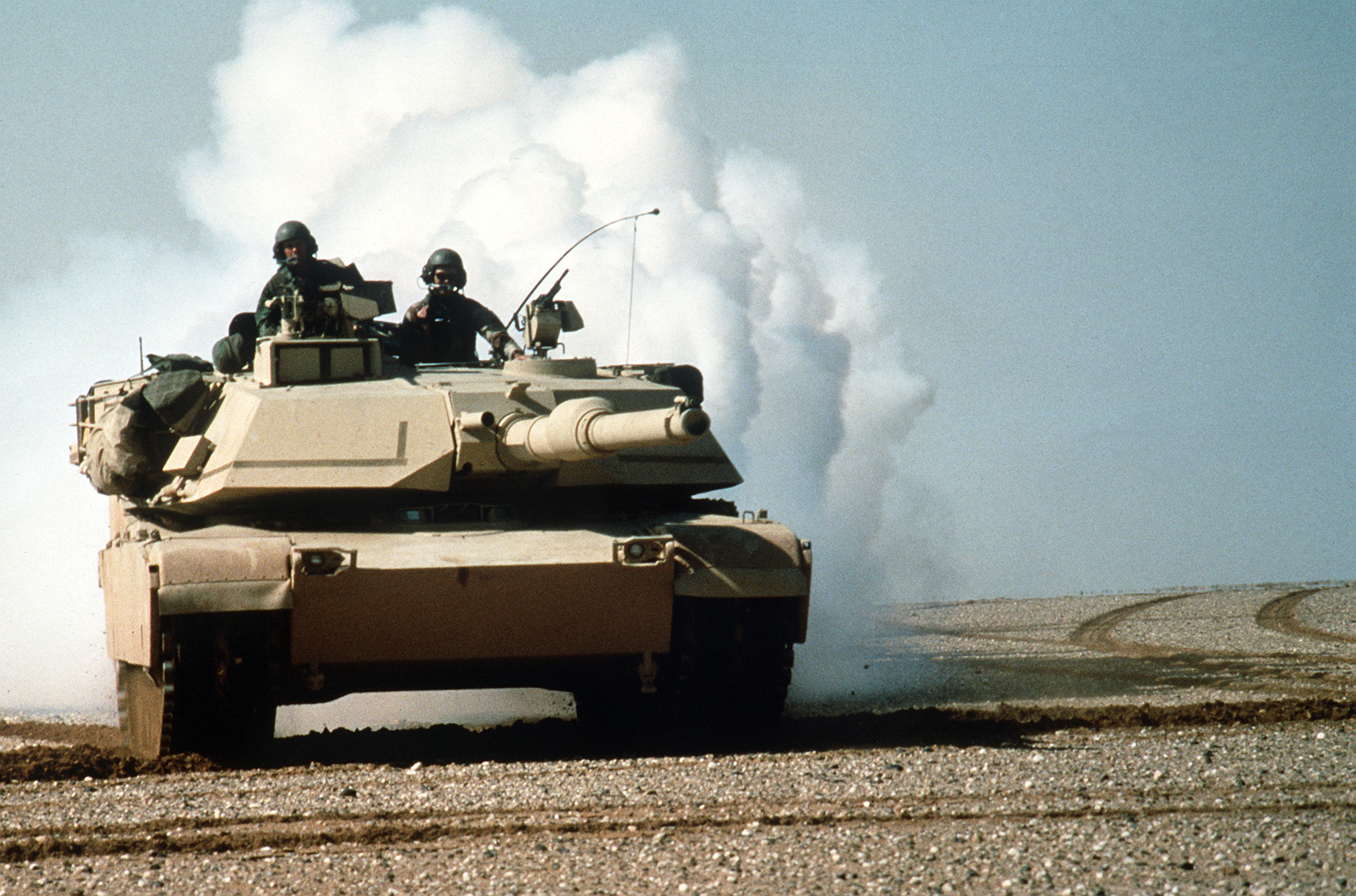
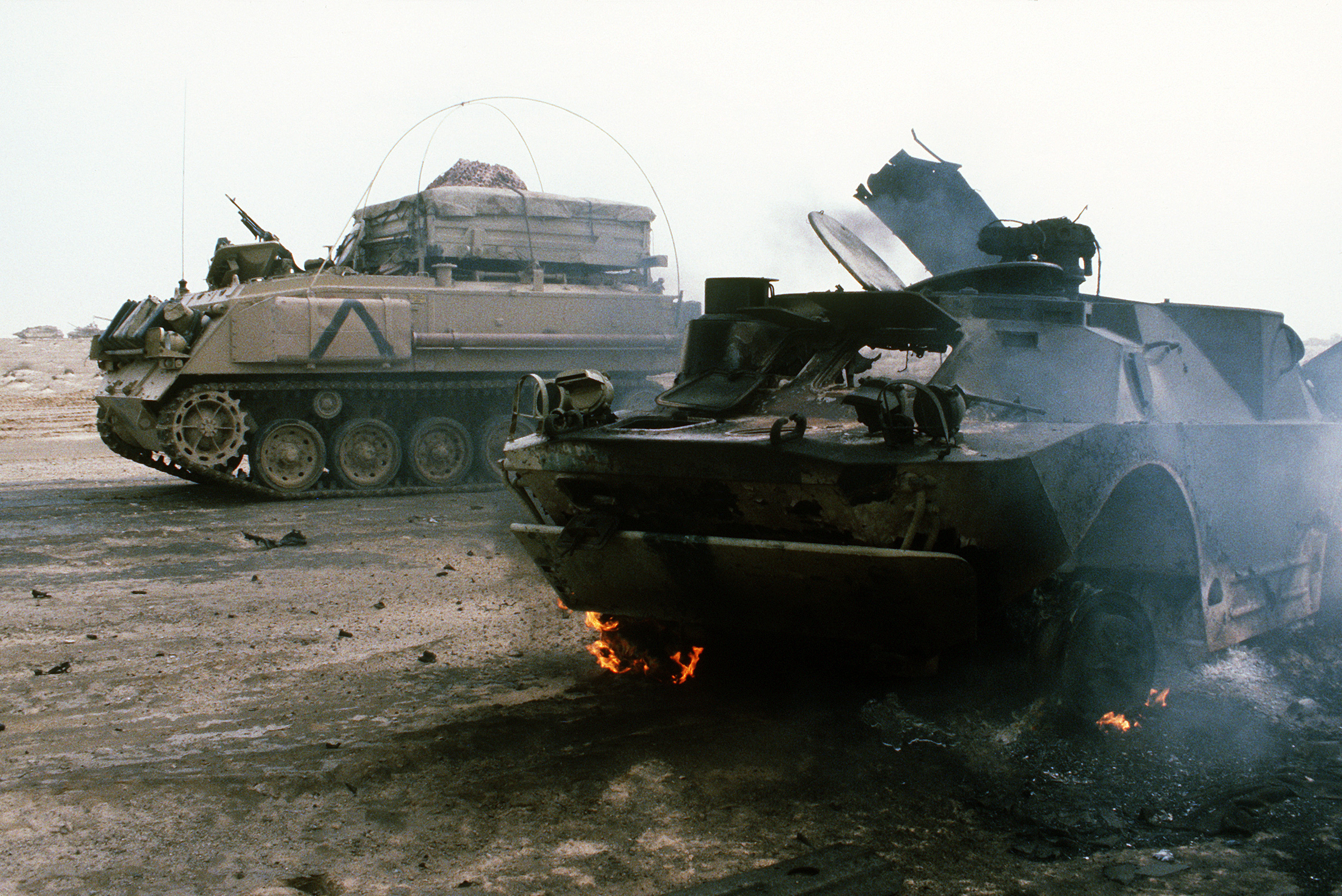
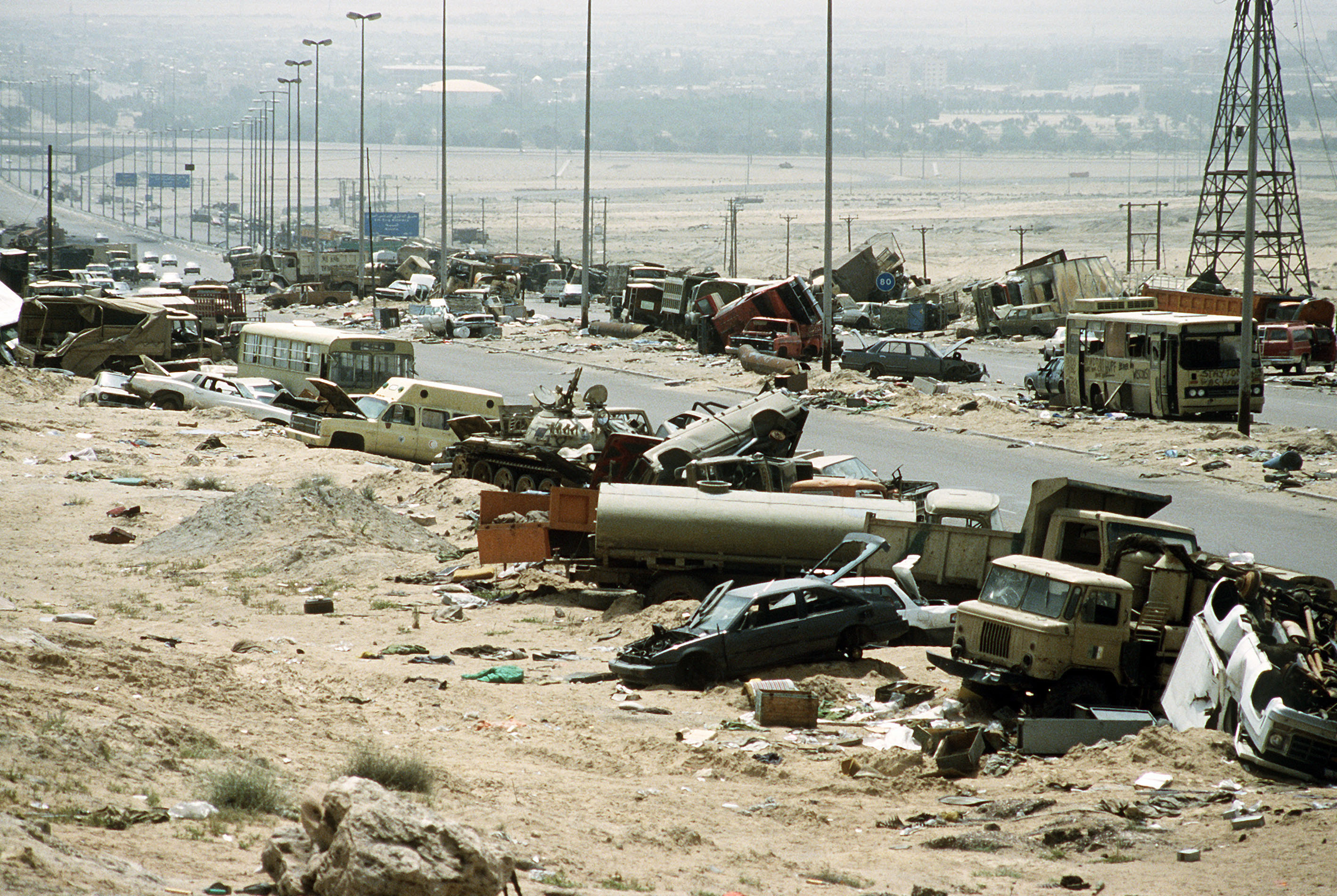
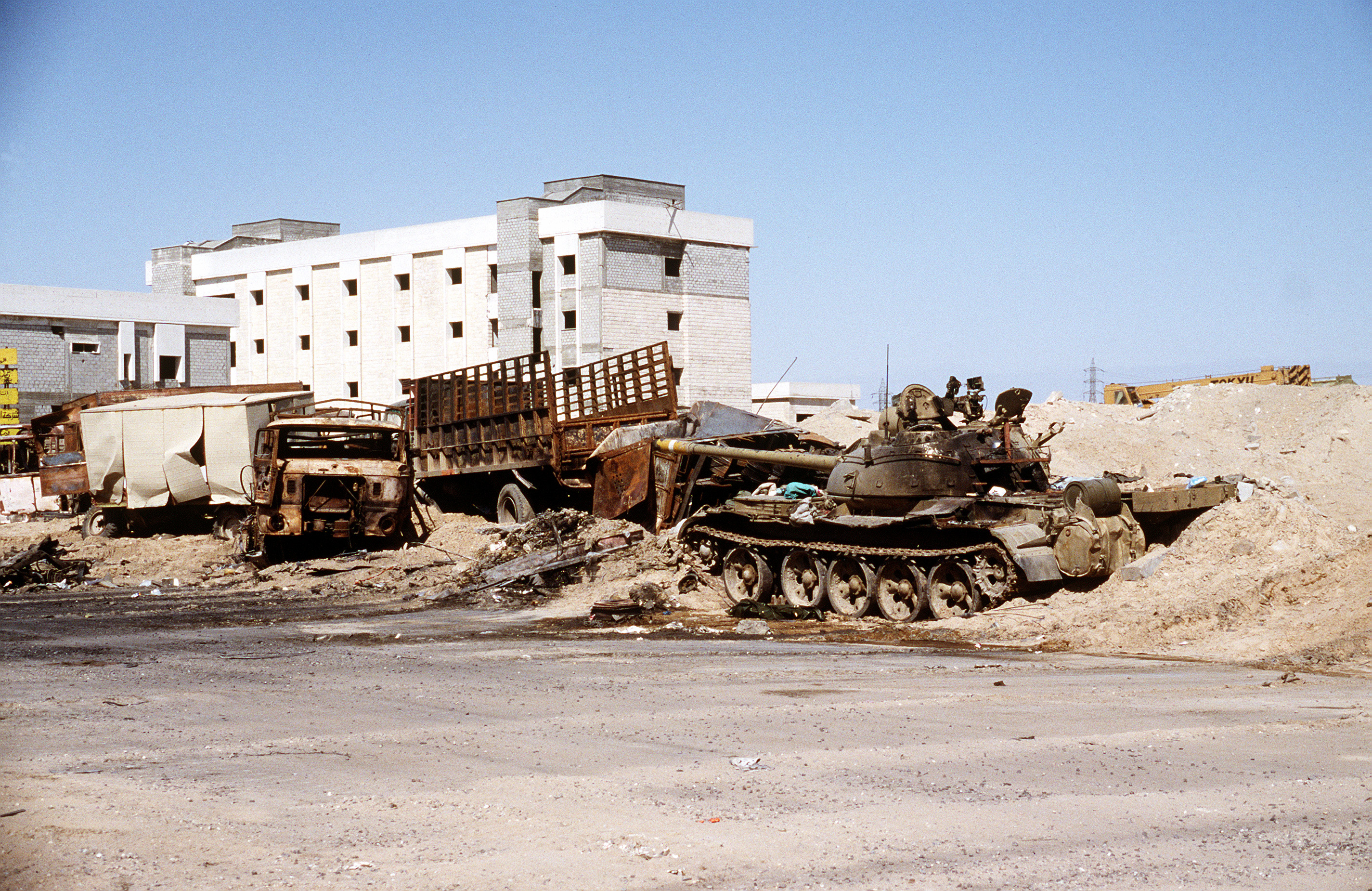
- From top to bottom, left to right: U.S. Air Force F-15Es, F-16s, and an F-15C flying over burning Kuwaiti oil wells; a U.S. Army M1 Abrams laying down a smokescreen; British FV432 passes a burning Iraqi BRDM-2; wrecked and abandoned vehicles on the Highway of Death; destroyed Iraqi T-55 at the Al Mutla Pass
Date	2 August 1990 – 17 January 1991 (Operation Desert Shield); 17 January – 28 February 1991 (Operation Desert Storm) (6 months, 3 weeks and 5 days)
Location	Middle East and Persian Gulf
Result	Coalition victory
Territorial changes	Establishment of a demilitarized zone and construction of a separation barrier along the Iraq–Kuwait border

Belligerents
United States; United Kingdom; France; Saudi Arabia; Egypt; Kuwait; (United Nations) Coalition: Afghan mujahideen; Argentina; Australia; Bahrain; Bangladesh; Belgium; Canada; Czechoslovakia; Denmark; Germany; Greece; Honduras; Hungary; Italy; Japan; Luxembourg; Morocco; Netherlands; New Zealand; Somalia; Norway; Oman; Pakistan; Philippines; Poland; Portugal; Qatar; Romania; Senegal; Sierra Leone; Singapore; South Korea; Spain; Sweden; Syria; Turkey; United Arab Emirates	Iraq

Commanders and leaders
George Bush; Norman Schwarzkopf; Chuck Horner; Margaret Thatcher; King Fahd; Hosni Mubarak; Sheikh Jaber III	Saddam Hussein

Strength
Over 950,000 soldiers 3,113 tanks 1,800 aircraft 2,200 artillery systems	1,000,000+ soldiers (~600,000 in Kuwait); 5,500 tanks 700+ aircraft 3,000 artillery systems

Casualties and losses
Total: 13,488; Coalition: 292 killed (147 killed by enemy action, 145 non-hostile deaths); 776 wounded (467 wounded in action); 31 tanks destroyed/disabled; 28 Bradley IFVs destroyed/damaged; 1 M113 APC destroyed; 2 British Warrior IFVs destroyed; 1 artillery piece destroyed; 75 aircraft destroyed; Kuwait: 420 killed; 12,000 captured; ≈200 tanks destroyed/captured; 850+ other armored vehicles destroyed/captured; 57 aircraft lost; 8 aircraft captured (Mirage F1s); 17 ships sunk, 6 captured	Total: 175,000–300,000+; Iraqi: 20,000–50,000 killed; 75,000+ wounded; 80,000–175,000 captured; 3,300 tanks destroyed; 2,100 APCs destroyed; 2,200 artillery pieces destroyed; 110 aircraft destroyed; 137 aircraft flown to Iran to escape destruction; 19 ships sunk, 6 damaged
- Kuwaiti civilian losses: Over 1,000 killed 600 missing people Iraqi civilian losses: 3,664 killed directly Total Iraqi losses (including 1991 Iraqi uprisings): 142,500–206,000 deaths (according to Medact) (Note: Including 100,000–120,000 military deaths, 3,000–15,000 civilian deaths during the war, 4,000–6,000 civilian deaths up to April 1991, and 35,000–65,000 civilian deaths from the Iraqi uprisings after the end of the Gulf War.); Other civilian losses: 74 killed in Israel, 230 injured 1 killed in Saudi Arabia, 85 injured

The Gulf War was an armed conflict between Iraq and a 42-country coalition led by the United States in response to the Iraqi invasion of Kuwait on 2 August 1990. The coalition's efforts were carried out in two phases: Operation Desert Shield, which marked the military buildup in the Persian Gulf region from August 1990 to January 1991; and Operation Desert Storm, which began with the bombing campaign against Iraq on 17 January and continued until the liberation of Kuwait on 28 February.

Iraq's invasion of Kuwait was met with immediate international condemnation as well as unanimous resolutions by the UN Security Council, which demanded Iraq's immediate withdrawal on the day of the invasion and authorized a total embargo four days later. The ensuing assembly of the coalition involved the participation of 42 countries, making it the broadest military alliance since World War II, with its largest contributors being the US, Saudi Arabia, the United Kingdom, and Egypt.

On 29 November 1990, the Security Council issued an ultimatum empowering UN member states to use "all necessary means" to end the occupation of Kuwait if the country was not completely free of Iraqi forces by 15 January 1991. Two days after the deadline, on 17 January, the coalition began an aerial and naval bombardment of Iraq and Iraqi-occupied Kuwait, continuing this campaign for five weeks. Iraq responded through a series of missile attacks against Israel and then against Saudi Arabia, although this campaign failed to achieve its goal of convincing Muslim-majority states to rescind their support for the coalition. On 24 February 1991, the coalition launched a decisive ground offensive into occupied Kuwait and subsequently into Iraqi territory, thereafter declaring a ceasefire within 100 hours.

In the war's aftermath, the Iraqi government violently suppressed a series of internal uprisings until 5 April 1991. Coalition countries responded by establishing dual no-fly zones covering Iraq's northern and southern halves. The UN Special Commission sought to end Iraq's weapons-of-mass-destruction programs. In 2003, another US-led coalition invaded and occupied Iraq, beginning the Iraq War.

The conflict's environmental impact included Iraqi forces causing over six hundred oil well fires and the largest oil spill in history until that point. US bombing and demolition of Iraqi chemical weapons facilities were concluded to be the primary cause of Gulf War syndrome, experienced by over 40% of US veterans.

The conflict introduced live news broadcasts from the front lines of the battle, principally by American network CNN. It earned the nickname "Video Game War", after the daily broadcast of images from cameras onboard American military aircraft. The war highlighted new military technologies including military satellites, precision-guided munitions and a stealth aircraft, the F-117 Nighthawk. The largest tank battles in American military history were also fought, surpassed only by the Battle of the Bulge: the Battle of Medina Ridge, the Battle of Norfolk, and the Battle of 73 Easting.

== Names ==
The war is also known under other names, such as the Second Gulf War (not to be confused with the 2003 Iraq War, also referred to as such), Persian Gulf War, Kuwait War, or Iraq War (Note: The numbering of Persian Gulf conflicts depends on whether the Iran–Iraq War (1980–1988) is referred to as the First (Persian) Gulf War (English language sources prior to the start of the Kuwait war in 1990 usually called it the Gulf War), which would make the 1990 war the Second (Persian) Gulf War. Different sources may call the conflicts by different names. The name 'Persian Gulf' is itself a subject of dispute. The start date of the Kuwait War can also be seen as either August 1990 (when Iraq's Saddam Hussein invaded Kuwait) or as January 1991 (the start of Operation Desert Storm, when the US-led coalition forced Iraq out of Kuwait), so that the war is also often called the 1991 Gulf War, the 1990–1991 Gulf War, the 1990s Gulf War, etc. ... This dating is also used to distinguish it from the other two 'Gulf Wars'.) before the term "Iraq War" became identified with the 2003 Iraq War, also known in the US as "Operation Iraqi Freedom". The war was named Umm al-Ma'arik ("mother of all battles") by Iraqi officials. After the US invasion of Iraq in 2003, the Gulf War of 1990–1991 is often known as the "First Iraq War".

The following names have been used to describe the conflict itself: Gulf War and Persian Gulf War are the most common terms for the conflict used within western countries. It may also be called the First Gulf War, to distinguish it from the 2003 invasion of Iraq and the subsequent Iraq War. Some authors have called it the Second Gulf War to distinguish it from the Iran–Iraq War.

Liberation of Kuwait (Arabic: تحرير الكويت) (taḥrīr al-kuwayt) is the term used by Kuwait and most of the coalition's Arab states, including Saudi Arabia, Bahrain, Egypt, and the United Arab Emirates. Terms in other languages include French: la Guerre du Golfe and Guerre du Koweït (War of Kuwait); German: Golfkrieg (Gulf War) and Zweiter Golfkrieg (Second Gulf War).

=== Operational names ===
Most of the coalition states used various names for their operations and the war's operational phases. These are sometimes incorrectly used as the conflict's overall name, especially the US Desert Storm:

- Operation Desert Shield was the US operational name for the US buildup of forces and Saudi Arabia's defense from 2 August 1990 to 16 January 1991
- Operation Desert Storm was the US name of the airland conflict from 17 January 1991 through 28 February 1991
  - Operation Desert Sabre (early name Operation Desert Sword) was the US name for the air and land offensive against the Iraqi Army in the Kuwaiti Theater of Operations (the "100-hour war") from 24 to 28 February 1991, in itself, part of Operation Desert Storm
- Operation Desert Farewell was the name given to the return of US units and equipment to the US in 1991 after Kuwait's liberation, sometimes referred to as Operation Desert Calm
- Operativo Alfil was the Argentine name for Argentine military activities
- Opération Daguet was the French name for French military activities in the conflict
- Operation Friction was the name of the Canadian operations
- Operation Granby was the British name for British military activities during the operations and conflict
- Operazione Locusta (Italian for Locust) was the Italian name for the operations and conflict

== Background ==
Throughout the Cold War, Iraq had been an ally of the Soviet Union, and there was a history of friction between Iraq and the United States. The US was concerned with Iraq's position on Israeli–Palestinian politics. The US also disliked Iraqi support for Palestinian militant groups, which led to Iraq's inclusion on the developing US list of State Sponsors of Terrorism in December 1979.

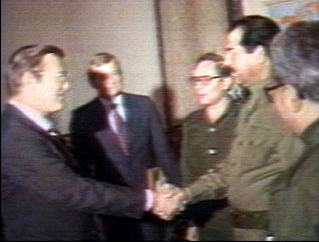
Donald Rumsfeld, US special envoy to the Middle East, meets Saddam Hussein in Bagdad in December 1983.

The US remained officially neutral after Iraq's invasion of Iran in 1980, which became the Iran–Iraq War, although it provided resources, political support, and some "non-military" aircraft to Iraq. In March 1982, Iran began a successful counteroffensive (Operation Undeniable Victory), and the US increased its support for Iraq to prevent Iran from forcing a surrender. In a US bid to open full diplomatic relations with Iraq, the country was removed from the US list of State Sponsors of Terrorism. Ostensibly, this was because of improvement in the regime's record, although former US assistant defense secretary Noel Koch later stated: "No one had any doubts about [the Iraqis'] continued involvement in terrorism ... The real reason was to help them succeed in the war against Iran."

With Iraq's newfound success in the war, and the Iranian rebuff of a peace offer in July, arms sales to Iraq reached a record spike in 1982. When Iraqi president Saddam Hussein expelled Abu Nidal to Syria at the US's request in November 1983, the Reagan administration sent Donald Rumsfeld to meet Saddam as a special envoy and to cultivate ties. By the time the ceasefire with Iran was signed in August 1988, Iraq was heavily debt-ridden and tensions within society were rising. Most of its debt was owed to Saudi Arabia and Kuwait. Iraq's debts to Kuwait amounted to $14 billion. Iraq pressured both nations to forgive the debts, but they refused.

The Iraq–Kuwait border dispute involved Iraqi claims to Kuwaiti territory. Kuwait had been a part of the Ottoman Empire's province of Basra, something that Iraq claimed made Kuwait rightful Iraqi territory. Kuwait's ruling dynasty, the al-Sabah family, had concluded a protectorate agreement in 1899 that assigned responsibility for Kuwait's foreign affairs to the United Kingdom. The UK drew the border between Kuwait and Iraq in 1922, making Iraq almost entirely landlocked. Kuwait rejected Iraqi attempts to secure further provisions in the region.

Iraq also accused Kuwait of exceeding its OPEC quotas for oil production. In order for the cartel to maintain its desired price of $18 per barrel, discipline was required. The United Arab Emirates and Kuwait were consistently overproducing; the latter at least in part to repair losses caused by Iranian attacks in the Iran–Iraq War and to pay for the losses of an economic scandal. The result was a slump in the oil price – as low as $10 per barrel ($63/m^{3}) – with a resulting loss of $7 billion a year to Iraq, equal to its 1989 balance of payments deficit. Resulting revenues struggled to support the government's basic costs, let alone repair Iraq's damaged infrastructure. Jordan and Iraq both looked for more discipline, with little success.

The Iraqi government described it as a form of economic warfare, which it claimed was aggravated by Kuwait slant-drilling across the border into Iraq's Rumaila oil field. According to oil workers in the area, Iraq's slant drilling claim was fabricated, as "oil flows easily from the Rumaila field without any need for these techniques." At the same time, Saddam looked for closer ties with those Arab states that had supported Iraq in the war. This move was supported by the US, who believed that Iraqi ties with pro-Western Gulf states would help bring and maintain Iraq inside the US' sphere of influence.

In 1989, it appeared that Saudi–Iraqi relations, strong during the war, would be maintained. A pact of non-interference and non-aggression was signed between the countries, followed by a Kuwaiti-Iraqi deal for Iraq to supply Kuwait with water for drinking and irrigation, although a request for Kuwait to lease Iraq Umm Qasr was rejected. Saudi-backed development projects were hampered by Iraq's large debts, even with the demobilization of 200,000 soldiers. Iraq also looked to increase arms production so as to become an exporter, although the success of these projects was also restrained by Iraq's obligations; in Iraq, resentment to OPEC's controls mounted.

Iraq's relations with its Arab neighbors, particularly Egypt, were degraded by mounting violence in Iraq against expatriate groups, who were well-employed during the war, by unemployed Iraqis, among them demobilized soldiers. These events drew little notice outside the Arab world because of fast-moving events directly related to the fall of Communism in Eastern Europe. However, the US did begin to condemn Iraq's human rights record, including the well-known use of torture.

The UK also condemned the execution of Farzad Bazoft, a journalist working for the British newspaper The Observer. Following Saddam's declaration that "binary chemical weapons" would be used on Israel if it used military force against Iraq, Washington halted part of its funding. A UN mission to the Israeli-occupied territories, where riots had resulted in Palestinian deaths, was vetoed by the US, making Iraq deeply skeptical of US foreign policy aims in the region, combined with the reliance of the US on Middle Eastern energy reserves.

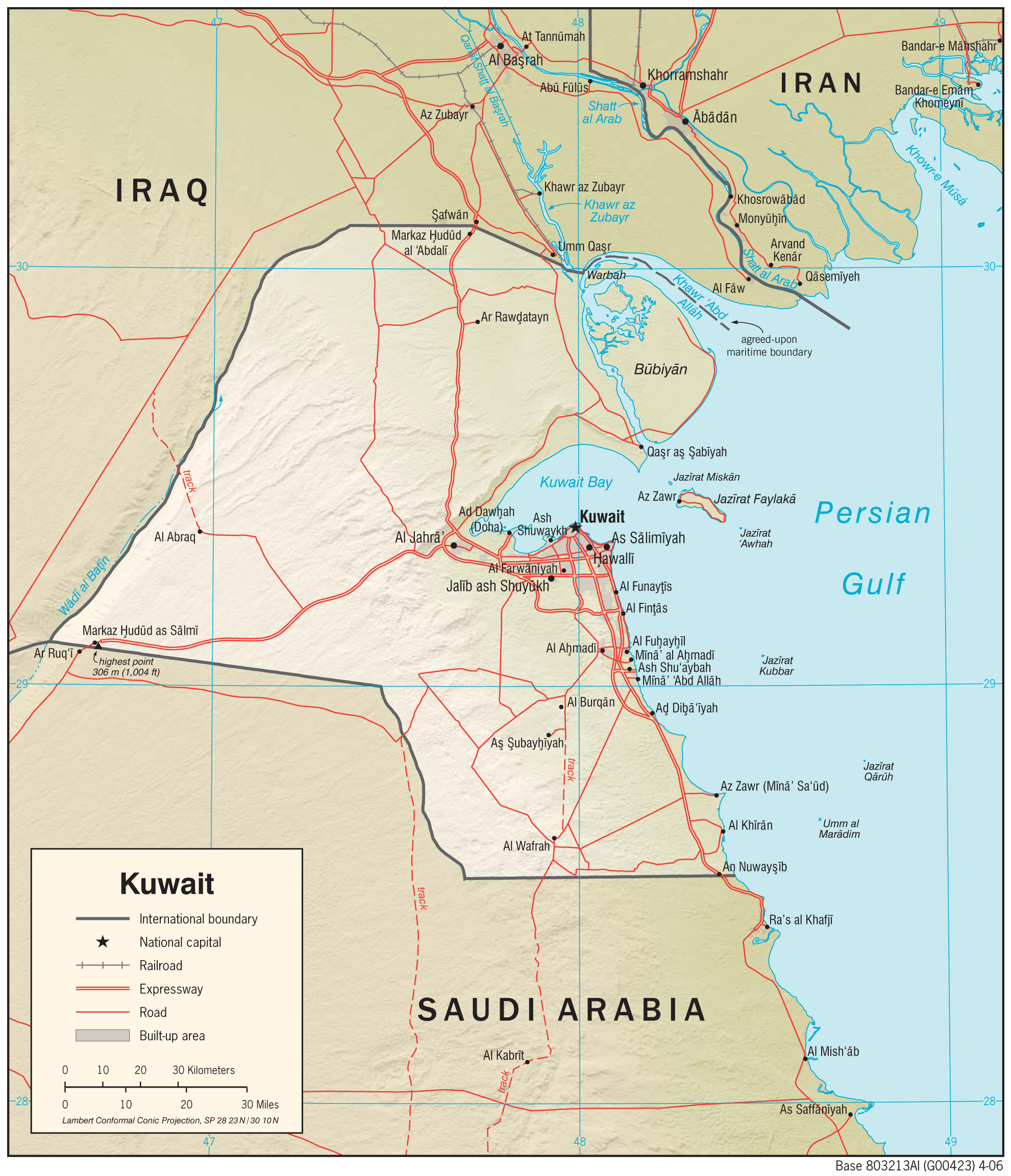
A map of Kuwait

In early July 1990, Iraq complained about Kuwait's behavior, such as not respecting their quota, and openly threatened to take military action. On the 23rd, the CIA reported that Iraq had moved 30,000 troops to the Iraq–Kuwait border, and the US naval fleet in the Persian Gulf was placed on alert. Saddam believed an anti-Iraq conspiracy was developing – Kuwait had begun talks with Iran, and Iraq's rival Syria had arranged a visit to Egypt.

On 15 July 1990, Saddam's government laid out its combined objections to the Arab League, including that policy moves were costing Iraq $1 billion a year, that Kuwait was still using the Rumaila oil field, and that loans made by the UAE and Kuwait could not be considered debts to its "Arab brothers". He threatened force against Kuwait and the UAE, saying: "The policies of some Arab rulers are American ... They are inspired by America to undermine Arab interests and security."

The US sent aerial refuelling planes and combat ships to the Persian Gulf in response to these threats. Discussions in Jeddah, Saudi Arabia, mediated on the Arab League's behalf by Egyptian president Hosni Mubarak, were held on 31 July and led Mubarak to believe that a peaceful course could be established.

During Saddam Hussein's 2003–2004 interrogation following his capture he claimed that in addition to economic disputes, an insulting exchange between the Kuwaiti emir Al Sabah and the Iraqi foreign minister – during which the emir stated his intention to turn "every Iraqi woman into a $10 prostitute" by bankrupting the country – was a decisive factor in triggering the Iraqi invasion.

On 25 July, Saddam met with April Glaspie, the US ambassador to Iraq, in Baghdad. The Iraqi leader attacked American policy with regards to Kuwait and the UAE:

So what can it mean when America says it will now protect its friends? It can only mean prejudice against Iraq. This stance plus maneuvers and statements which have been made has encouraged the UAE and Kuwait to disregard Iraqi rights ... If you use pressure, we will deploy pressure and force. We know that you can harm us although we do not threaten you. But we too can harm you. Everyone can cause harm according to their ability and their size. We cannot come all the way to you in the United States, but individual Arabs may reach you ... We do not place America among the enemies. We place it where we want our friends to be and we try to be friends. But repeated American statements last year made it apparent that America did not regard us as friends.

Glaspie replied:

I know you need funds. We understand that and our opinion is that you should have the opportunity to rebuild your country. But we have no opinion on the Arab-Arab conflicts, like your border disagreement with Kuwait ... Frankly, we can only see that you have deployed massive troops in the south. Normally that would not be any of our business. But when this happens in the context of what you said on your national day, then when we read the details in the two letters of the Foreign Minister, then when we see the Iraqi point of view that the measures taken by the UAE and Kuwait is, in the final analysis, parallel to military aggression against Iraq, then it would be reasonable for me to be concerned.

Saddam stated that he would attempt last-ditch negotiations with the Kuwaitis but Iraq "would not accept death."

According to Glaspie's own account, she stated in reference to the precise border between Kuwait and Iraq, "... that she had served in Kuwait 20 years before; 'then, as now, we took no position on these Arab affairs'." Glaspie similarly believed that war was not imminent.

Saddam's foreign minister Tariq Aziz later told PBS Frontline in 1996 that the Iraqi leadership was under "no illusion" about America's likely response to the Iraqi invasion: "She [Glaspie] didn't tell us anything strange. She didn't tell us in the sense that we concluded that the Americans will not retaliate. That was nonsense you see. It was nonsense to think that the Americans would not attack us." Then in a second 2000 interview with the same television program, Aziz said:

There were no mixed signals. We should not forget that the whole period before August 2 witnessed a negative American policy towards Iraq. So it would be quite foolish to think that, if we go to Kuwait, then America would like that. Because the American tendency ... was to untie Iraq. So how could we imagine that such a step was going to be appreciated by the Americans? It looks foolish, you see, this is fiction. About the meeting with April Glaspie—it was a routine meeting...She didn't say anything extraordinary beyond what any professional diplomat would say without previous instructions from his government...what she said were routine, classical comments on what the president was asking her to convey to President Bush. He wanted her to carry a message to George Bush—not to receive a message through her from Washington.

On 26 July 1990, only a few days before the Iraqi invasion, OPEC officials said that Kuwait and the United Arab Emirates had agreed to a proposal to limit their oil output to 1.5 million barrels (240,000 m^{3}) per day, "down from the nearly 2 million barrels a day they had each been pumping," thus potentially settling differences over oil policy between Kuwait and Iraq.

== Invasion of Kuwait ==
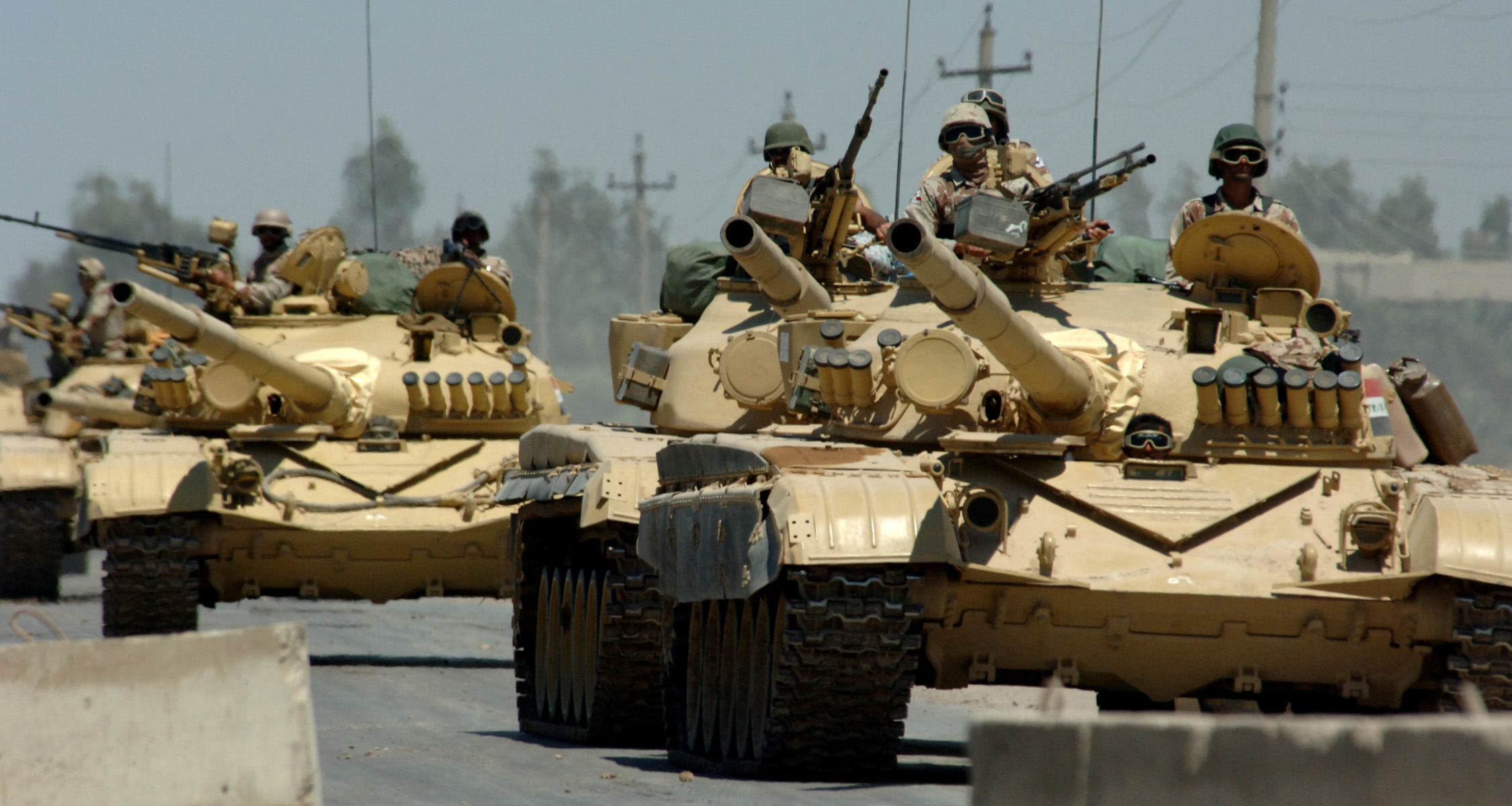
Lion of Babylon main battle tanks, common Iraqi battle tank used in the Gulf War by the Iraqi Army.

The result of the Jeddah talks was an Iraqi demand for $10 billion to cover the lost revenues from Rumaila. Kuwait offered $500 million. The Iraqi response was to immediately order an invasion, which started on 2 August 1990 with the bombing of Kuwait's capital, Kuwait City.

Before the invasion, the Kuwaiti military was believed to have numbered 16,000 men, arranged into three armored, one mechanized infantry and one under-strength artillery brigade. The pre-war strength of the Kuwait Air Force was around 2,200 Kuwaiti personnel, with 80 fixed-wing aircraft and 40 helicopters. In spite of Iraqi sabre-rattling, Kuwait did not mobilize its force; the army had been stood-down on 19 July, and during the Iraqi invasion many Kuwaiti military personnel were on leave.

By 1988, at the end of the Iran–Iraq war, the Iraqi Army was the world's fourth largest army, consisting of 955,000 standing soldiers and 650,000 paramilitary forces in the Popular Army. A low estimate shows the Iraqi Army capable of fielding 4,500 tanks, 484 combat aircraft and 232 combat helicopters. A high estimate shows the Iraqi Army capable of fielding one million troops and 850,000 reservists, 5,500 tanks, 3,000 artillery pieces, 700 combat aircraft and helicopters; it held 53 divisions, 20 special-forces brigades, and several regional militias, and had a strong air defense.

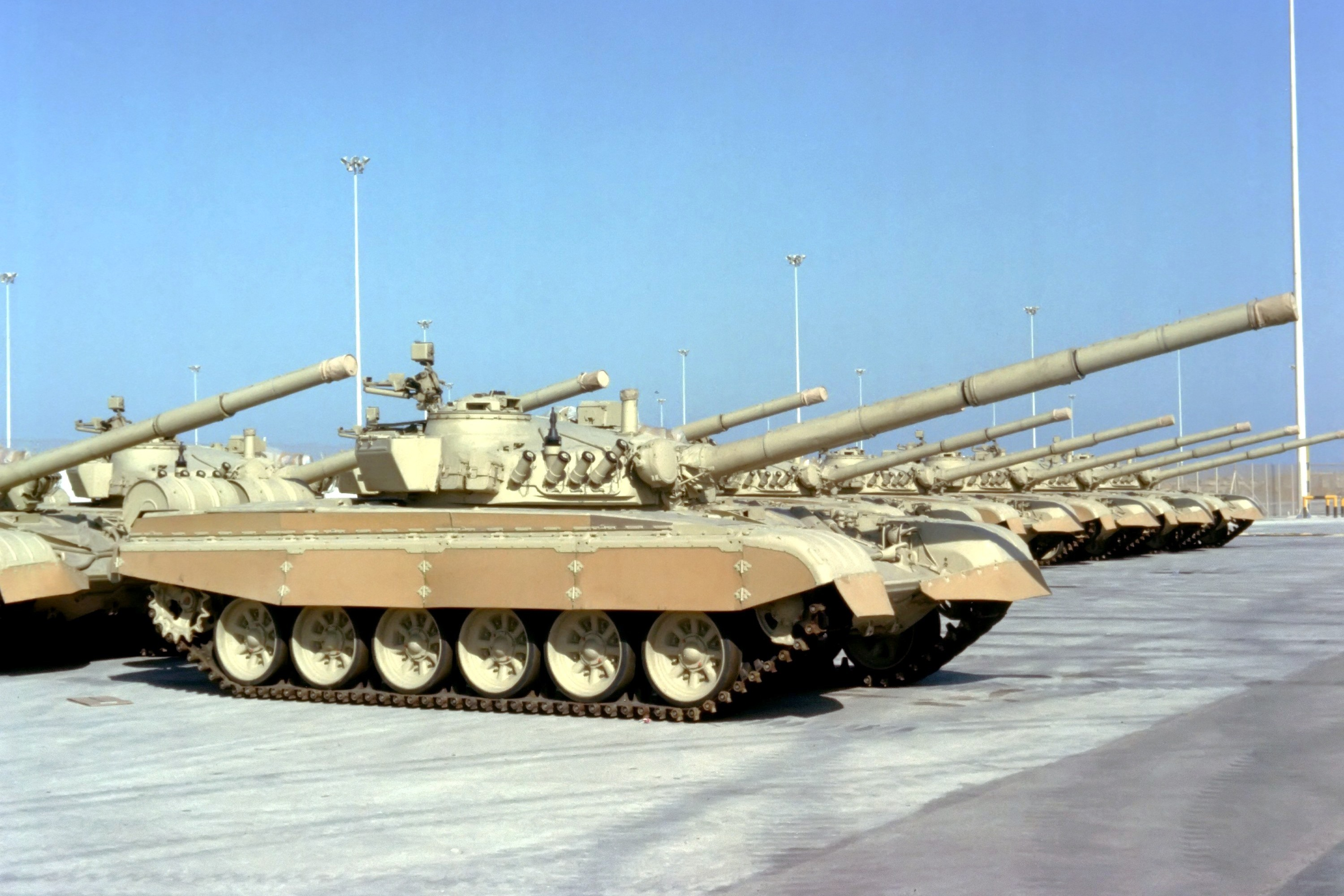
Kuwaiti Armed Forces M-84 main battle tanks

Iraqi commandos infiltrated the Kuwaiti border first to prepare for the major units, which began the attack at midnight. The Iraqi attack had two prongs, with the primary attack force driving south straight for Kuwait City down the main highway, and a supporting attack force entering Kuwait farther west, but then turning and driving east, cutting off Kuwait City from the country's southern half. The commander of a Kuwaiti armored battalion, 35th Armoured Brigade, deployed them against the Iraqi attack and conducted a robust defense at the Battle of the Bridges near Al Jahra, west of Kuwait City.

Kuwaiti aircraft scrambled to meet the invading force, but approximately 20% were lost or captured. A few combat sorties were flown against Iraqi ground forces.

The main Iraqi thrust into Kuwait City was conducted by commandos deployed by helicopters and boats to attack the city from the sea, while other divisions seized the airports and two airbases. The Iraqis attacked the Dasman Palace, the Royal Residence of Kuwait's emir, Jaber Al-Ahmad Al-Jaber Al-Sabah, which was defended by the Emiri Guard supported with M-84 tanks. In the process, the Iraqis killed Fahad Al-Ahmed Al-Jaber Al-Sabah, the Emir's youngest brother.

Within 12 hours, most resistance had ended within Kuwait, and the royal family had fled, allowing Iraq to control most of Kuwait. After two days of intense combat, most of the Kuwaiti military were either overrun by the Iraqi Republican Guard, or had escaped to Saudi Arabia. The emir and key ministers fled south along the highway for refuge in Saudi Arabia. Iraqi ground forces consolidated their control of Kuwait City, then headed south and redeployed along the Saudi border. After the decisive Iraqi victory, Saddam initially installed a puppet regime known as the "Provisional Government of Free Kuwait" before installing his cousin Ali Hassan al-Majid as Kuwait's governor on 8 August.

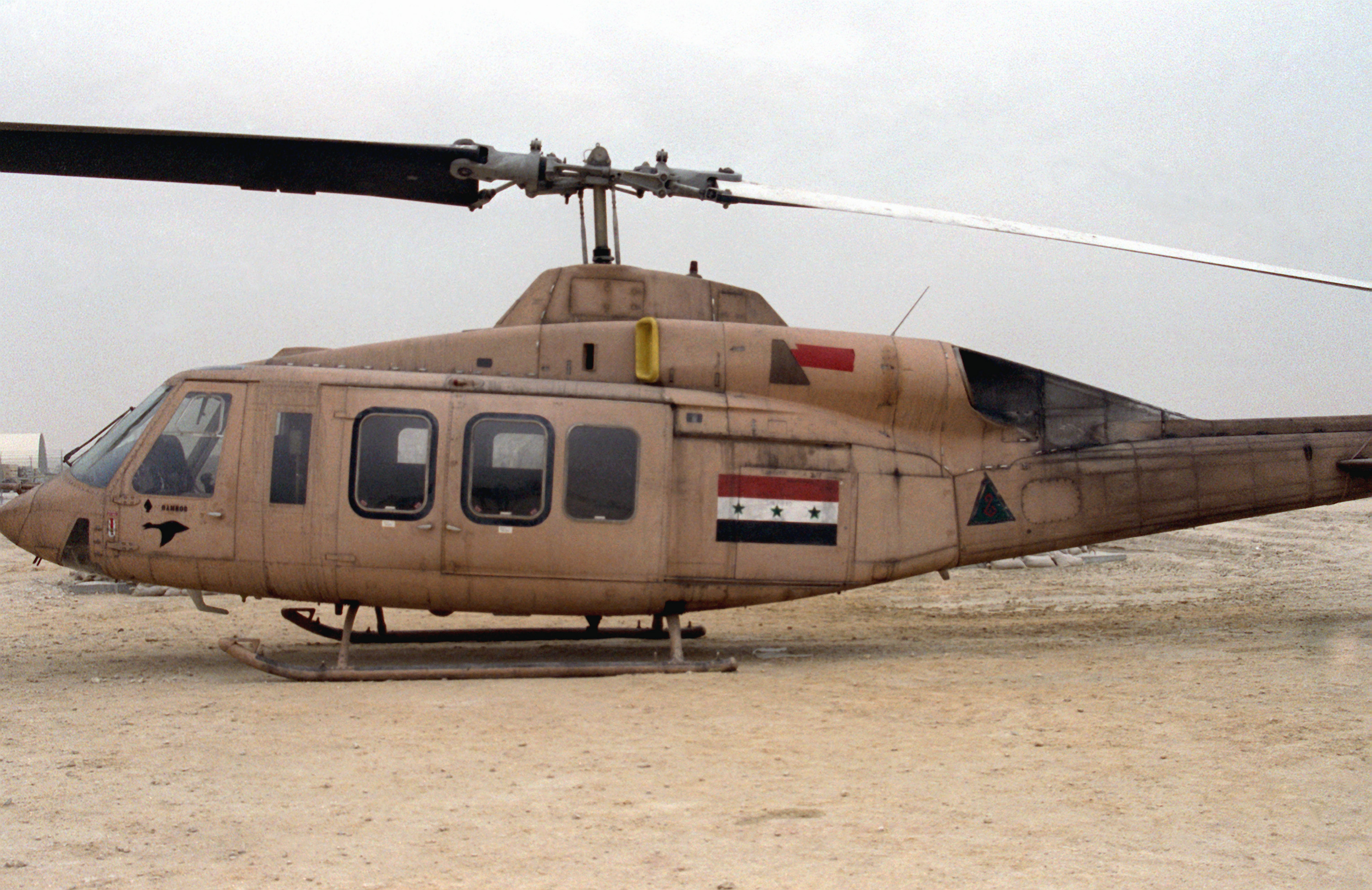
An Iraqi Air Force Bell 214ST transport helicopter, after being captured by a US Marine Corps unit at the start of the ground phase of Operation Desert Storm

After the invasion, the Iraqi military looted over $1 billion in banknotes from Kuwait's Central Bank. At the same time, Saddam Hussein made the Kuwaiti dinar equal to the Iraqi dinar, thereby lowering the Kuwaiti currency to one-twelfth of its original value. In response, Sheikh Jaber al-Ahmad al-Sabah ruled the banknotes as invalid and refused to reimburse stolen notes, which became worthless because of a UN embargo. After the conflict ended, many of the stolen banknotes made their way back into circulation. The stolen banknotes are a collectible for numismatists.

=== Kuwaiti resistance movement ===
Kuwaitis founded a local armed resistance movement following the Iraqi occupation of Kuwait. The Kuwaiti resistance's casualty rate far exceeded that of the coalition military forces and Western hostages. The resistance predominantly consisted of ordinary citizens who lacked any form of training and supervision.

== Run-up to the war ==
=== Diplomatic means ===
A key element of US political, military and energy economic planning occurred in 1984. The Iran–Iraq war had been going on for five years and both had sustained casualties into the hundreds of thousands. Within President Ronald Reagan's National Security Council concern was growing war could spread beyond the two belligerents. A National Security Planning Group meeting was formed, chaired by then vice president George H. W. Bush, to review US options. It was determined that the conflict would likely spread into Saudi Arabia and other Gulf states, but the US had little capability to defend the region. A prolonged war in the region would induce much higher oil prices and threaten the recovery of the world economy, which was just beginning to gain momentum.

In May 1984, President Reagan was briefed on the project conclusions by William Flynn Martin who had served as the head of the NSC staff that organized the study. The conclusions were: first, oil stocks needed to be increased among members of the International Energy Agency and, if necessary, released early if the oil market was disrupted; second, the US needed to strengthen the security of friendly Arab states in the region; and third, an embargo should be placed on sales of military equipment to Iran and Iraq. The plan was approved by Reagan and affirmed by the G7 leaders headed by the UK's prime minister, Margaret Thatcher, in the 10th G7 summit, held in London in June. The plan was implemented and became the basis for US preparedness to respond to the Iraqi occupation of Kuwait in 1991.

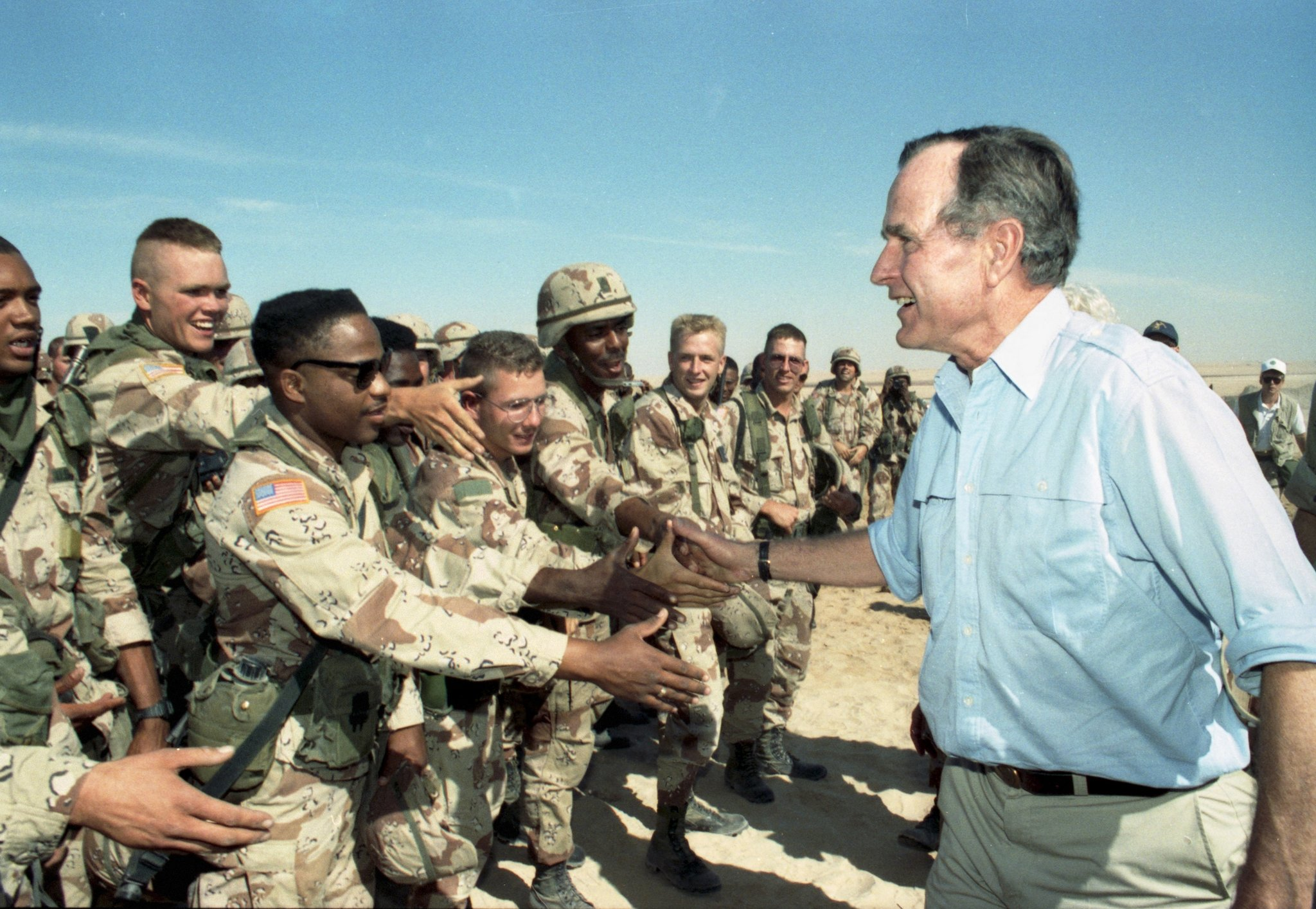
President Bush visiting American troops in Saudi Arabia on Thanksgiving Day, 1990

Within hours of the invasion, Kuwait and US delegations requested a meeting of the UN Security Council, which passed Resolution 660, condemning the invasion and demanding a withdrawal of Iraqi troops. On 3 August 1990, the Arab League passed a resolution, which called for a solution from within the league, and warned against outside intervention. Iraq and Libya were the only Arab League states that opposed the resolution for Iraq to withdraw; the Palestine Liberation Organization (PLO) (Note: Since 1988 the PLO had assumed, for Arab League purposes, the seat for the State of Palestine.) opposed it as well. Yemen and Jordan – a Western ally which bordered Iraq and relied on the country for economic support – opposed military intervention from non-Arab states. Separately, Sudan, also an Arab League member, aligned itself with Saddam.

On 6 August, Resolution 661 placed economic sanctions on Iraq. Resolution 665 followed soon after, which authorized a naval blockade to enforce the sanctions. It said the "use of measures commensurate to the specific circumstances as may be necessary ... to halt all inward and outward maritime shipping in order to inspect and verify their cargoes and destinations and to ensure strict implementation of resolution 661."

The US administration had at first been indecisive with an "undertone ... of resignation to the invasion and even adaptation to it as a fait accompli" until the UK's prime minister Thatcher played a powerful role, reminding the President that appeasement in the 1930s had led to war, that Saddam would have the whole Gulf at his mercy along with 65% of the world's oil supply, and famously urging Bush "not to go wobbly". Once persuaded, US officials insisted on Iraqi pullout, without any linkage to other Middle Eastern problems, accepting the British view that any concession would strengthen Iraqi influence.

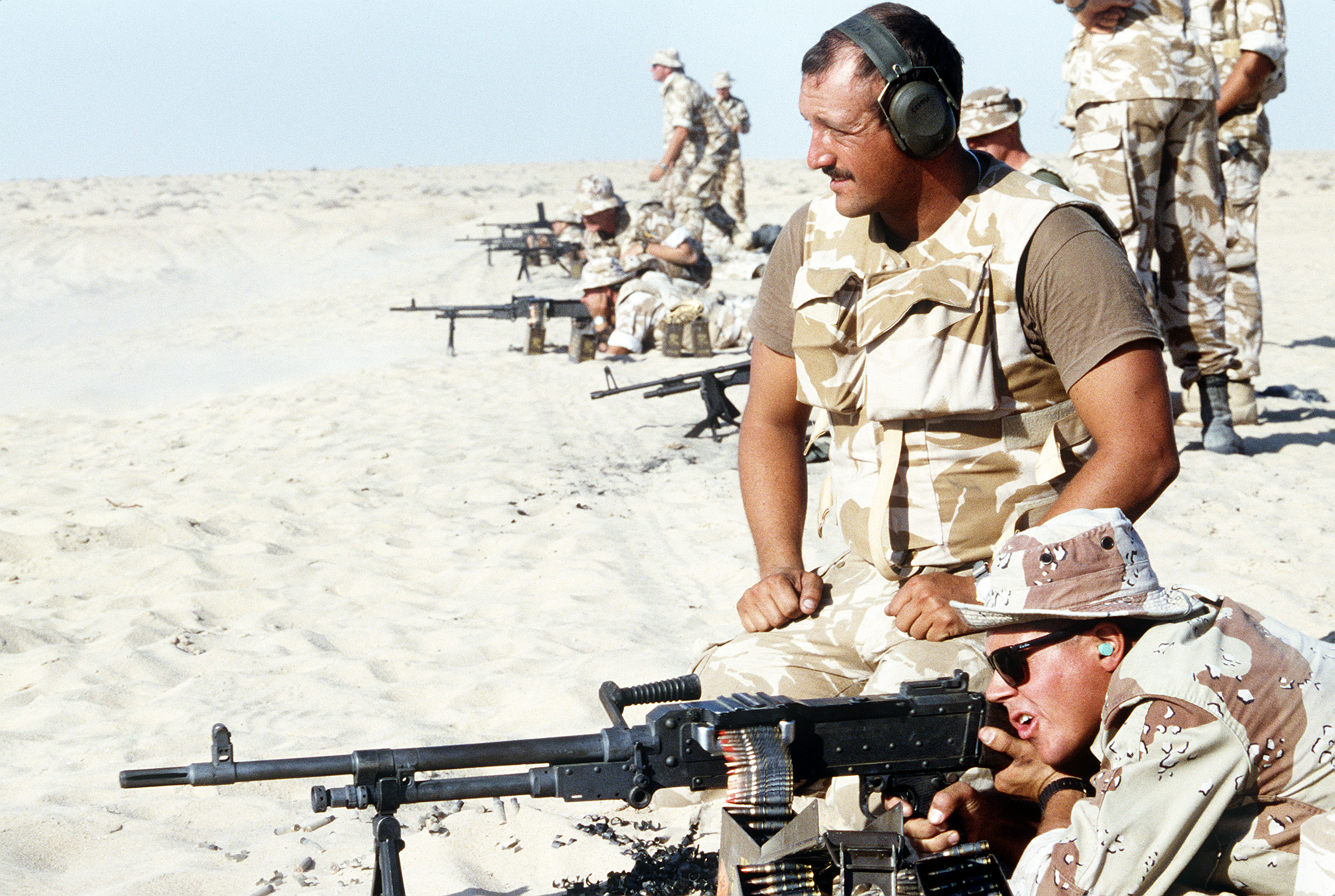
Weapons training at Abu Hydra Range, 1990

On 12 August 1990, Saddam "propose[d] that all cases of occupation, and those cases that have been portrayed as occupation, in the region, be resolved simultaneously". He called for Israel to withdraw from occupied territories in Palestine, Syria, and Lebanon, Syria to withdraw from Lebanon, and "mutual withdrawals by Iraq and Iran and arrangement for the situation in Kuwait." He called for a replacement of US troops, that mobilized in Saudi Arabia, with "an Arab force", as long as that force did not involve Egypt. He requested an "immediate freeze of all boycott and siege decisions" and a normalization of relations with Iraq. Bush was strongly opposed to any "linkage" between Iraq's occupation of Kuwait and the Palestinian issue.

On 23 August, Saddam appeared on state television with Western hostages to whom he had refused exit visas. In the video, he asks a British boy, Stuart Lockwood, whether he is getting his milk, and goes on to say, through his interpreter, "We hope your presence as guests here will not be for too long. Your presence here, and in other places, is meant to prevent the scourge of war."

Another Iraqi proposal communicated was delivered to US national security advisor Brent Scowcroft by an unidentified Iraqi official. The official communicated that Iraq would "withdraw from Kuwait and allow foreigners to leave" provided the UN lifted sanctions, allowed "guaranteed access to the Persian Gulf through the Kuwaiti islands of Bubiyan and Warbah", and allowed Iraq to "gain full control of the Rumaila oil field that extends slightly into Kuwaiti territory". The proposal also "include[d] offers to negotiate an oil agreement with the United States 'satisfactory to both nations' national security interests,' develop a joint plan 'to alleviate Iraq's economical and financial problems' and 'jointly work on the stability of the gulf.'"

On 29 November 1990, the Security Council passed Resolution 678, which gave Iraq until 15 January 1991 to withdraw from Kuwait, and empowered states to use "all necessary means" to force Iraq out of Kuwait after the deadline.

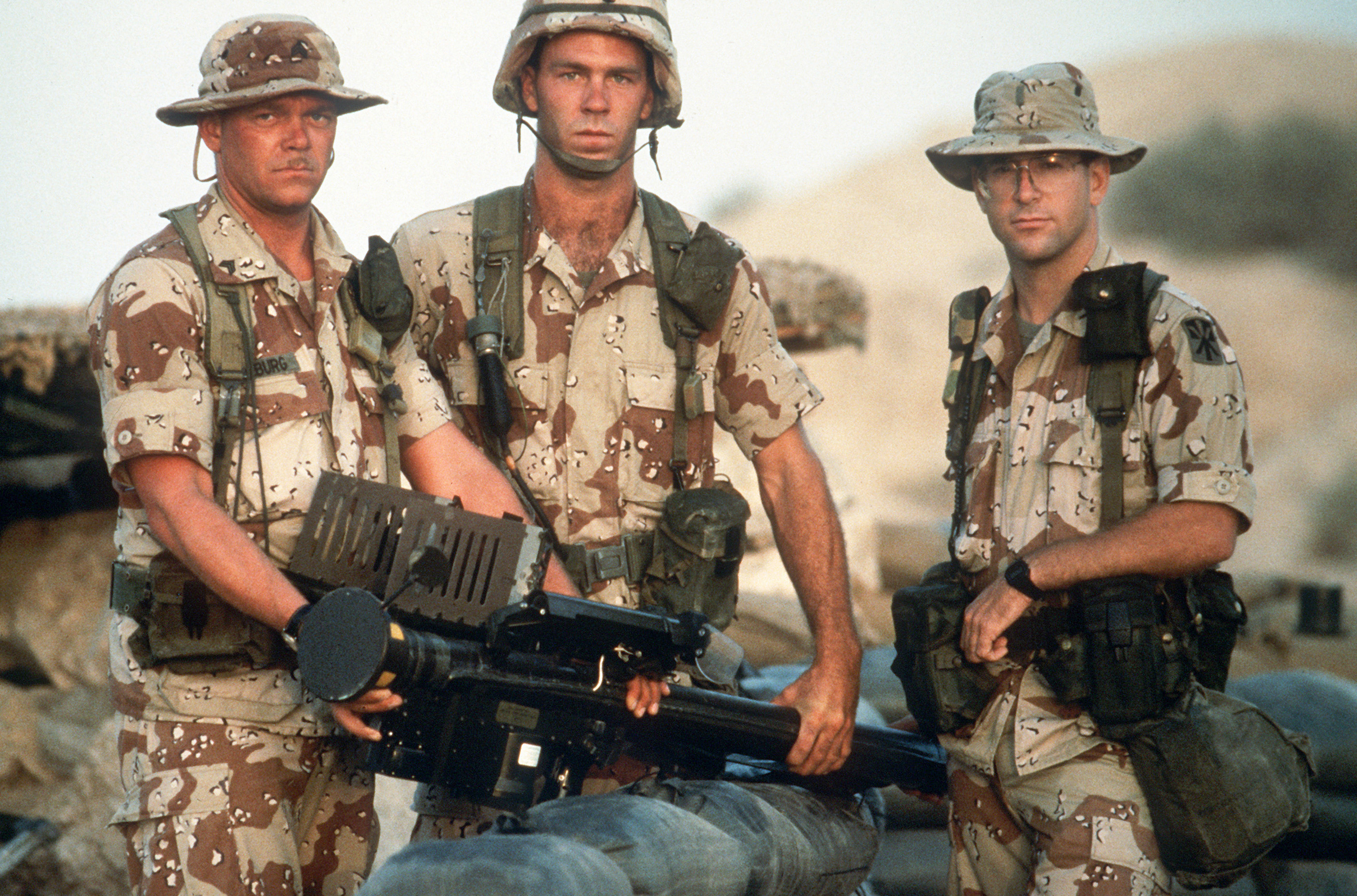
US Army soldiers from the 11th Air Defense Artillery Brigade during the Gulf War

In December 1990, Iraq made a proposal to withdraw from Kuwait provided foreign troops left the region and that an agreement was reached regarding the Palestinian problem and the dismantlement of Israel's and Iraq's weapons of mass destruction. The White House rejected the proposal. The PLO's Yasser Arafat expressed that neither he nor Saddam insisted that solving the Israel–Palestine issues should be a precondition to solving the issues in Kuwait, though he did acknowledge a "strong link" between these problems.

The US and UK stuck to their position there would be no negotiations until Iraq withdrew, and should not grant Iraq concessions, lest they give the impression Iraq benefited from its military campaign. When US secretary of state James Baker met with Tariq Aziz in Geneva, for last minute peace talks in early 1991, Aziz reportedly made no concrete proposals and did not outline any hypothetical Iraqi moves.

On 14 January 1991, France proposed that the UN Security Council call for "a rapid and massive withdrawal" from Kuwait along with a statement to Iraq that Council members would bring their "active contribution" to a settlement of the region's other problems, "in particular, of the Arab–Israeli conflict and in particular to the Palestinian problem by convening, at an appropriate moment, an international conference" to assure "the security, stability and development of this region of the world." The proposal was supported by Belgium, Germany, Spain, Italy, Algeria, Morocco, Tunisia, and several non-aligned states. The US, UK, and Soviet Union rejected it; US ambassador to the UN Thomas Pickering stated that the French proposal was unacceptable, because it went beyond Council resolutions on the Iraqi invasion. France dropped this proposal when it found "no tangible sign of interest" from Baghdad.

=== Military means ===
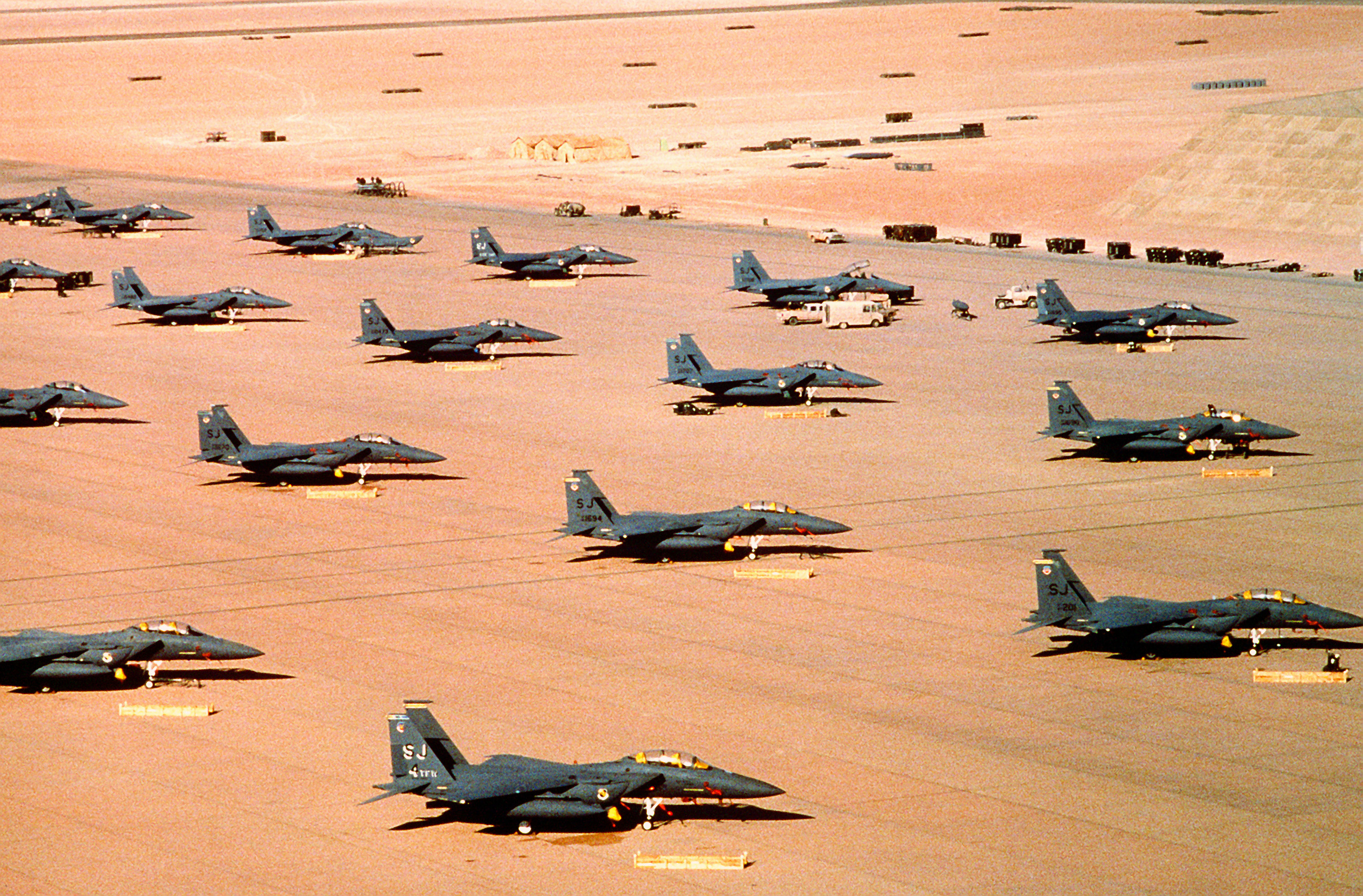
American F-15Es parked in Saudi Arabia during Operation Desert Shield

A concern in the Western world was the significant threat Iraq posed to Saudi Arabia. Following Kuwait's conquest, the Iraqi Army was within striking distance of Saudi oil fields. Control of these, along with Kuwaiti and Iraqi reserves, would have given Saddam control over most of the world's oil reserves. Iraq had grievances with Saudi Arabia. The Saudis had lent Iraq 26 billion dollars during its war with Iran, as the Saudis feared the influence of Shia Iran's Islamic revolution on its own Shia minority. When the war ended, Saddam felt he should not have to repay the loans due to the help he had given the Saudis by fighting Iran. After his conquest of Kuwait, Saddam verbally attacked the Saudis. He argued the US-supported Saudi state was an illegitimate and unworthy guardian of the holy cities of Mecca and Medina. He combined the language of the Islamist groups that had fought in Afghanistan with the rhetoric Iran had used to attack the Saudis.

Acting on the Carter Doctrine policy, and out of fear the Iraqi Army could invade Saudi Arabia, Bush announced that the US would launch a "wholly defensive" mission to prevent Iraq from invading Saudi Arabia, under the codename Operation Desert Shield. The operation began on 7 August 1990, when US troops were sent to Saudi Arabia, due also to the request of its monarch, King Fahd, who had called for US military assistance. This "wholly defensive" doctrine was quickly abandoned when, on 8 August, Iraq declared Kuwait to be Iraq's 19th province and Saddam named his cousin, Ali Hassan Al-Majid, as its governor.

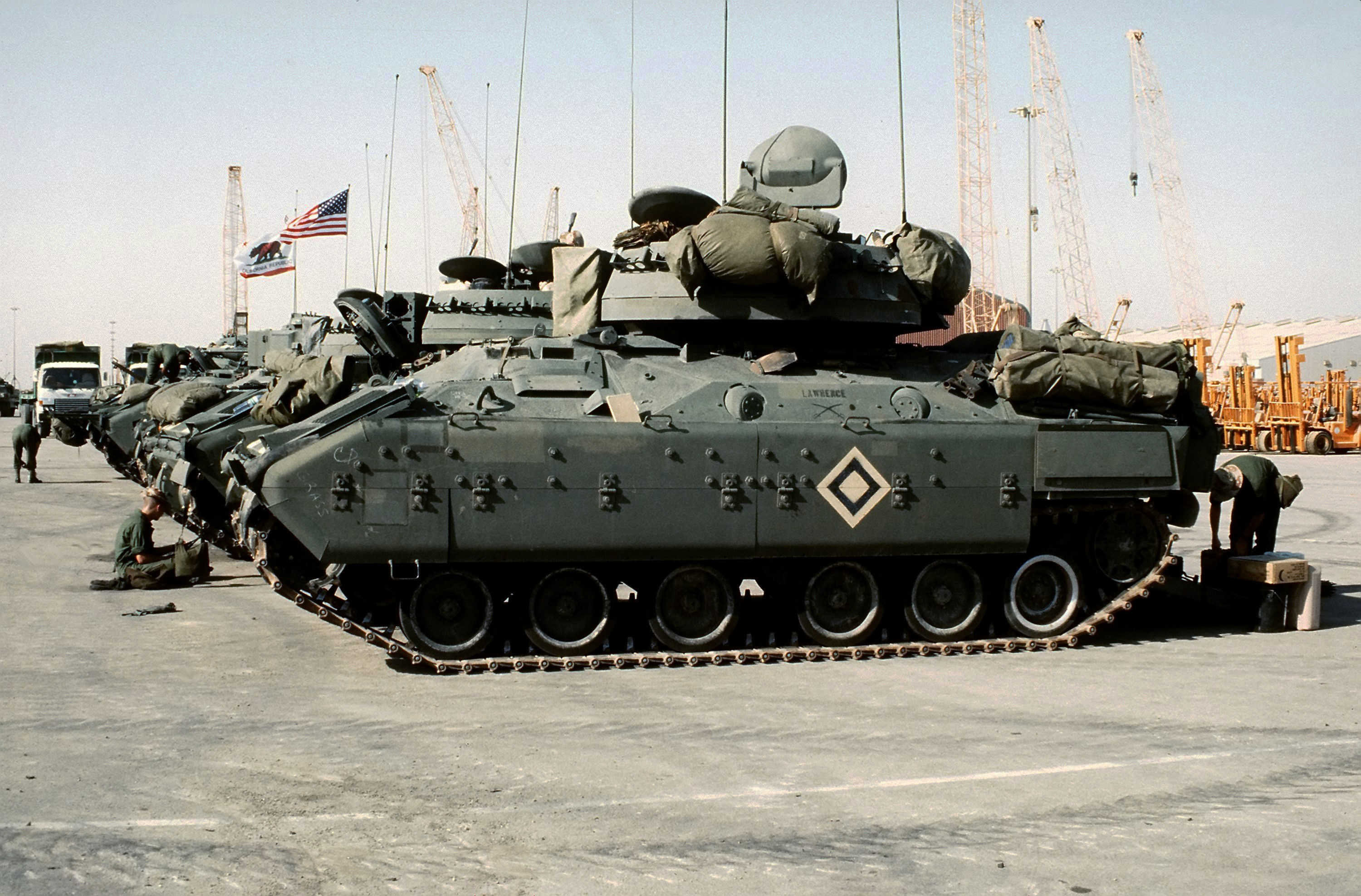
US M3 Bradleys stand in line at a holding area during the build-up to Operation Desert Shield.

The US Navy dispatched two naval battle groups built around the aircraft carriers USS Dwight D. Eisenhower and USS Independence to the Gulf, where they were ready by 8 August. The US sent the battleships USS Missouri and USS Wisconsin. 48 US Air Force F-15s from the 1st Fighter Wing at Langley Air Force Base, Virginia, landed in Saudi Arabia and commenced round-the-clock air patrols of the Saudi–Kuwait–Iraq border to discourage Iraqi military advances. They were joined by 36 F-15 A-Ds from the 36th Tactical Fighter Wing at Bitburg, Germany.

The Bitburg contingent was based at Al Kharj Air Base. The 36th shot down 11 Iraqi Air Force aircraft during the war. Two Air National Guard units were stationed at Al Kharj Air Base, the South Carolina Air National Guard's 169th Fighter Wing flew bombing missions with 24 F-16s flying 2,000 combat missions and dropping four million pounds (1,800,000 kilograms; 1,800 metric tons) of munitions, and the New York Air National Guard's 174th Fighter Wing from Syracuse flew 24 F-16s on bombing missions.

Military buildup continued, reaching 543,000 troops, twice that used in the 2003 invasion. Much of the material was airlifted or carried to the staging areas via fast sealift ships, allowing a quick buildup. Amphibious exercises were carried out in the Gulf, including Operation Imminent Thunder, which involved the USS Midway and 15 other ships, 1,100 aircraft, and a thousand Marines. In a press conference, General Schwarzkopf stated that these exercises were intended to deceive the Iraqi forces, forcing them to continue their defense of the Kuwaiti coastline.

=== Creating a coalition ===
Countries that deployed coalition forces or provided support. On behalf of Afghanistan, 300 Mujaheddin joined the coalition in February 1991. Niger contributed 480 troops to guard shrines in Mecca and Medina in January 1991.

"In 1990 members of the Bush administration ... cited Security Council resolutions as sufficient support for the President to act militarily against Iraq without congressional authority." A series of UN Security Council resolutions and Arab League resolutions were passed regarding Iraq's invasion of Kuwait. Resolution 678, passed on 29 November 1990, gave Iraq a withdrawal deadline until 15 January 1991 and authorized "all necessary means to uphold and implement Resolution 660", and a diplomatic formulation authorizing the use of force if Iraq failed to comply.

To ensure the US received economic backing, James Baker went on an 11-day journey to nine countries in September 1990, which the press dubbed "The Tin Cup Trip". The first stop was Saudi Arabia, which had already granted permission to the US to use its facilities. Baker believed that Saudi Arabia should assume some of the cost of to defend it. When Baker asked King Fahd for $15 billion, the King agreed, with the promise that Baker ask Kuwait for the same amount.

The next day, 7 September, Baker did just that, and the emir of Kuwait, displaced in a Sheraton hotel outside Kuwait, agreed. Baker moved to enter talks with Egypt, whose leadership he considered "the moderate voice of the Middle East". President Mubarak was furious with Saddam for his invasion, and that Saddam had assured Mubarak that an invasion was not his intention. Egypt received approximately $7 billion in debt forgiveness for providing support and troops for the US-led intervention.

After stops in Helsinki and Moscow to smooth out Iraqi demands for a Middle-Eastern peace conference with the Soviet Union, Baker traveled to Syria to discuss its role with President Hafez Assad. Assad had a personal enmity towards Saddam, as "Saddam had been trying to kill him [Assad] for years." Harboring this animosity and impressed with Baker's initiative to visit Damascus (relations had been severed since the 1983 bombing of US barracks), Assad agreed to pledge up to 100,000 Syrian troops to the coalition. This was a vital step in ensuring Arab states were represented in the coalition. In exchange, Washington gave al-Assad the green light to wipe out forces opposing Syria's rule in Lebanon and arranged for weapons valued at a billion dollars to be provided to Syria, mostly through Gulf states. In exchange for Iran's support for the US-led intervention, the US promised Iran to end US opposition to World Bank loans to Iran. On the day before the coalition ground invasion, the World Bank gave Iran the first loan of $250m.

Baker flew to Rome for a meeting with the Italians in which he was promised the use of military equipment, before journeying to Germany to meet with American ally Chancellor Kohl. Although Germany's constitution (brokered by the US) prohibited military involvement outside Germany's borders, Kohl committed a two billion dollar contribution to the war effort, and further economic and military support of coalition ally Turkey, and the transportation of Egyptian soldiers and ships to the Gulf.

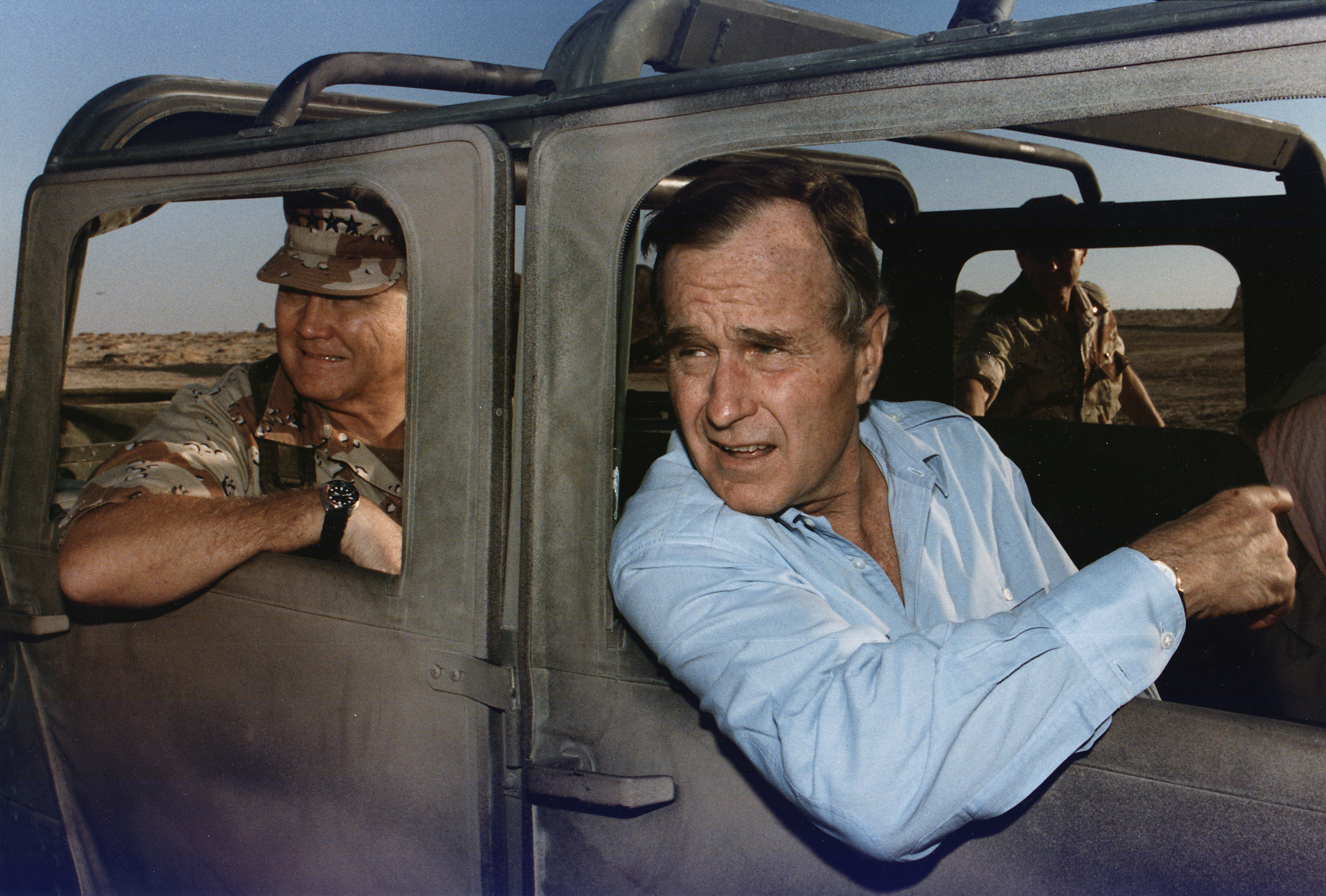
General Norman Schwarzkopf, Jr. and President George H. W. Bush visit US troops in Saudi Arabia on Thanksgiving Day, 1990.

A coalition of forces opposing Iraq's aggression was formed, consisting of forces from 42 countries: Argentina, Australia, Bahrain, Bangladesh, Belgium, Canada, Czechoslovakia, Denmark, Egypt, France, Germany, Greece, Honduras, Hungary, Italy, Japan, Kuwait, Luxembourg, Morocco, the Netherlands, New Zealand, Niger, Norway, Oman, Pakistan, the Philippines, Poland, Portugal, Qatar, Romania, Saudi Arabia, Senegal, Sierra Leone, Singapore, South Korea, Spain, Sweden, Syria, Turkey, the United Arab Emirates, the UK and US.

It was the largest coalition since World War II. A group of Afghan mujahideen soldiers also reportedly joined towards the end of the war. Although they did not contribute forces, Japan and Germany made financial contributions totaling $10 billion and $6.6 billion respectively. Luxembourg provided financial support. US troops represented 73% of the coalition's 956,600 troops in Iraq. A pact between the Indian government and the US also allowed US C-141 aircraft flying in materials from the Philippines to stop in Mumbai to refuel, which led to disquiet within most of the nation's formerly pro-Iraqi stance.

US Army General Norman Schwarzkopf, Jr. was designated to be the commander of the coalition forces. The Soviet Union condemned Baghdad's aggression against Kuwait, but did not support the US and allied intervention in Iraq and tried to avert it. Many of the coalition countries were reluctant to commit military forces. Some felt that the war was an internal Arab affair or did not want to increase US influence in the Middle East. In the end, however, many governments were persuaded by Iraq's belligerence towards other Arab states, offers of economic aid or debt forgiveness, and threats to withhold aid.

==== Justification for intervention ====
The US and UN gave public justifications for involvement in the conflict, the most prominent being the Iraqi violation of Kuwaiti territorial integrity. In addition, the US moved to support its ally Saudi Arabia, whose importance in the region, and as a key supplier of oil, made it of considerable geopolitical importance. Shortly after the Iraqi invasion, US defense secretary Dick Cheney made the first of several visits to Saudi Arabia where King Fahd requested US military assistance. During a speech in a special joint session of the US Congress given on 11 September 1990, Bush summed up the reasons with the following remarks: "Within three days, 120,000 Iraqi troops with 850 tanks had poured into Kuwait and moved south to threaten Saudi Arabia. It was then that I decided to act to check that aggression."

The Pentagon stated that satellite photos showing a buildup of Iraqi forces along the border were the source of this information, but this was later alleged to be false. A reporter for the St. Petersburg Times acquired commercial Soviet satellite images which showed nothing but empty desert.

Other justifications for foreign involvement included Iraq's history of human rights abuses under Saddam. Iraq was known to possess biological weapons and chemical weapons, which Saddam had used against Iranian troops during the Iran–Iraq War and his own country's Kurdish population in the Al-Anfal campaign. Iraq was known to have a nuclear weapons program; the report about it from January 1991 was partially declassified by the CIA in May 2001.

==== Public relations campaign targeting the public ====
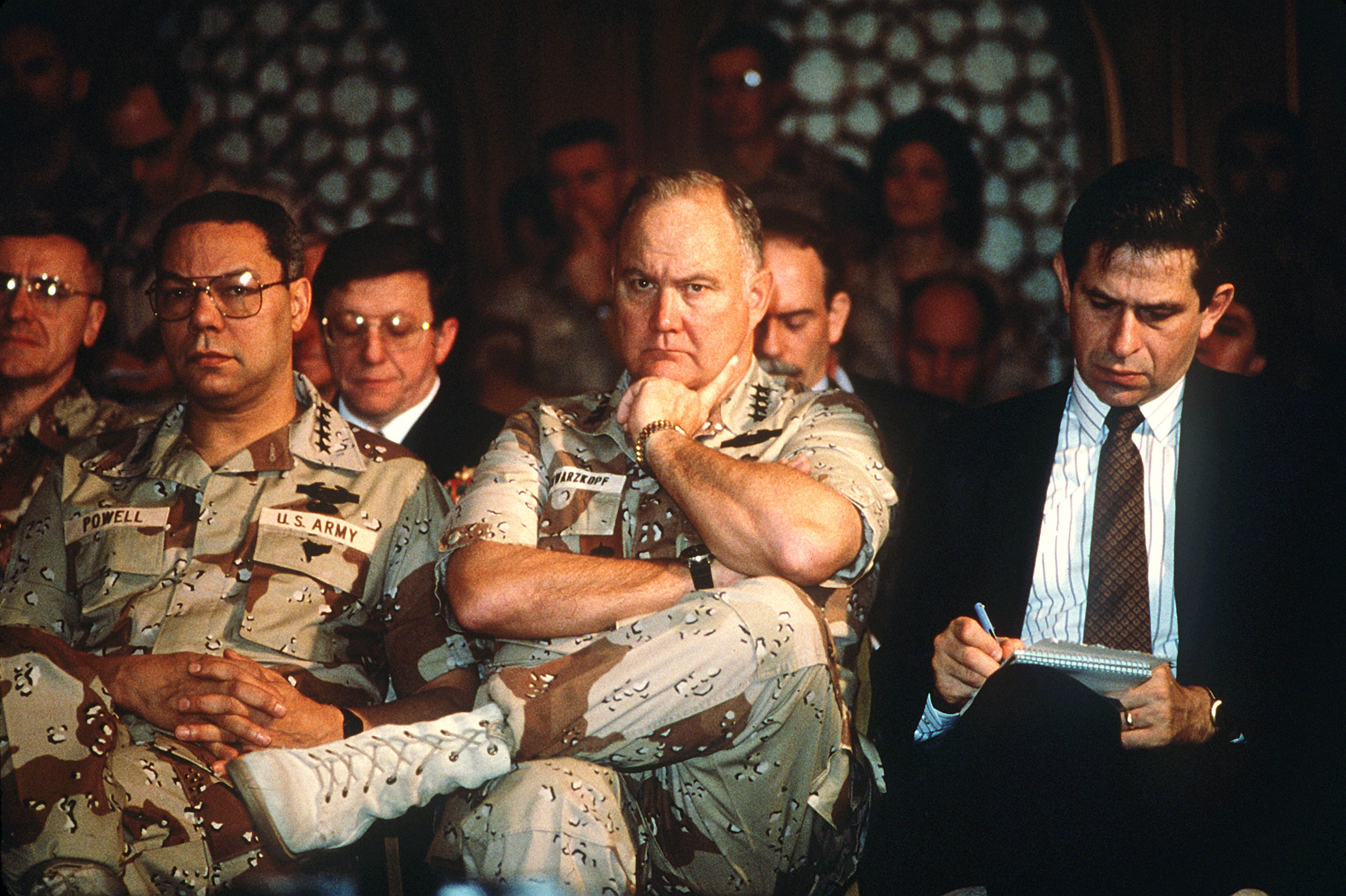
Gen. Colin Powell (left), Gen. Norman Schwarzkopf Jr., and Paul Wolfowitz (right) listen as Secretary of Defense Dick Cheney addresses reporters regarding the 1991 Gulf War.

Although the Iraqi military committed human rights abuses during the invasion, the alleged incidents that received the most publicity in the US were fabrications of the public relations firm hired by the government of Kuwait to persuade Americans to support military intervention. Shortly after Iraq's invasion of Kuwait, the organization Citizens for a Free Kuwait was formed in the US. It hired the public relations firm Hill & Knowlton for about $11 million, paid by Kuwait's government.

Among many other means of influencing US opinion, such as distributing books on Iraqi atrocities to US soldiers deployed, "Free Kuwait" T-shirts and speakers to college campuses, and video news releases to television stations, the firm arranged for an appearance before members of the US Congress in which a young woman identifying herself as a nurse working in the Kuwait City hospital described Iraqi soldiers pulling babies out of incubators and letting them die on the floor.

The story helped tip the public and Congress towards a war with Iraq: six Congressmen said the testimony was enough for them to support military action against Iraq and seven Senators referenced the testimony in debate. The Senate supported the military actions in a 52–47 vote. However, a year after the war, this allegation was revealed to be a fabrication. The young woman was found to be a member of Kuwait's royal family and the daughter of Kuwait's ambassador to the US. She had not lived in Kuwait during the Iraqi invasion.

The details of the Hill & Knowlton public relations campaign, including the incubator testimony, were published in John R. MacArthur's Second Front: Censorship and Propaganda in the Gulf War, and came to public attention when an Op-ed by MacArthur was published in The New York Times. This prompted a reexamination by Amnesty International, which had promoted an account alleging even greater numbers of babies torn from incubators than the fake testimony. After finding no evidence to support it, the organization issued a retraction. Bush repeated the incubator allegations on television.

The Iraqi Army did commit well-documented crimes during its occupation, such as the summary execution without trial of three brothers, after which their bodies were stacked and left to decay in a street. Iraqi troops ransacked and looted private homes; one residence was repeatedly defecated in. A resident later commented: "The whole thing was violence for the sake of violence, destruction for the sake of destruction ... Imagine a surrealistic painting by Salvador Dalí". Bush repeatedly compared Saddam Hussein to Hitler.

== Early battles ==
=== Air campaign ===
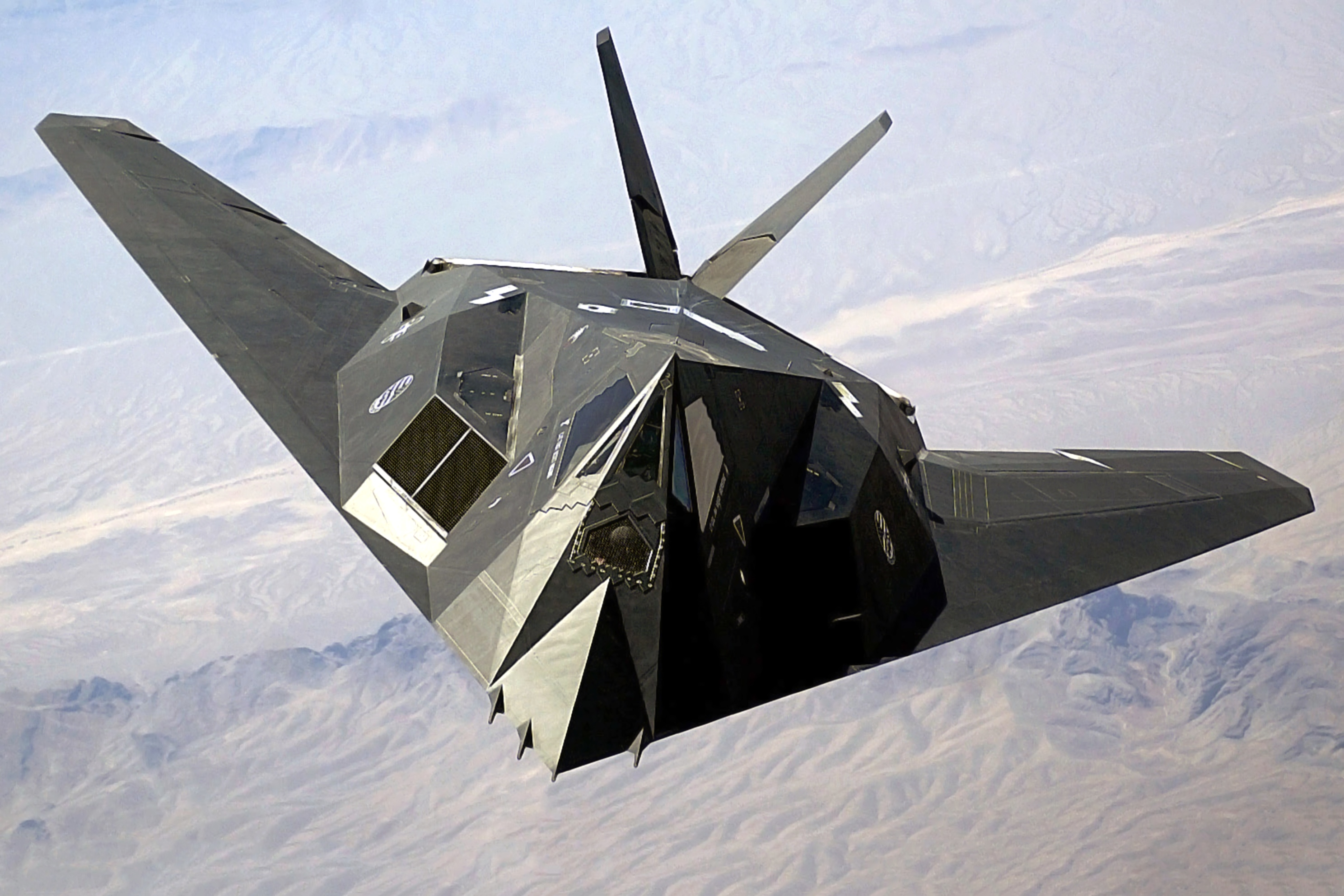
The USAF F-117 Nighthawk, one of the key aircraft used in Operation Desert Storm

The Gulf War began with an extensive aerial bombing campaign on 16 January 1991. For 42 consecutive days and nights, the coalition forces subjected Iraq to one of the most intensive air bombardments in military history. The coalition flew over 100,000 sorties, dropping 88,500 tonnes of bombs, which widely destroyed military and civilian infrastructure.

Iraqi anti-aircraft defenses, including man-portable air-defense systems, were surprisingly ineffective against enemy aircraft, and the coalition suffered only 75 aircraft losses in over 100,000 sorties, 44 due to Iraqi action. Two of these losses are the result of aircraft colliding with the ground while evading Iraqi ground-fired weapons. One of these losses is a confirmed air-air victory.

=== Iraqi Scud missile strikes on Israel and Saudi Arabia ===
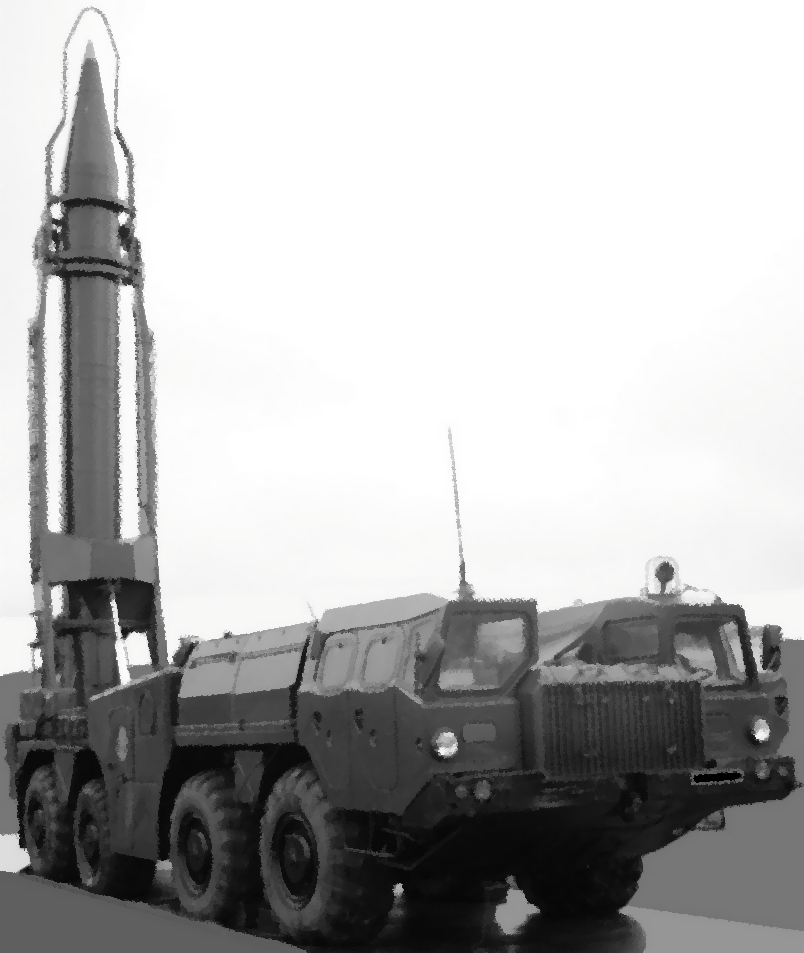
A Scud Transporter Erector Launcher (TEL) with missile in the upright position

Iraq's government made no secret that it would attack Israel if invaded. Prior to the war's start, in the aftermath of the failed US–Iraq peace talks in Geneva, Switzerland, a reporter asked Iraq's English-speaking foreign minister and deputy prime minister Tariq Aziz: "Mr. Foreign Minister, if war starts ... will you attack Israel?" His response was: "Yes, absolutely, yes."

Five hours after the first attacks, Iraq's state radio broadcast declared that "The dawn of victory nears as this great showdown begins." Iraq fired eight missiles the next day. These missile attacks were to continue throughout the war. Iraq fired 88 Scud missiles during the war's seven weeks.

Iraq hoped to provoke a military response from Israel. The Iraqi government hoped that many Arab states would withdraw from the Coalition, as they would be reluctant to fight alongside Israel. Following the first attacks, Israeli Air Force jets were deployed to patrol the northern airspace with Iraq. Israel prepared to militarily retaliate, as its policy for the previous 40 years had always been retaliation. President Bush pressured Israeli prime minister Yitzhak Shamir not to retaliate and withdraw Israeli jets, fearing that if Israel attacked Iraq, the other Arab states would either desert the coalition or join Iraq. It was also feared that if Israel used Syrian or Jordanian airspace to attack Iraq, they would intervene in the war on Iraq's side or attack Israel. The coalition promised to deploy Patriot missiles to defend Israel if it refrained from responding to the Scud attacks.

The Scud missiles targeting Israel were relatively ineffective, as firing at extreme range resulted in a dramatic reduction in accuracy and payload. Two Israeli civilians died as a direct result of the missile attacks. Between 11 and 74 died from incorrect use of gas masks, heart attacks, and incorrect use of the anti-chemical weapons drug atropine. Approximately 230 Israelis were injured. Extensive property damage was also caused, and, according to the Israel Ministry of Foreign Affairs, "Damage to general property consisted of 1,302 houses, 6,142 apartments, 23 public buildings, 200 shops and 50 cars."

It was feared that Iraq would fire missiles filled with nerve agents such as sarin. As a result, Israel's government issued gas masks to its citizens. When the first Iraqi missiles hit Israel, some people injected themselves with an antidote for nerve gas. It has been suggested that the sturdy construction techniques used in Israeli cities, coupled with the fact that Scuds were only launched at night, played an important role in limiting the number of casualties from Scud attacks.

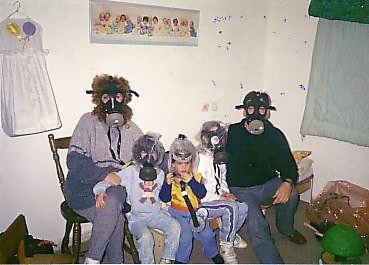
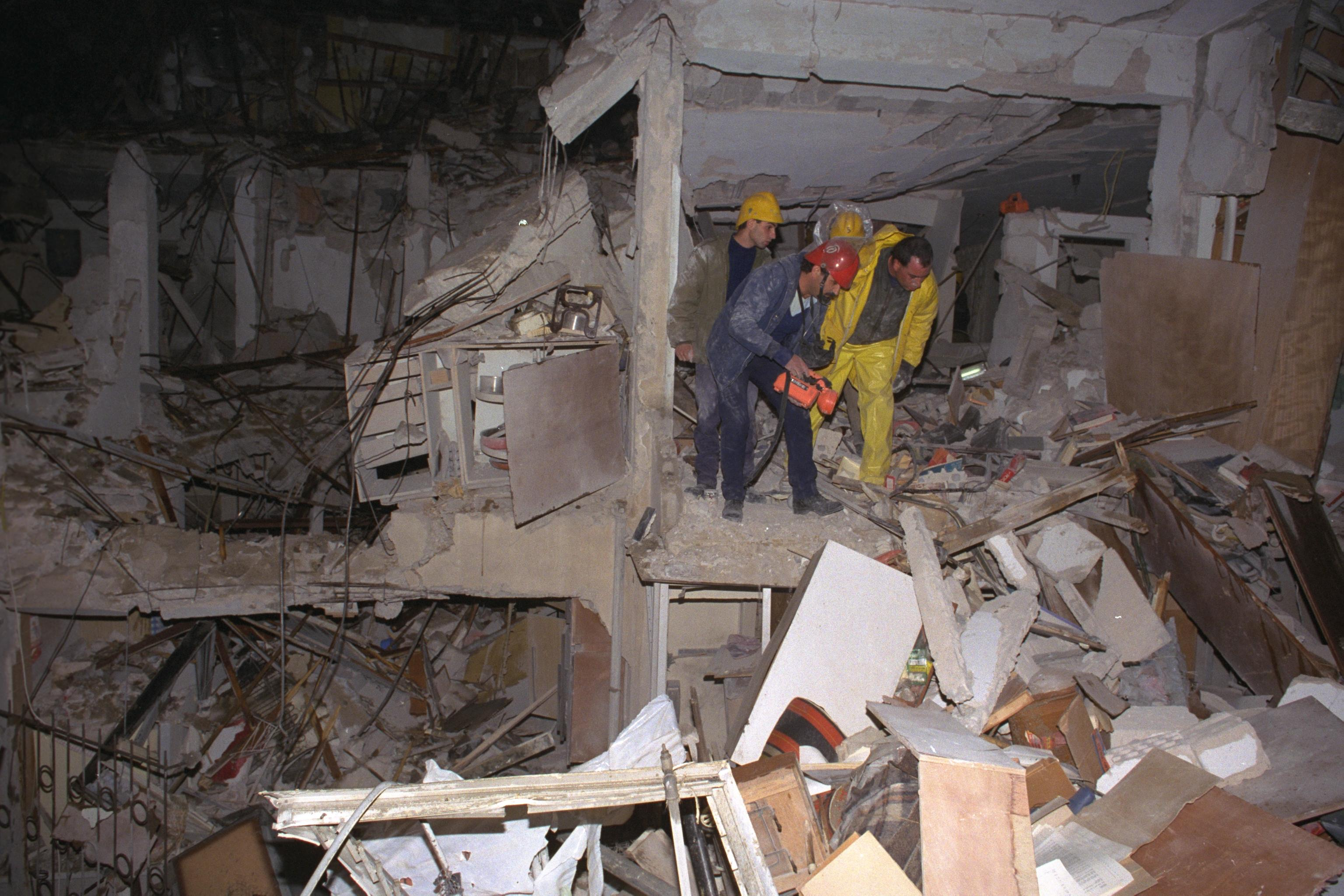
Israeli civilians taking shelter from missiles (top) and aftermath of attack in Ramat Gan, Israel (bottom)

In response to the threat of Scuds on Israel, the US rapidly sent a Patriot missile air defense artillery battalion to Israel along with two batteries of MIM-104 Patriot missiles for the protection of civilians. The Royal Netherlands Air Force also deployed a Patriot missile squadron to Israel and Turkey. The Dutch Defense Ministry later stated that the military use of the Patriot missile system was largely ineffective, but its psychological value for the affected populations was high.

Coalition air forces were also extensively exercised in "Scud hunts" in the Iraqi desert, trying to locate the camouflaged trucks before they fired their missiles at Israel or Saudi Arabia. On the ground, special operations forces infiltrated Iraq, tasked with locating and destroying Scuds – including the ill-fated Bravo Two Zero patrol of the SAS. Once special operations were combined with air patrols, the number of attacks fell sharply, then increased slightly as Iraqi forces adjusted to coalition tactics.

As the Scud attacks continued, the Israelis grew increasingly impatient, and considered taking unilateral military action against Iraq. On 22 January 1991, a Scud missile hit the Israeli city of Ramat Gan, after two coalition Patriots failed to intercept it. Three elderly people suffered fatal heart attacks, another 96 people were injured, and 20 apartment buildings were damaged. After this attack, the Israelis warned that if the US failed to stop the attacks, they would. At one point, Israeli commandos boarded helicopters prepared to fly into Iraq, but the mission was called off after a phone call from US defense secretary Dick Cheney, reporting on the extent of coalition efforts to destroy Scuds and emphasizing that Israeli intervention could endanger US forces.

47 Scud missiles were fired into Saudi Arabia, and one missile was fired at Bahrain and another at Qatar. The missiles were fired at both military and civilian targets. One Saudi civilian was killed, and 78 others were injured. No casualties were reported in Bahrain or Qatar. The Saudi government issued all its citizens and expatriates with gas masks in the event of Iraq using missiles with warheads containing chemical weapons. The government broadcast alerts and 'all clear' messages over television to warn citizens during Scud attacks.

On 25 February 1991, a Scud missile hit a US Army barracks of the 14th Quartermaster Detachment, out of Greensburg, Pennsylvania, stationed in Dhahran, Saudi Arabia, killing 28 soldiers and injuring over 100. An investigation found that the assigned Patriot missile battery had failed to engage due to the loss of significance effect in the onboard computer's floating point calculations compounding over 100 hours of consecutive use, shifting the range gate position far enough to lose contact with the Scud during tracking action.

=== Iraqi invasion of Saudi Arabia (Battle of Khafji) ===
Military operations during Khafji's liberation

On 29 January, Iraqi forces attacked and occupied the lightly defended Saudi city of Khafji with tanks and infantry. The Battle of Khafji ended two days later when the Iraqis were driven back by the Saudi Arabian National Guard, supported by Qatari forces and US Marines. The allied forces used extensive artillery fire.

Both sides suffered casualties, although Iraqi forces sustained substantially more dead and captured than the allied forces. Eleven Americans were killed in two separate friendly fire incidents, and 14 US airmen were killed when their AC-130 gunship was shot down by an Iraqi surface-to-air missile, and two US soldiers were captured during the battle. Saudi and Qatari forces had a total of 18 dead. Iraqi forces in Khafji had 60–300 dead and 400 captured.

The Battle of Khafji was an example of how air power could single-handedly hinder the advance of enemy ground forces. Upon learning of Iraqi troop movements, 140 coalition aircraft were diverted to attack an advancing column consisting of two armored divisions in battalion-sized units. Precision stand-off attacks were conducted during the night and through to the next day. Iraqi vehicle losses included 357 tanks, 147 armored personnel carriers, and 89 mobile artillery pieces. Some crews simply abandoned their vehicles upon realizing that they could be destroyed by guided bombs, stopping the divisions from massing for an organized attack on the town. One Iraqi soldier, who had fought in the Iran–Iraq War, remarked that his brigade "had sustained more punishment from allied airpower in 30 minutes at Khafji than in eight years of fighting against Iran."

== Counter reconnaissance for 2nd Armored Division ==
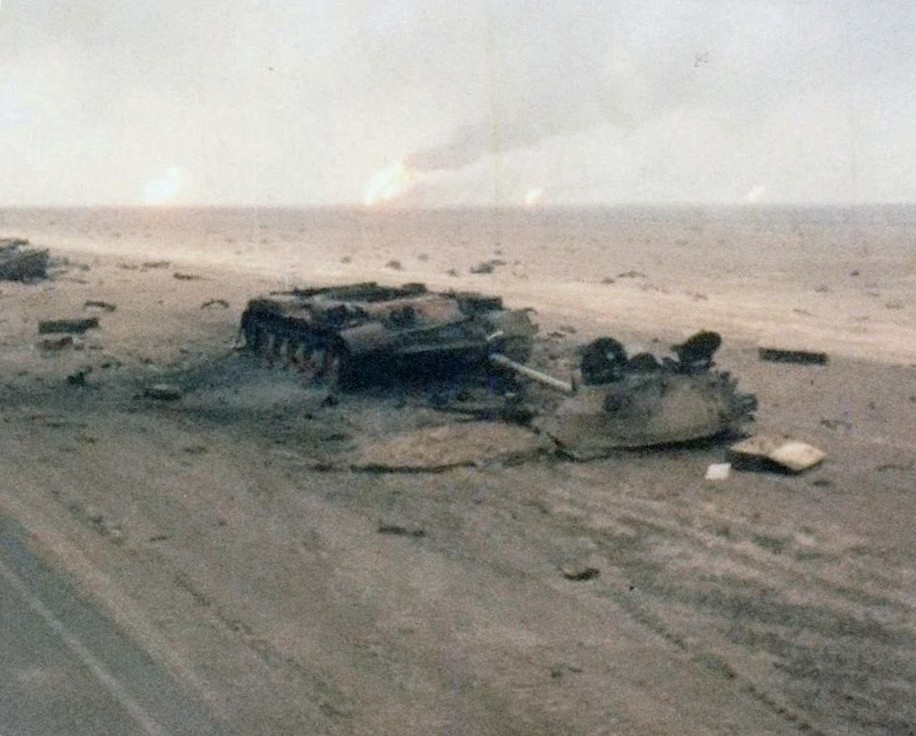
Iraqi tanks destroyed by Task Force 1-41 Infantry, February 1991

Task Force 1-41 Infantry was a US Army heavy battalion task force from the 2nd Armored Division (Forward). The 2nd Armored Division (Forward) included the 1st Battalion, 41st Infantry Regiment, the 2nd and 3rd Battalions, 66th Armor Regiment, and the 4th Battalion, 3rd Field Artillery Regiment. Task Force 1–41 was the first coalition force to breach the Saudi Arabian border on 15 February 1991, and to conduct ground combat operations in Iraq against the enemy on 17 February 1991. Shortly after arrival in theatre "..the battalion received, for planning, a brigade cross-boundary counter-reconnaissance mission."

1–41 Infantry was assisted by the 1st Squadron, 4th Armored Cavalry Regiment. This joint effort became known as Task Force Iron. Counter-reconnaissance generally includes destroying or repelling the enemy's reconnaissance elements and denying their commander any observation of friendly forces. On 15 February 1991 4th Battalion of the 3rd Field Artillery Regiment fired on a trailer and a few trucks in the Iraqi sector observing American forces.

On 16 February 1991 several groups of Iraqi vehicles appeared to be performing reconnaissance on the Task Force and were driven away by fire from 4–3 FA. Another enemy platoon, including six vehicles, was reported as being to the northeast of the Task Force. They were engaged with artillery fire from 4–3 FA. Later that evening another group of Iraqi vehicles was spotted moving towards the center of the Task Force. They appeared to be Iraqi Soviet-made BTRs and tanks. For the next hour the Task Force fought several small battles with Iraqi reconnaissance units. TF 1–41 IN fired TOW missiles at the Iraqi formation, destroying one tank. The rest of the formation was destroyed or driven away by artillery fire from 4–3 FA.

On 17 February, the Task Force took Iraqi mortar fire, and the Iraqi forces managed to escape. Later that evening the Task Force received Iraqi artillery fire but suffered no casualties. That same evening the Task Force identified an Iraqi mortar position and engaged it with both direct and indirect fires. The Iraqis continued probing operations against the Task Force for approximately two hours. For the next two days the Task Force observed Iraqi wheeled vehicles and small units move in front of them. Several times Iraqi mortars fired on Task Force 1–41 Infantry positions.

On 18 February Iraqi mortar positions continued to conduct fire missions against the Task Force. The Task Force returned fire on the Iraqi positions with artillery fire from 4–3 FA and 1st Infantry Division Artillery. During the Iraqi mortar attacks two American soldiers were wounded. Iraqi reconnaissance elements continued to patrol the area between the Task Force and the 1st Cavalry Division. VII Corps air units and artillery conducted combat operations against Iraqi defensive positions.

== Breach ==
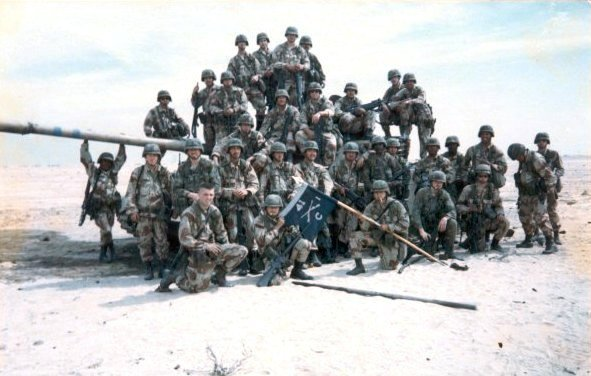
Soldiers of 2nd Platoon, Company C, 1st Battalion, 41st Infantry Regiment pose with a captured Iraqi tank, February 1991

On 15 February 1991, Task Force 1–41 Infantry was the first coalition force to breach the Saudi Arabian border and conduct ground combat operations in Iraq engaging in direct and indirect fire fights with the enemy on 17 February 1991. Prior to this action the Task Force's primary fire support battalion, 4th Battalion of the 3rd Field Artillery Regiment, participated in a massive artillery preparation. Around 300 guns from multiple countries participated in the artillery barrage. Over 14,000 rounds were fired during these missions. M270 Multiple Launch Rocket Systems contributed an additional 4,900 rockets fired at Iraqi targets. Iraq lost close to 22 artillery battalions during the initial stages of this barrage, including the destruction of approximately 396 Iraqi artillery pieces.

By the end of these raids Iraqi artillery assets had all but ceased to exist. One Iraqi unit that was totally destroyed during the preparation was the Iraqi 48th Infantry Division Artillery Group. The group's commander stated his unit lost 83 of its 100 guns to the artillery preparation. The artillery bombardment was supplemented by Boeing B-52 Stratofortress bombing raids and Lockheed AC-130 attacks. AH-64 Apache attack helicopters from the 1st Infantry Division and B-52 bombers attacked the Iraqi 110th Infantry Brigade. Under enemy fire, the 1st and 9th Engineer Battalions marked and proofed assault lanes to secure a foothold in enemy territory and pass the 1st Infantry Division and the 1st Armoured Division forward.

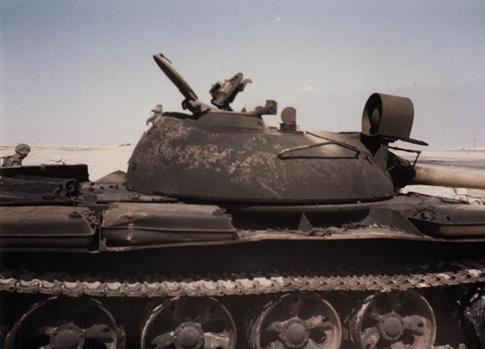
An Iraqi Republican Guard T-55 tank destroyed by Task Force 1–41 Infantry, February 1991

On 24 February 1991 the 1st Cavalry Division fired its artillery against Iraqi artillery units. One artillery mission struck a series of Iraqi bunkers, reinforced by Iraqi T-55 tanks, in the sector of the Iraqi 25th Infantry Division. The same day the 2nd Brigade, 1st Cavalry Division with the 1st Battalion, 5th Cavalry, 1st Battalion, 32nd Armor, and the 1st Battalion, 8th Cavalry destroyed Iraqi bunkers and combat vehicles in the sector of the Iraqi 25th Infantry Division. On 24 February 2nd Brigade, 1st Infantry Division rolled through the breach in the Iraqi defense west of Wadi al-Batin and cleared the northeastern sector of the breach site of enemy resistance.

Task Force 3–37th Armor breached the Iraqi defense, clearing four passage lanes and expanding the gap under direct enemy fire. Also on 24 February the 1st Infantry Division and the 1st Cavalry Division destroyed Iraqi outposts and patrols belonging to the Iraqi 26th Infantry Division. The two divisions began capturing prisoners. The 1st Infantry Division cleared a zone between Phase Line Vermont and Phase Line Kansas. Once the 1st Infantry Division's 3rd Battalion, 37th Armor reached the Iraqi rear defensive positions, it destroyed an Iraqi D-30 artillery battery and many trucks and bunkers.

Task Force 1–41 Infantry was given the task of breaching Iraq's initial defensive positions along the Iraq–Saudi Arabia border. The 1st Squadron, 4th Armored Cavalry Regiment handled similar responsibilities in its sector of operations. The 1st Infantry Division's 5th Battalion, 16th Infantry also played a significant role clearing the trenches and captured 160 Iraqi soldiers in the process. Once into Iraqi territory Task Force 1–41 Infantry encountered multiple Iraqi defensive positions and bunkers. These defensive positions were occupied by a brigade-sized element.

Task Force 1–41 Infantry elements dismounted and prepared to engage the enemy soldiers who occupied these well-prepared and heavily fortified bunkers. The Task Force found itself engaged in six hours of combat in order to clear the extensive bunker complex. The Iraqis engaged the Task Force with small arms fire, RPGs, mortar fire, and what was left of Iraqi artillery assets. A series of battles unfolded resulting in heavy Iraqi casualties and the Iraqis being removed from their defensive positions with many becoming prisoners of war. Some escaped to be killed or captured by other coalition forces.

In the process of clearing the bunkers, Task Force 1–41 captured two brigade command posts and the command post of the Iraqi 26th Infantry Division. The Task Force captured a brigade commander, several battalion commanders, company commanders, and staff officers. As combat operations progressed, Task Force 1–41 Infantry engaged at short range multiple dug in enemy tanks in ambush positions. For a few hours, bypassed Iraqi RPG-equipped anti-tank teams, T-55 tanks, and dismounted Iraqi infantry fired at passing American vehicles, only to be destroyed by other US tanks and fighting vehicles following the initial forces. The 1st Infantry Division's Task Force 2–16 Infantry cleared four lanes simultaneously through an enemy fortified trench system while inflicting heavy casualties on Iraqi forces. Task Force 2–16 continued the attack clearing over 21 km (13 mi) of entrenched enemy positions resulting in the capture and destruction of numerous enemy vehicles, equipment, personnel and command bunkers.

== Ground campaign ==
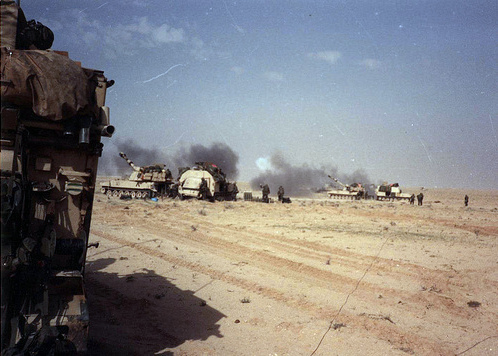
M109 howitzers belonging to 4th Battalion of the 3rd Field Artillery Regiment, 2nd Armored Division (FWD) conducts artillery strikes on Iraqi positions during the Gulf War. 4-3 FA was the primary fire support battalion for Task Force 1–41 during the Gulf War, February 1991.

A 90,000 round artillery preparation fire on Iraqi defensive positions preceded the major ground assault, lasting 2.5 hours. 1st Infantry Division Artillery, which included 4-3 FA battalion, was decisive during artillery combat operations performing multiple raids and fire missions. These combat operations resulted in the destruction of 50 enemy tanks, 139 APCs, 30 air defense systems, 152 artillery pieces, 27 missile launchers, 108 mortars, and 548 wheeled vehicles, 61 trench lines and bunker positions, 92 dug in and open infantry targets, and 34 logistical sites. The ground campaign consisted of three or possibly four of the largest tank battles in American military history. The battles at 73 Easting, Norfolk, and Medina Ridge are well noted for their historical significance. Some consider the Battle of Medina Ridge the largest tank battle of the war. Other sources consider the Battle of Norfolk the largest tank battle of the war and the second-largest tank battle in American military history, behind the Battle of the Bulge. The U.S. Marine Corps also fought the biggest tank battle in its history at Kuwait International Airport. The U.S. 3rd Armored Division also fought a significant battle at Objective Dorset not far from where the Battle of Norfolk was taking place. The U.S. 3rd Armored Division destroyed approximately 300 enemy combat vehicles during this particular encounter with Iraqi forces.

The U.S. VII Corps was the primary combat formation of the coalition forces. It was a formidable fighting force consisting of 1,487 tanks, 1,384 infantry fighting vehicles, 568 artillery pieces, 132 MLRS, 8 missile launchers, and 242 attack helicopters. It had a total troop strength of 146,321 troops. Its primary full strength fighting formations were the 1st Armored Division (United States), the 3rd Armored Division (United States) and the 1st Infantry Division (United States). The 2nd Armored Division (Forward) was assigned to the 1st Infantry Division as its third maneuver brigade. Its Task Force 1-41 Infantry would be the spearhead of VII Corps. In addition, the corps had the 2nd Cavalry Regiment (United States) to act as a scouting and screening force, and two further heavy divisions, the 1st Cavalry Division (United States) and the United Kingdom's 1st Armoured Division, as well as the U.S. 11th Aviation Group. VII Corps fought a number of large battles against Iraqi forces, with some of historic scope and size. Three of the battles at Norfolk, Medina Ridge, and 73 Easting are considered among the largest tank battles in history. By the end of combat operations on 28 February 1991, U.S. VII Corps had driven 260 kilometres (160 mi), captured 22,000 Iraqi soldiers, and destroyed 1,350 Iraqi tanks, 1,224 armored personnel carriers, 285 artillery pieces, 105 air defense systems, and 1,229 trucks.

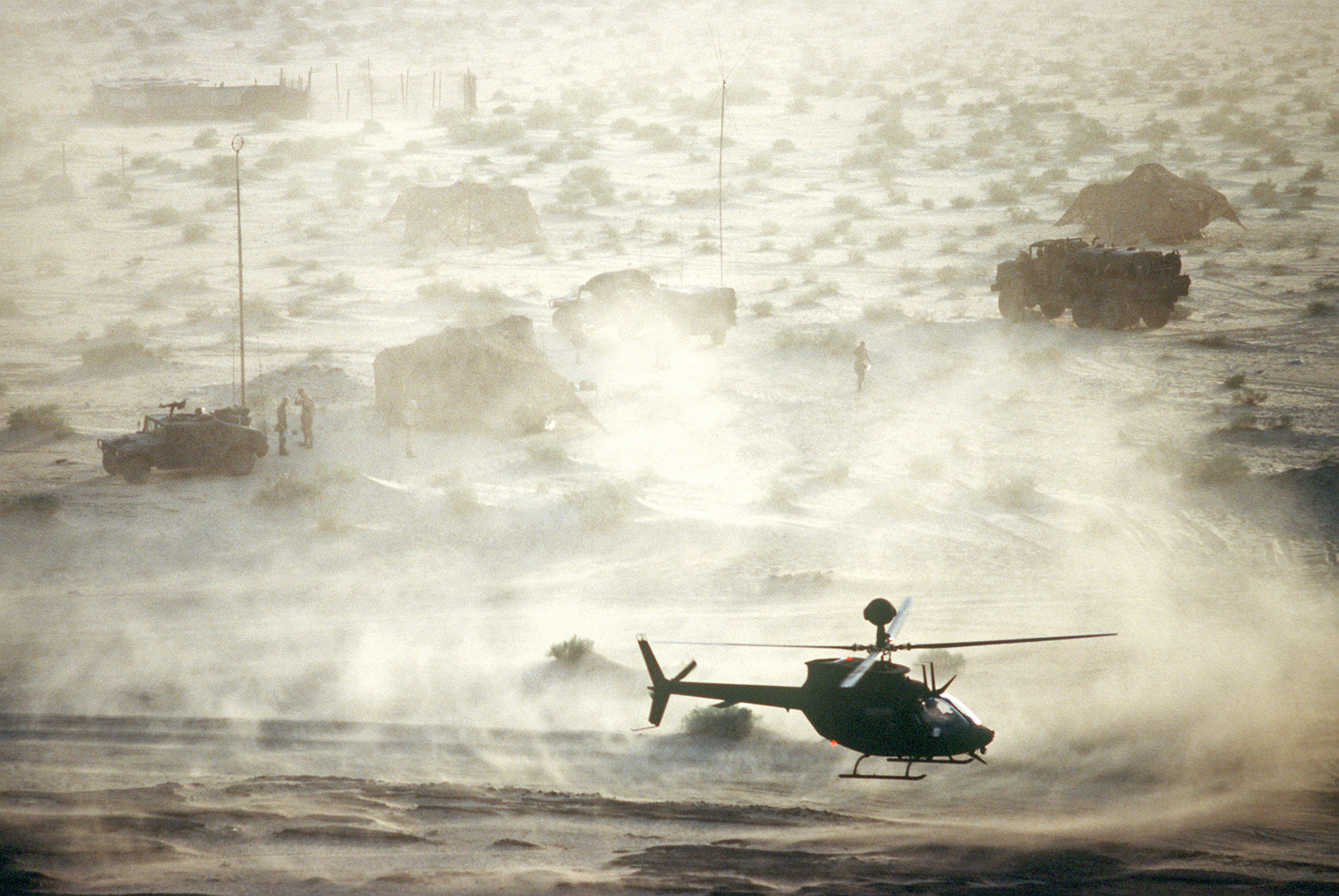
An OH-58D Kiowa helicopter departs from a communications site in the desert during Operation Desert Shield

The primary combat vehicles of the American divisions were the M1A1 Abrams tank and the Bradley Fighting Vehicle. The primary American artillery system was the self propelled M109 howitzer. The primary American attack helicopter was the Boeing AH-64 Apache (Army) with the Bell AH-1 Cobra (Army and Marines) also being in theatre. The U.S. Fairchild Republic A-10 Thunderbolt II ground attack aircraft would distinguish itself during the Gulf War aided by the OH-58D JAATT eyes in the sky. Together they inflicted significant damage on Iraqi ground forces. U.S. A-10 "Warthog" crews would destroy 900 Iraqi tanks, 2,000 other military vehicles and 1,200 artillery pieces during combat operations.

The U.S. Marine Corps was represented by the 1st Marine Division and the 2nd Marine Division. They were supported by the U.S. Army's 2nd Armored Division's Tiger Brigade to provide the Marines with additional armor support. Marine armor units mostly consisted of the older M-60 tank. The 1st Marine Division destroyed around 60 Iraqi tanks near the Burgan oil field without suffering any losses. The 1st Marine Division Task Force Ripper led the drive to the Kuwait International Airport on 27 February 1991. Marine Task Force Ripper destroyed about 100 Iraqi tanks and armored personnel carriers, including T-72 tanks. The division commander Maj. Gen. J.M. Myatt said, "During the first day of combat operations 1st Platoon, D Company, 3rd Tank Battalion destroyed 15 Iraqi tanks". The Marines also destroyed 25 APCs and took 300 prisoners of war. The U.S.M.C. would often encounter the Iraqi 3rd Armored Division in their theater of operations. Once the 1st Marine Division reached Kuwait International Airport they found what remained of the Iraqi 12th Armored Brigade, 3rd Armored Division defending it. The Marines destroyed 30 to 40 Iraqi T-72 tanks which had taken up defensive positions around the airport. The Iraqi 3rd Armored Division losses included more than 250 T-55/62s and 70 T-72 tanks by the end of combat operations. The Iraqi 3rd Armored Division would be totally destroyed. The 2nd Marine Division played a major role repelling the attempted Iraqi invasion of Saudi Arabia which is known as the Battle of Khafji. The 2nd Marine Division also faced heavy resistance during the Battle of Kuwait International Airport. The battle featured the "Reveille Engagement" which went on to become the largest tank battle in United States Marine Corps' entire history. Marine Reserve unit Bravo Company, 4th Tank Battalion, 4th Marine division was assigned to the 2nd Marine Division. Bravo Company destroyed a total of 119 enemy vehicles and took over 800 POWs by the end of combat operations. The 1st Tank Battalion claimed 50 Iraqi T-55 and T-62 tanks and 25 APCs. The 3rd Battalion claimed 57 T-55s and T-62s along with 5 T-72s, 7 APCs, and 10 trucks. The 8th Battalion destroyed more than three dozen tanks and a number of other vehicles. U.S. Marine Corps armor units would destroy hundreds of Iraqi tanks by the end of combat operations. U.S. Marine Corps tank losses would be light as they suffered the loss of ten M-60 tanks during combat operations.

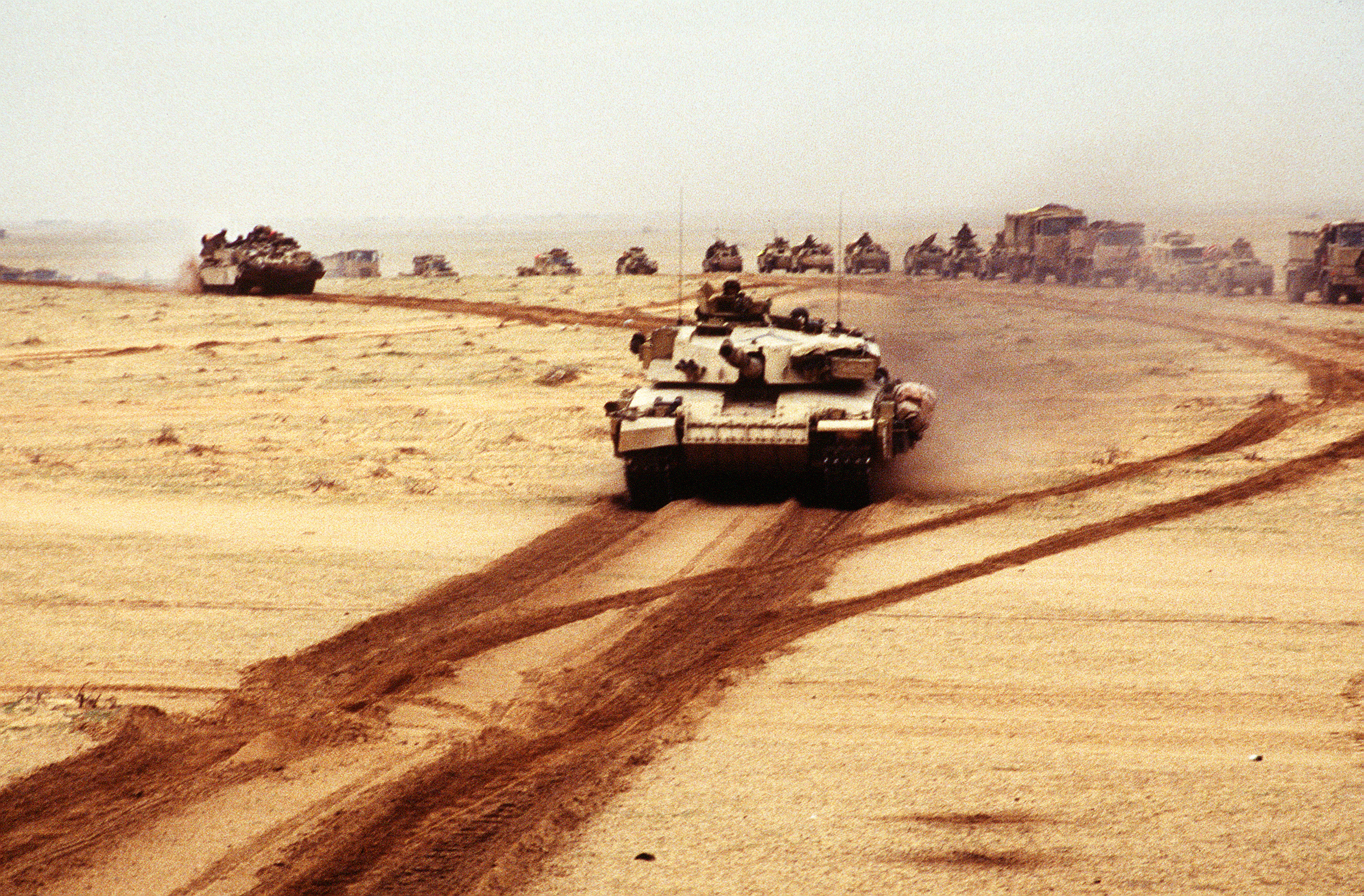
British Challenger 1 tanks during the Gulf War. The British Challenger tank was the most efficient tank of the Gulf War, suffering no losses while destroying approximately 300 Iraqi tanks during combat operations.

The United Kingdom was represented by its 1st Armoured Division known as the Desert Rats. The British 1st Armoured Division fielded approximately 176 Challenger 1 tanks. British infantry rode into battle on the Warrior tracked armoured vehicle. It had reasonable armour protection and a 30mm gun. Modified versions of the vehicle included mortar carriers, MILAN antitank systems, and command and control vehicles; and the British possessed a variety of excellent light armoured vehicles built on their FV101 Scorpion chassis. British artillery was primarily American made M109 howitzers (155mm), M110 howitzers (203mm), and M270 MLRS which were compatible with American systems. Their air support consisted of Gazelle helicopters, used for reconnaissance, and the Lynx helicopter which was comparable to the American AH-1 Cobra. The British had their full contingent of engineer, logistics, and medical units.

The British 1st Armoured Division was responsible for protecting the right flank of VII Corps. It was assumed by the Corps' planners the Iraqi 52nd Armored Division would counterattack VII Corps once their penetration into Iraqi defenses was discovered. The British 1st Armoured Division had two brigades (the 4th and 7th) which participated in Operation Granby, the name given to the British military operations during the 1991 Gulf War. The British 1st Armoured Division had traveled 217 miles in 97 hours. The British 1st Armoured Division had captured or destroyed about 300 Iraqi tanks and a very large number of armored personnel carriers, trucks, reconnaissance vehicles, etc. The Desert Rats also destroyed multiple Iraqi artillery positions. The division also took over 7,000 Iraqi prisoners of war including two division commanders and two other general officers. The British 1st Armoured Division destroyed or isolated four Iraqi infantry divisions (the 26th, 48th, 31st, and 25th) and overran the Iraqi 52nd Armored Division in several sharp engagements. The Iraqi 80th Armored Brigade would also fall victim to the British 1st Armoured Division.

Iraq was represented mostly by its own VII Corps and its Jihad Corps. Its most notable participants were its elite Republican Guard Divisions Tawakalna, Medina, Hammurabi, and Adnan. The first three of these had a strength of over 660 tanks, 660 infantry fighting vehicles, and thousands of antitank weapons, self propelled artillery, and other combat systems. The Tawakalna Republican Guard Division was Iraq's most powerful division which included approximately 14,000 soldiers, 220 T-72 tanks, 284 infantry fighting vehicles, 126 artillery pieces, and 18 MLRS. The Iraqi 52nd Armored Division was also a primary participant. It was a powerful division consisting of 245 tanks and 195 armored fighting vehicles. The Iraqi 10th and 12th Armored Divisions were also present. The two divisions formed the foundation of the Jihad Corps. The Iraqi 10th Armored Division was considered the best regular division in the Iraqi Army. It had more modern equipment than the other regular Iraqi units. It was equipped with T-72 and T-62 tanks. The T-62 tank being its primary system. Overall the primary tank of the Iraqi forces was the T-55 tank. The Iraqis fielded them in great numbers. The Iraqis also had elements of two other independent armored brigades in theatre, those being the 50th and 29th Armored Brigades. Iraq would also field multiple Infantry Divisions.

The Iraqis suffered the loss of over 3,000 tanks and over 2,000 other combat vehicles during these battles against the American-led coalition. It is estimated that Iraqi forces suffered 20,000–50,000 troops killed during combat operations. It is also estimated that over 75,000 Iraqi soldiers were wounded. Between 80,000 and 175,000 Iraqi troops were taken prisoner. Iraqi forces inflicted very minimal damage on Coalition forces.

=== Liberation of Kuwait ===
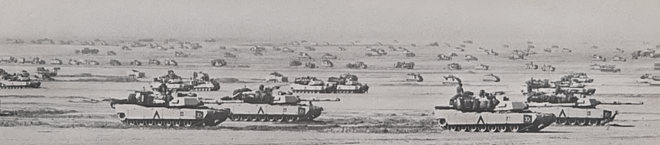
US M1A1 Abrams tanks from the 3rd Armored Division along the Line of Departure

US decoy attacks by air attacks and naval gunfire the night before Kuwait's liberation were designed to make the Iraqis believe the main coalition ground attack would focus on central Kuwait. For months, American units in Saudi Arabia had been under almost constant Iraqi artillery fire, as well as threats from Scud missiles and chemical attacks. On 24 February 1991, the 1st and 2nd Marine Divisions and the 1st Light Armored Infantry Battalion crossed into Kuwait and headed toward Kuwait City. They encountered trenches, barbed wire, and minefields. However, these positions were poorly defended, and were overrun in the first few hours. Several tank battles took place, but otherwise coalition troops encountered minimal resistance, as most Iraqi troops surrendered. The general pattern was that the Iraqis would put up a short fight before surrendering. However, Iraqi air defenses shot down nine US aircraft. Meanwhile, forces from Arab states advanced into Kuwait from the east, encountering little resistance and suffering few casualties.

Despite the successes of coalition forces, it was feared that the Iraqi Republican Guard would escape into Iraq before it could be destroyed. It was decided to send British armored forces into Kuwait 15 hours ahead of schedule, and to send US forces after the Republican Guard. The coalition advance was preceded by a heavy artillery and rocket barrage, after which 150,000 troops and 1,500 tanks began their advance. Iraqi forces in Kuwait counterattacked against US troops, acting on a direct order from Saddam Hussein himself. Despite the intense combat, the Americans repulsed the Iraqis and continued to advance towards Kuwait City.

Kuwaiti forces were tasked with liberating the city. Iraqi troops offered only light resistance. The Kuwaitis quickly liberated the city despite losing one soldier and having one plane shot down. On 27 February, Saddam ordered a retreat from Kuwait, and President Bush declared it liberated. However, an Iraqi unit at Kuwait International Airport appeared not to have received the message and fiercely resisted. US Marines fought for hours before securing the airport, after which Kuwait was declared secure. After four days of fighting, Iraqi forces were expelled from Kuwait. As part of a scorched earth policy, they set fire to nearly 700 oil wells and placed land mines around the wells to make extinguishing the fires more difficult.

=== Initial moves into Iraq ===
Ground troop movements 24–28 February 1991 during Operation Desert Storm

The war's ground phase was officially designated Operation Desert Saber. The first units to move into Iraq were three patrols of the British Special Air Service's B squadron, call signs Bravo One Zero, Bravo Two Zero, and Bravo Three Zero, in late January. These eight-man patrols landed behind Iraqi lines to gather intelligence on the movements of Scud mobile missile launchers, which could not be detected from the air, as they were hidden under bridges and camouflage netting during the day. Other objectives included the destruction of the launchers and their fiber-optic communications arrays that lay in pipelines and relayed coordinates to the TEL operators launching attacks against Israel. The operations were designed to prevent any possible Israeli intervention. Due to lack of sufficient ground cover to carry out their assignment, One Zero and Three Zero abandoned their operations, while Two Zero remained, and was later compromised, with only Sergeant Chris Ryan escaping to Syria.

Elements of the 2nd Brigade, 1st Battalion 5th Cavalry of the 1st Cavalry Division of the US Army performed a direct attack into Iraq on 15 February 1991, followed by one in force on 20 February that led directly through seven Iraqi divisions which were caught off guard. On 17 January 1991 the 101st Airborne Division Aviation Regiment fired the first shots of the war when eight AH-64 helicopters successfully destroyed two Iraqi early warning radar sites. From 15 to 20 February, the Battle of Wadi al-Batin took place inside Iraq; this was the first of two attacks by 1 Battalion 5th Cavalry of the 1st Cavalry Division. It was a feint attack, designed to make the Iraqis think that a coalition invasion would take place from the south. The Iraqis fiercely resisted, and the Americans eventually withdrew as planned back into the Wadi al-Batin. Three US soldiers were killed and nine wounded, with one M2 Bradley IFV turret destroyed, but they had taken 40 prisoners and destroyed five tanks, and successfully deceived the Iraqis. This attack led the way for the XVIII Airborne Corps to sweep around behind the 1st Cav and attack Iraqi forces to the west. On 22 February 1991, Iraq agreed to a Soviet-proposed ceasefire agreement. The agreement called for Iraq to withdraw troops to pre-invasion positions within six weeks following a total ceasefire, and called for monitoring of the ceasefire and withdrawal to be overseen by the UN Security Council.

The coalition rejected the proposal, but said that retreating Iraqi forces would not be attacked, and gave 24 hours for Iraq to withdraw its forces. On 23 February, fighting resulted in the capture of 500 Iraqi soldiers. On 24 February, British and American armored forces crossed the Iraq–Kuwait border and entered Iraq in large numbers, taking hundreds of prisoners. Iraqi resistance was light, and four Americans were killed.

=== Coalition forces enter Iraq ===
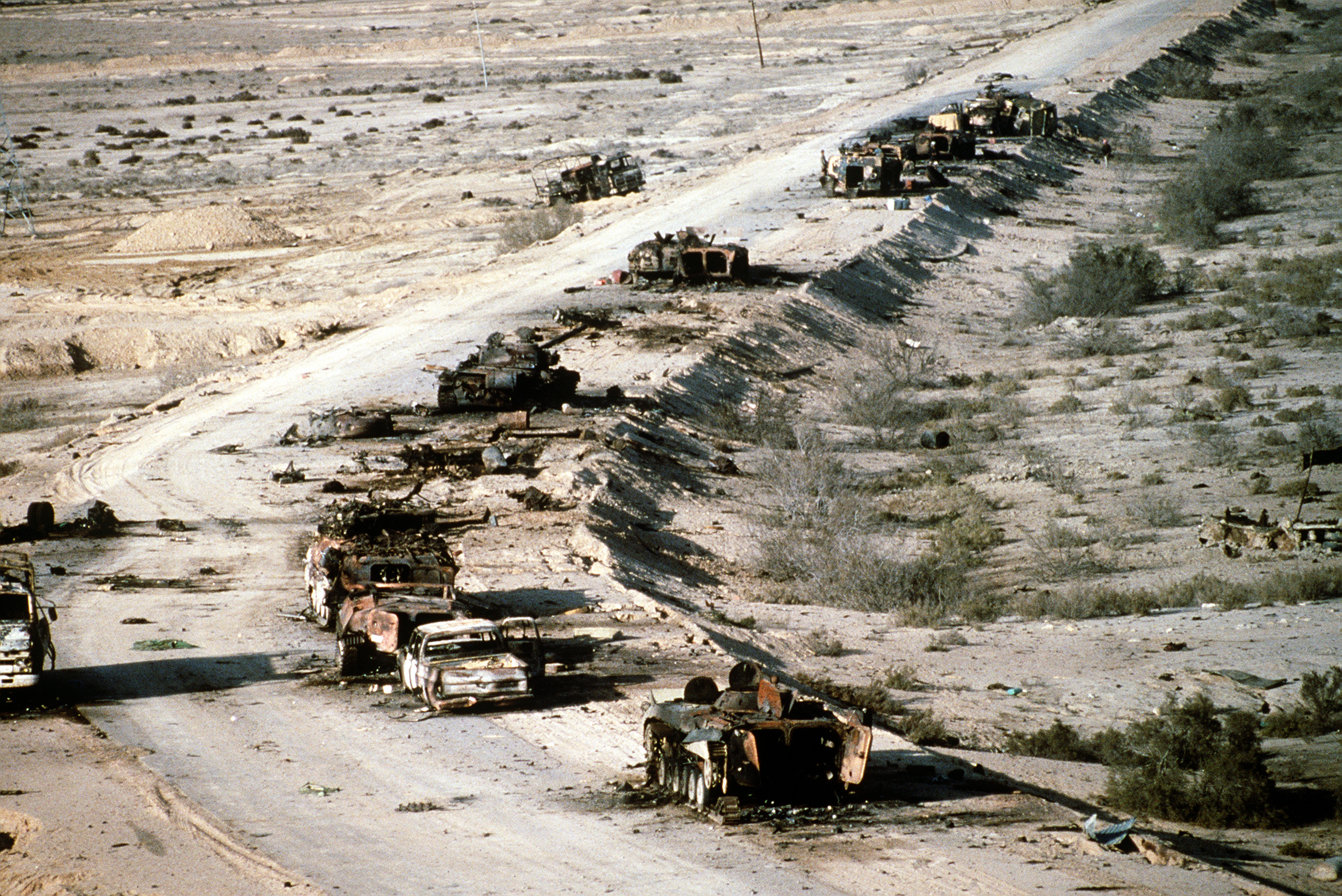
Aerial view of destroyed Iraqi T-72 tank, BMP-1 and Type 63 armored personnel carriers and trucks on Highway 8 in March 1991

Shortly afterwards, the US VII Corps, in full strength and spearheaded by the 2nd Armored Cavalry Regiment, launched an armored attack into Iraq early on 24 February, just to the west of Kuwait, surprising Iraqi forces. Simultaneously, the US XVIII Airborne Corps launched a sweeping "left-hook" attack across southern Iraq's largely undefended desert, led by the US 3rd Armored Cavalry Regiment and the 24th Infantry Division (Mechanized). This movement's left flank was protected by the French Division Daguet. The 101st Airborne Division conducted a combat air assault into enemy territory. The 101st Airborne Division had struck 249 km (155 mi) behind enemy lines. It was the deepest air assault operation in history. Approximately 400 helicopters transported 2,000 soldiers into Iraq where they destroyed Iraqi columns trying to flee westward and prevented the escape of Iraqi forces. The 101st Airborne Division travelled a further 80 to 100 km (50 to 60 mi) into Iraq. By nightfall, the 101st cut off Highway 8 which was a vital supply line running between Basra and the Iraqi forces. The 101st had lost 16 soldiers in action during the 100-hour war and captured thousands of enemy prisoners of war.

The French force quickly overcame Iraq's 45th Infantry Division, suffering light casualties and taking a large number of prisoners, and took up blocking positions to prevent an Iraqi counterattack on the coalition's flank. The movement's right flank was protected by the United Kingdom's 1st Armoured Division. Once the allies had penetrated deep into Iraqi territory, they turned eastward, launching a flank attack against the elite Republican Guard before it could escape. The Iraqis resisted fiercely from dug-in positions and stationary vehicles, and even mounted armored charges.

Unlike many previous engagements, the destruction of the first Iraqi tanks did not result in a mass surrender. The Iraqis suffered massive losses and lost dozens of tanks and vehicles, while US casualties were comparatively low, with a single Bradley knocked out. Coalition forces pressed another 10 km (6.2 mi) into Iraqi territory, and captured their objective within three hours. They took 500 prisoners and inflicted heavy losses, defeating Iraq's 26th Infantry Division. A US soldier was killed by an Iraqi land mine, another five by friendly fire, and 30 wounded during the battle. Meanwhile, British forces attacked Iraq's Medina Division and a major Republican Guard logistics base. In nearly two days of some of the war's most intense fighting, the British destroyed 40 enemy tanks and captured a division commander.

Meanwhile, US forces attacked the village of Al Busayyah, meeting fierce resistance. The US force destroyed military hardware and took prisoners, while suffering no casualties.

On 25 February 1991, Iraqi forces fired a Scud missile at an American barracks in Dhahran, Saudi Arabia. The missile attack killed 28 US military personnel.

The coalition's advance was much swifter than US generals had expected. On 26 February, after setting 737 of Kuwait's oil wells on fire, Iraqi troops began retreating. A long convoy of retreating Iraqi troops formed along the main Iraq–Kuwait highway. This convoy was bombed so extensively by coalition air forces that it came to be known as the Highway of Death. Thousands of Iraqi troops were killed. American, British, and French forces continued to pursue retreating Iraqi forces over the border and back into Iraq, eventually moving to within 240 km (150 mi) of Baghdad, before withdrawing back to Iraq's border with Kuwait and Saudi Arabia.

== End of active hostilities ==
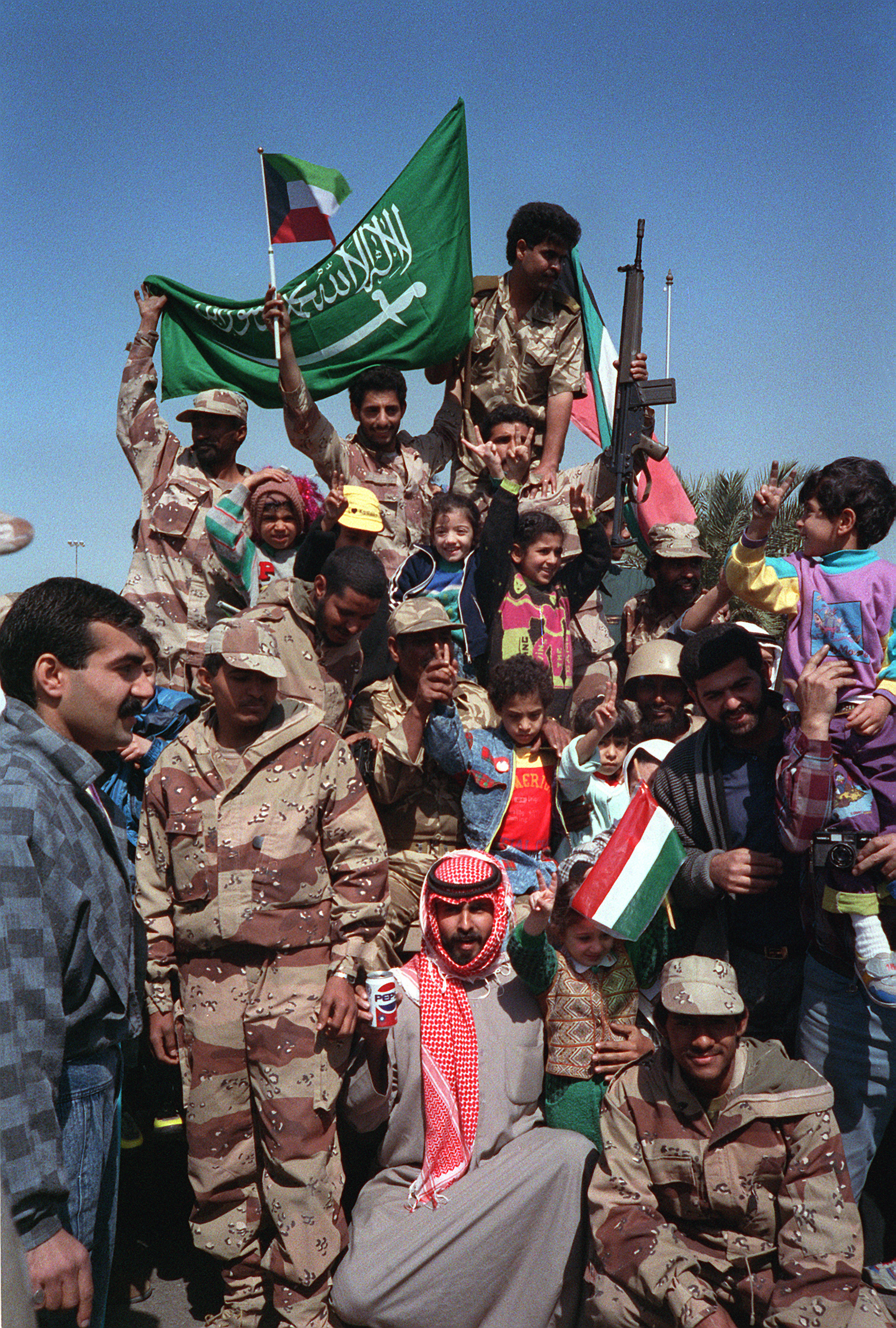
Civilians and coalition military forces wave Kuwaiti and Saudi Arabian flags as they celebrate the retreat of Iraqi forces from Kuwait.

In coalition-occupied Iraqi territory, a peace conference was held where a ceasefire agreement was negotiated and signed by both sides. At the conference, Iraq was authorized to fly armed helicopters on their side of the temporary border, ostensibly for government transit due to the damage done to civilian infrastructure. Soon after, these helicopters and much of Iraq's military were used to fight an uprising in the south. On March 1, 1991, one day after the Gulf War ceasefire, a revolt broke out in Basra against the Iraqi government.

The uprising spread within days to all of the largest Shia cities in southern Iraq: Najaf, Amarah, Diwaniya, Hilla, Karbala, Kut, Nasiriyah and Samawah. The rebellions were encouraged by an airing of "The Voice of Free Iraq" on 24 February 1991, which was broadcast from a CIA-run radio station out of Saudi Arabia. The Arabic service of the Voice of America supported the uprising by stating that the rebellion was well supported, and that they would soon be liberated from Saddam.

In the north, Kurdish leaders took American statements that they would support an uprising to heart, and began fighting, hoping to trigger a coup d'état. However, when no US support came, Iraqi generals remained loyal to Saddam and brutally crushed the Kurdish uprising and the uprising in the south. Millions of Kurds fled across the mountains to Turkey and Kurdish areas of Iran. On April 5, the Iraqi government announced "the complete crushing of acts of sedition, sabotage and rioting in all towns of Iraq." An estimated 25,000 to 100,000 Iraqis were killed in the uprisings.

In Kuwait, the Emir was restored, and suspected Iraqi collaborators were repressed. Eventually, over 400,000 people were expelled from the country, including a large number of Palestinians, because of PLO support of Saddam. Yasser Arafat did not apologize for his support of Iraq, but after his death Mahmoud Abbas formally apologized in 2004 on behalf of the PLO. This came after the Kuwaiti government formally forgave the group.

There was some criticism of the Bush administration, as they chose to allow Saddam to remain in power instead of pushing on to capture Baghdad and overthrowing his government. In their co-written 1998 book, A World Transformed, Bush and Brent Scowcroft argued that such a course would have fractured the alliance, and would have had many unnecessary political and human costs associated with it.

In 1992, the US defense secretary during the war, Dick Cheney, made the same point:

I would guess if we had gone in there, we would still have forces in Baghdad today. We'd be running the country. We would not have been able to get everybody out and bring everybody home.

And the final point that I think needs to be made is this question of casualties. I don't think you could have done all of that without significant additional US casualties, and while everybody was tremendously impressed with the low cost of the conflict, for the 146 Americans who were killed in action and for their families, it wasn't a cheap war.

And the question in my mind is, how many additional American casualties is Saddam [Hussein] worth? And the answer is, not that damned many. So, I think we got it right, both when we decided to expel him from Kuwait, but also when the President made the decision that we'd achieved our objectives and we were not going to go get bogged down in the problems of trying to take over and govern Iraq.

On 15 March 1991, Sheikh Jaber al-Ahmad al-Sabah returned to Kuwait, staying at the private home of a wealthy Kuwaiti as his own palace had been destroyed. He was met with a symbolic arrival with several dozen cars filled with people honking their horns and waving Kuwaiti flags who tried to follow the emir's convoy. According to The New York Times, he faced a population divided between those who stayed and those who fled, a government straining to reassert control and a rejuvenated opposition pressing for greater democracy and other postwar changes, including voting rights for women. Democracy advocates had been calling for restoration of Parliament that the emir had suspended in 1986.

== Coalition involvement ==
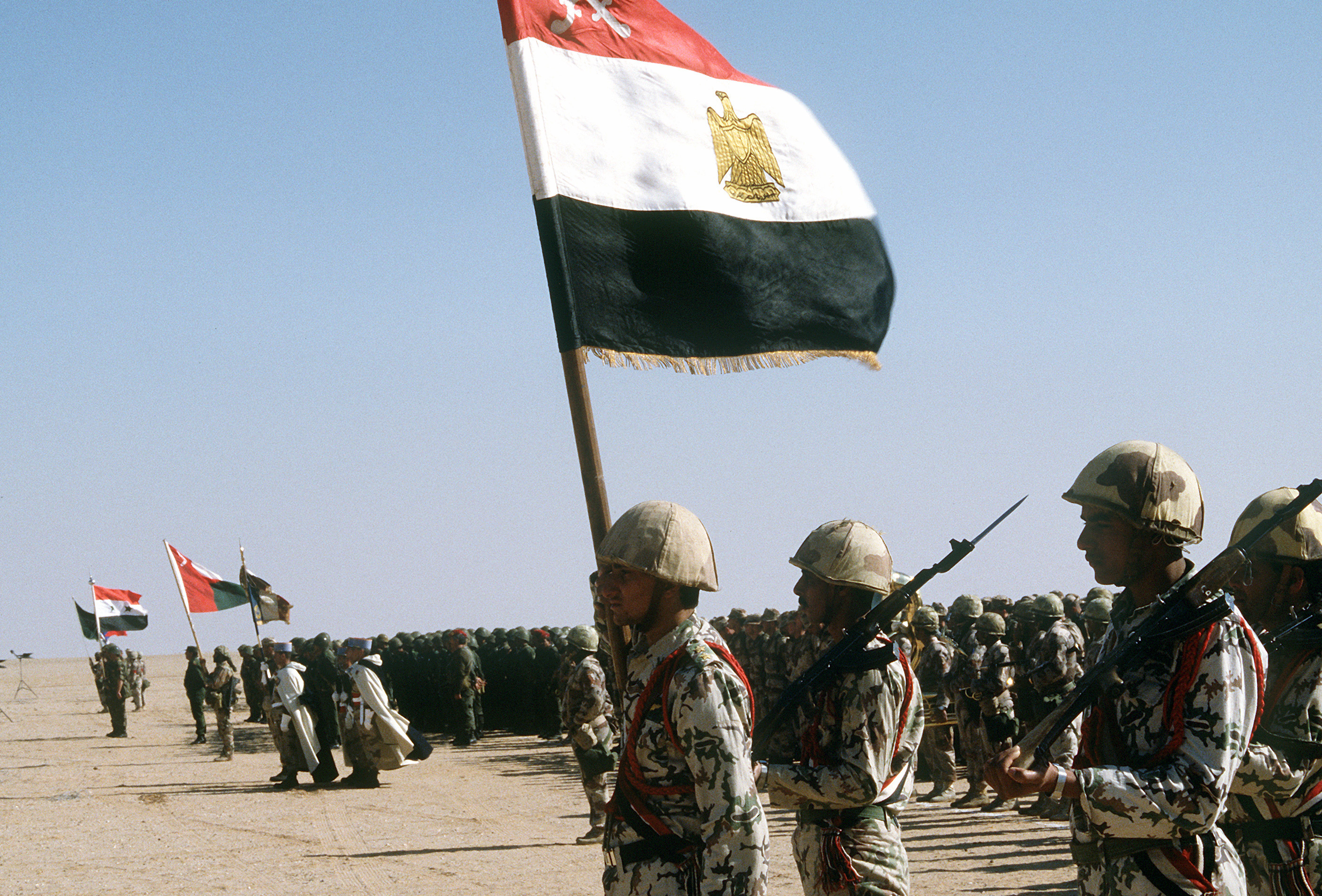
Coalition troops from Egypt, Syria, Oman, France, and Kuwait during Operation Desert Storm

Coalition members included Argentina, Australia, Bahrain, Bangladesh, Belgium, Canada, Czechoslovakia, Denmark, Egypt, France, Germany, Greece, Honduras, Hungary, Italy, Japan, Kuwait, Luxembourg, Morocco, the Netherlands, New Zealand, Niger, Norway, Oman, Pakistan, the Philippines, Poland, Portugal, Qatar, Romania, Saudi Arabia, Senegal, Sierra Leone, Singapore, South Korea, Spain, Sweden, Syria, Turkey, the United Arab Emirates, the United Kingdom and the United States. The United States had 700,000 troops.

Germany and Japan provided financial assistance and donated military hardware, although they did not send direct military assistance. This later became known as checkbook diplomacy.

=== Australia ===
Australia contributed a Naval Task Group, which formed part of the multi-national fleet in the Persian Gulf and Gulf of Oman, under Operation Damask. Medical teams were deployed aboard a US hospital ship, and a naval clearance diving team took part in de-mining Kuwait's port facilities following the end of combat operations. Australian forces experienced a number of incidents in the first number of weeks of the Desert Storm Campaign including the detection of significant air threats from Iraq as a part of the outer perimeter of Battle Force Zulu; the detection of free sea floating mines and assistance to the aircraft carrier USS Midway.

The Australian Task Force was also placed at great risk with regard to the sea mine threat, with HMAS Brisbane narrowly avoiding a mine. The Australians played a significant role in enforcing the sanctions put in place against Iraq following Kuwait's invasion. Following the war's end, Australia deployed a medical unit on Operation Habitat to northern Iraq as part of Operation Provide Comfort.

=== Argentina ===
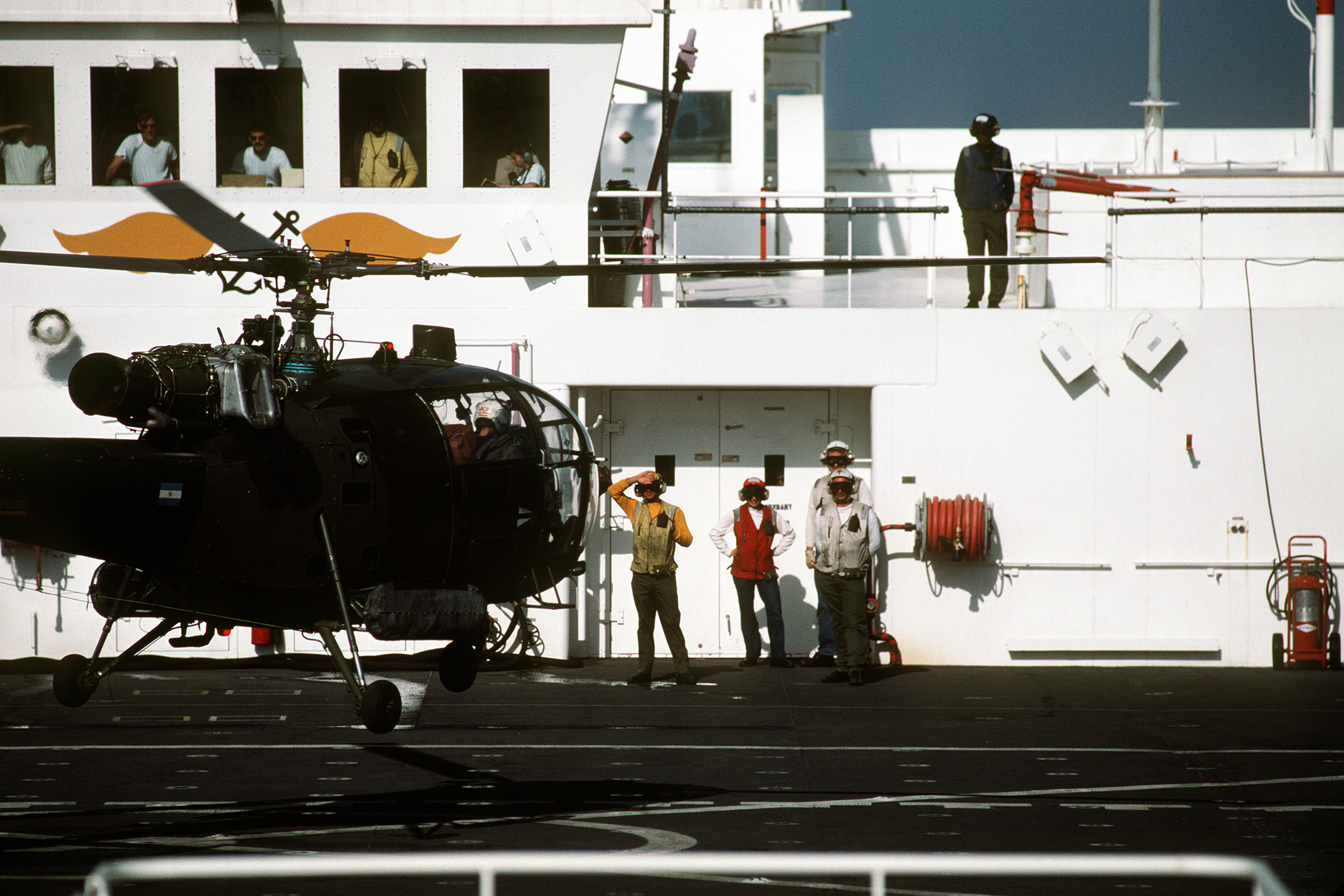
An Argentine Navy Alouette III helicopter on board USNS Comfort, February 1991

Argentina was the only South American country to participate in the 1991 Gulf War. It sent a destroyer, ARA Almirante Brown (D-10), a corvette, ARA Spiro (P-43) (later replaced by another corvette, ARA Rosales (P-42)) and a supply ship, ARA Bahía San Blas (B-4) to participate on the United Nations blockade and sea control effort of the Persian Gulf. The success of "Operación Alfil" (English: "Operation Bishop") with more than 700 interceptions and 25,000 nautical miles (46,000 km) sailed in the theatre of operations helped to overcome the so-called "Malvinas syndrome".

Argentina was later classified by the US as a major non-NATO ally due to its contributions during the war.

=== Canada ===
Canada was one of the first countries to condemn Iraq's invasion of Kuwait, and it quickly agreed to join the US-led coalition. In August 1990, Prime Minister Brian Mulroney committed the Canadian Forces to deploy a Naval Task Group. The destroyers HMCS Terra Nova and HMCS Athabaskan joined the maritime interdiction force supported by the supply ship HMCS Protecteur in Operation Friction. The Canadian Task Group led the coalition's maritime logistics forces in the Persian Gulf. A fourth ship, HMCS Huron, arrived in-theater after hostilities had ceased and was the first allied ship to visit Kuwait.

Following the UN-authorized use of force against Iraq, the Canadian Forces deployed a CF-18 Hornet and CH-124 Sea King squadron with support personnel, as well as a field hospital to deal with casualties from the ground war. When the air war began, the CF-18s were integrated into the coalition force and provided air cover and attacked ground targets. This was the first time since the Korean War that the Canadian Armed Forces had participated in an offensive. The only CF-18 Hornet to record an official victory during the conflict was an aircraft involved in the beginning of the Battle of Bubiyan against the Iraqi Navy.

=== France ===
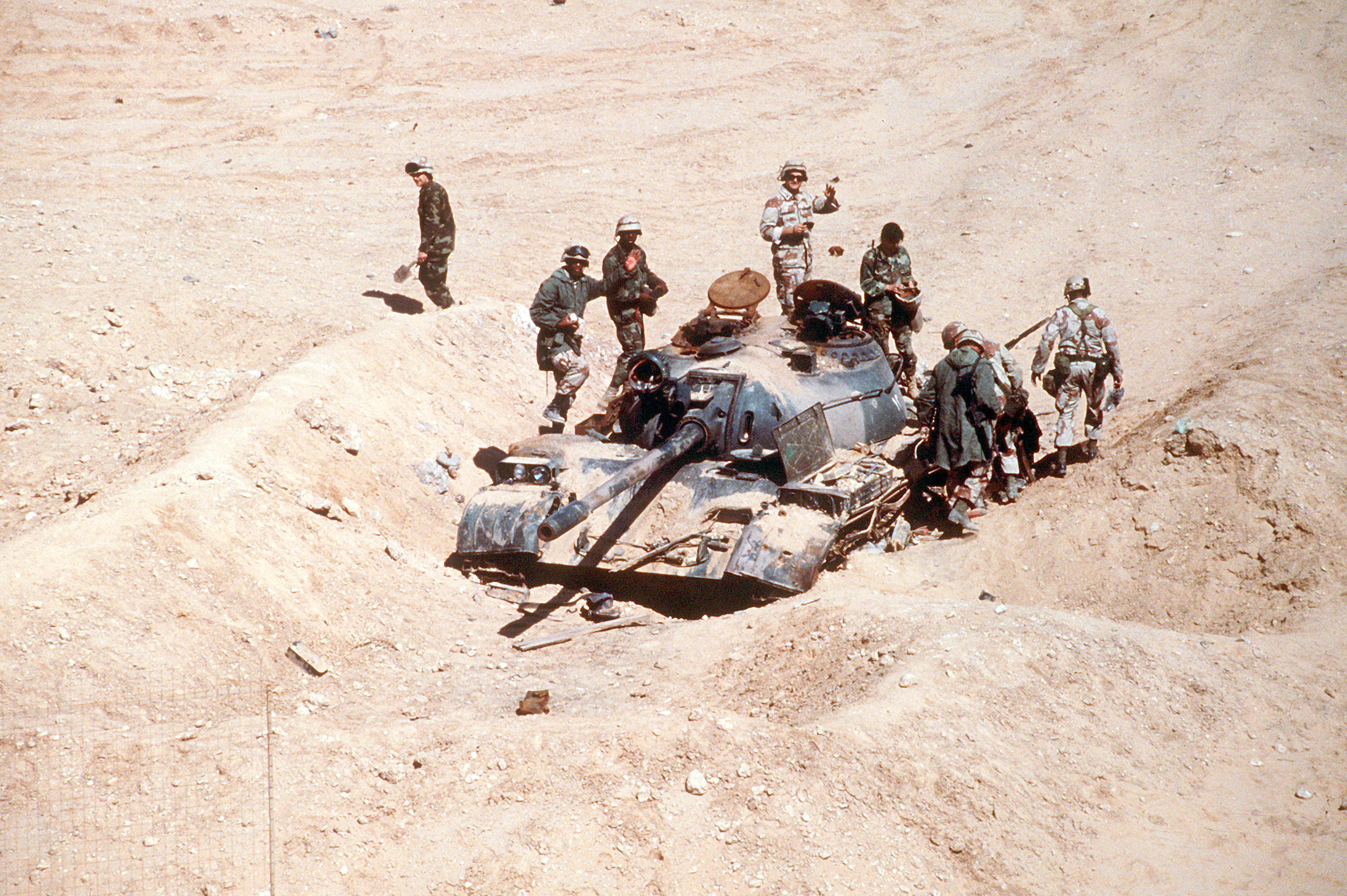
French and American soldiers inspecting an Iraqi Type 69 tank destroyed by the French Division Daguet during Operation Desert Storm

The second-largest European contingent was from France, which committed 18,000 troops. Operating on the left flank of the US XVIII Airborne Corps, the French Army force was the Division Daguet, including troops from the French Foreign Legion. Initially, the French operated independently under national command and control, but coordinated closely with the Americans (via CENTCOM) and Saudis. In January, the Division was placed under the tactical control of the XVIII Airborne Corps. France also deployed several combat aircraft and naval units. The French called their contribution Opération Daguet.

=== Italy ===
Following the invasion and annexation of Kuwait by Iraq, on September 25, 1990, the Italian Government sent eight Tornado IDS multirole fighter bombers (plus two spares) in the Persian Gulf, belonging to the 6º, 36º and 50º Stormo, which were deployed at the Al Dhafra Air Base, near Abu Dhabi, in the United Arab Emirates. During the 42 days of war, Italian fighters made 226 sorties for a total of 589 flight hours. The Italian Air Force lost one aircraft in the Gulf War. The use of Italian aircraft as part of the Desert Storm operation represented the first operational employment in combat missions of Italian Air Force aircraft since the end of World War II.

=== United Kingdom ===
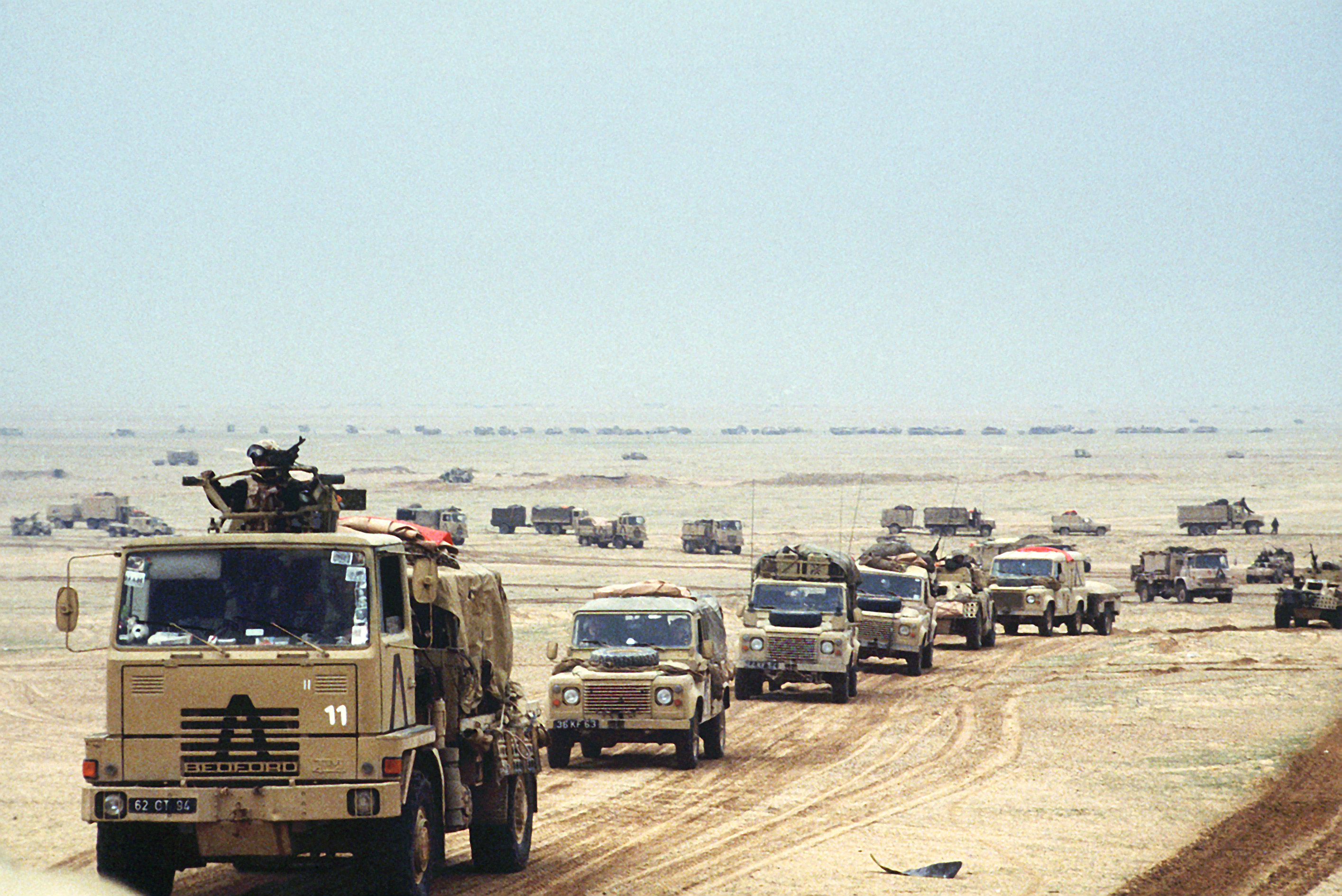
A British Army convoy during the Gulf War

The United Kingdom committed the largest contingent of any European state that participated in the war's combat operations. Operation Granby was the code name for the operations in the Persian Gulf. British Army regiments (mainly with the 1st Armoured Division), Royal Air Force, Naval Air Squadrons and Royal Navy vessels were mobilized in the Persian Gulf.

Both Royal Air Force and Naval Air Squadrons, using various aircraft, operated from airbases in Saudi Arabia and Naval Air Squadrons from vessels in the Persian Gulf. The United Kingdom played a major role in the Battle of Norfolk, where its forces destroyed over 200 Iraqi tanks and a large quantity of other vehicles. After 48 hours of combat the British 1st Armoured Division destroyed or isolated four Iraqi infantry divisions (the 26th, 48th, 31st, and 25th), and overran the Iraqi 52nd Armored Division in several sharp engagements.

Chief Royal Navy vessels deployed to the Persian Gulf included Broadsword-class frigates, and Sheffield-class destroyers. Other R.N. and RFA ships were also deployed. The light aircraft carrier HMS Ark Royal was deployed to the Mediterranean Sea.

Several SAS squadrons were deployed.

A British Challenger 1 achieved the longest range confirmed tank kill of the war, destroying an Iraqi tank with an armour-piercing fin-stabilized discarding-sabot (APFSDS) round fired over 4,700 metres (2.9 mi)—the longest tank-on-tank kill shot ever recorded.

== Casualties ==
=== Civilian ===
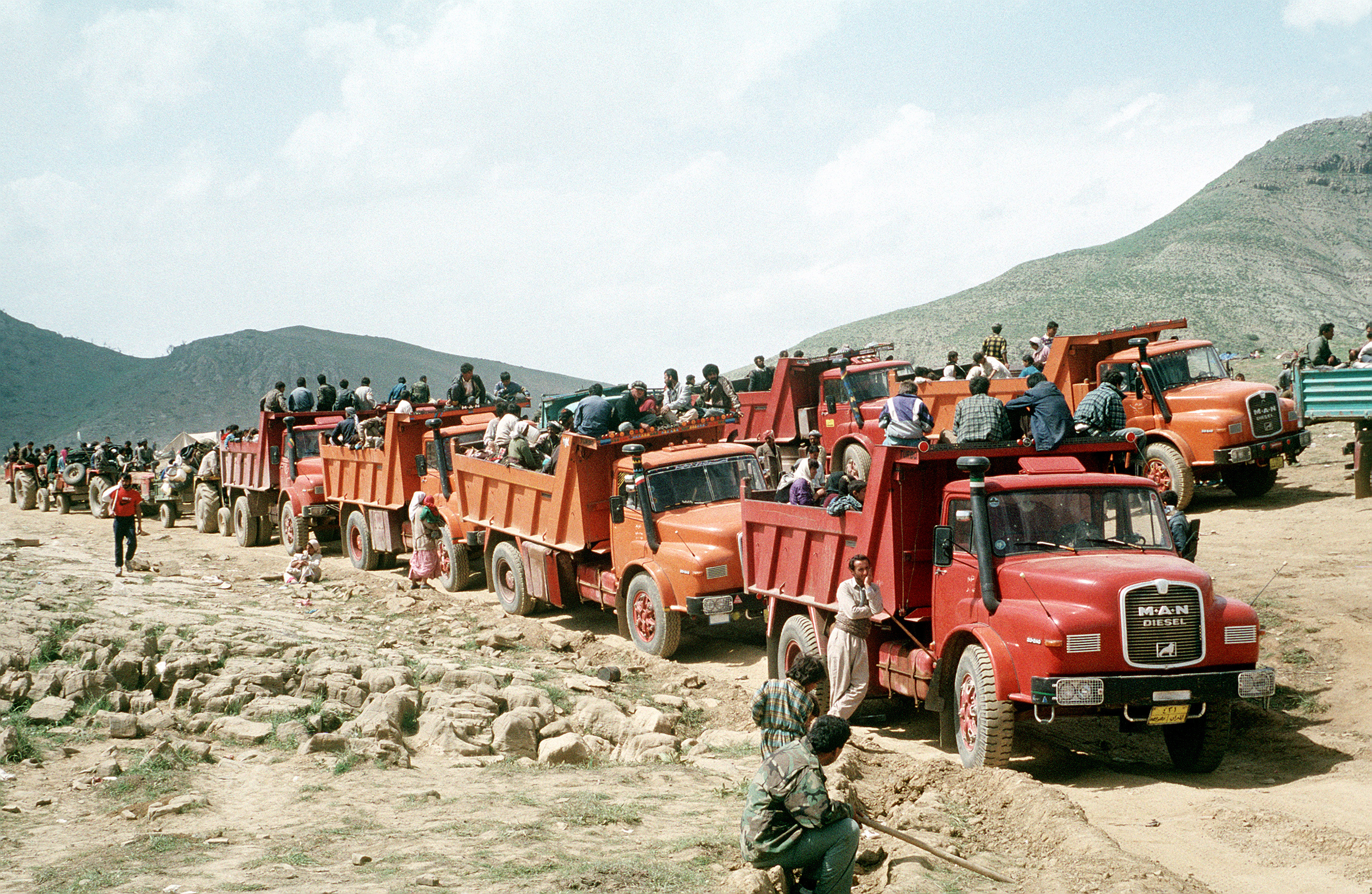
Iraqi Kurds fleeing to Turkey shortly after the war

Over 1,000 Kuwaiti civilians were killed by Iraqis. More than 600 Kuwaitis went missing during Iraq's occupation, and approximately 375 remains were found in mass graves in Iraq. The increased importance of air attacks from both coalition warplanes and cruise missiles led to controversy over the number of civilian deaths caused during Desert Storm's initial stages. Within Desert Storm's first 24 hours, more than 1,000 sorties were flown, many against targets in Baghdad.

In one noted incident, two USAF stealth planes bombed a bunker in Amiriyah, killing 408 Iraqi civilians. Scenes of burned and mutilated bodies were subsequently broadcast, and controversy arose over the bunker's status, with some stating that it was a civilian shelter, while others contended that it was a center of Iraqi military operations, and that the civilians had been deliberately moved there to act as human shields.

The Iraqi government claimed that 2,300 civilians died during the air campaign. A Project on Defense Alternatives study found that 3,664 Iraqi civilians were killed in the conflict.

During the nationwide uprisings against the Ba'athist Iraqi government that directly followed the end of the Gulf War in March and April, an estimated 25,000 to 100,000 Iraqis were killed, overwhelmingly civilians.

A Harvard University study released in June 1991 predicted that there would be tens of thousands of additional Iraqi civilian deaths by the end of 1991 due to the "public health catastrophe" caused by the destruction of the country's electrical generating capacity. "Without electricity, hospitals cannot function, perishable medicines spoil, water cannot be purified and raw sewage cannot be processed,". The US government refused to release its own study of the effects of the Iraqi public health crisis.

A 1992 investigation by Beth Osborne Daponte estimated about 13,000 civilians were directly killed in the war, while another 70,000 died indirectly from the war's other effects. According to a 1992 study published in The New England Journal of Medicine by researchers known as the International Study Team (IST), child mortality increased threefold as a result of the war, with 46,900 children under the age of 5 dying between January and August 1991.

These figures were challenged by a 2017 study published in The BMJ, which stated that the "IST survey probably understated the level of child mortality that prevailed during 1985–1990 and overstated the level during 1991." According to this study, "there was no major rise in child mortality in Iraq after 1990". A 2022 report Medact estimated the total number of Iraqi deaths caused directly and indirectly by the Gulf War to be between 142,500 and 206,000, including 100,000–120,000 military deaths, and 20,000–35,000 civilian deaths in the civil war and 15,000–30,000 refugee deaths after the end of the Gulf war.

Iraq also launched numerous attacks on civilian targets in Israel and Saudi Arabia. A 1991 report by Middle East Watch said that at least one Saudi civilian was killed after they were hit by Iraqi shelling in Riyadh. A disputed number of people were also killed during the Iraqi rocket attacks on Israel.

=== Iraqi ===
A United Nations report in March 1991 described the effect on Iraq of the US-led bombing campaign as "near apocalyptic", bringing back Iraq to the "pre-industrial age". The exact number of Iraqi combat casualties is unknown, but is believed to have been heavy. Some estimate that Iraq sustained between 20,000 and 35,000 fatalities. A report commissioned by the US Air Force estimated 10,000–12,000 Iraqi combat deaths in the air campaign, and as many as 10,000 casualties in the ground war.

According to the Project on Defense Alternatives study, between 20,000 and 26,000 Iraqi military personnel were killed in the conflict, while 75,000 others were wounded.

According to Kanan Makiya, "For the Iraqi people, the cost of enforcing the will of the United Nations has been grotesque." General Schwarzkopf talked about "a very, very large number of dead in these units, a very, very large number indeed." The chairman of the House Armed Services Committee, Les Aspin, estimated that "at least 65,000 Iraqi soldiers were killed". A figure was supported by Israeli sources who speak of "one to two hundred thousand Iraqi casualties." Most of the killing "took place during the ground war. Fleeing soldiers were bombed with a device known as a 'fuel-air explosive.'"

=== Coalition ===
Coalition troops killed by country
Country	Total	Enemy action	Accident	Friendly fire	Ref
United States	148	113	35	35	
Senegal	92		92		
United Kingdom	47	38	1	9	
Saudi Arabia	24	18	6		
Egypt	11		5		
France	9	2			
United Arab Emirates	6	6			
Qatar	3	3			
Syria	2				
Spain	2		2		
Kuwait	1	1			
Italy	1		1		
Czechoslovakia	1		1		

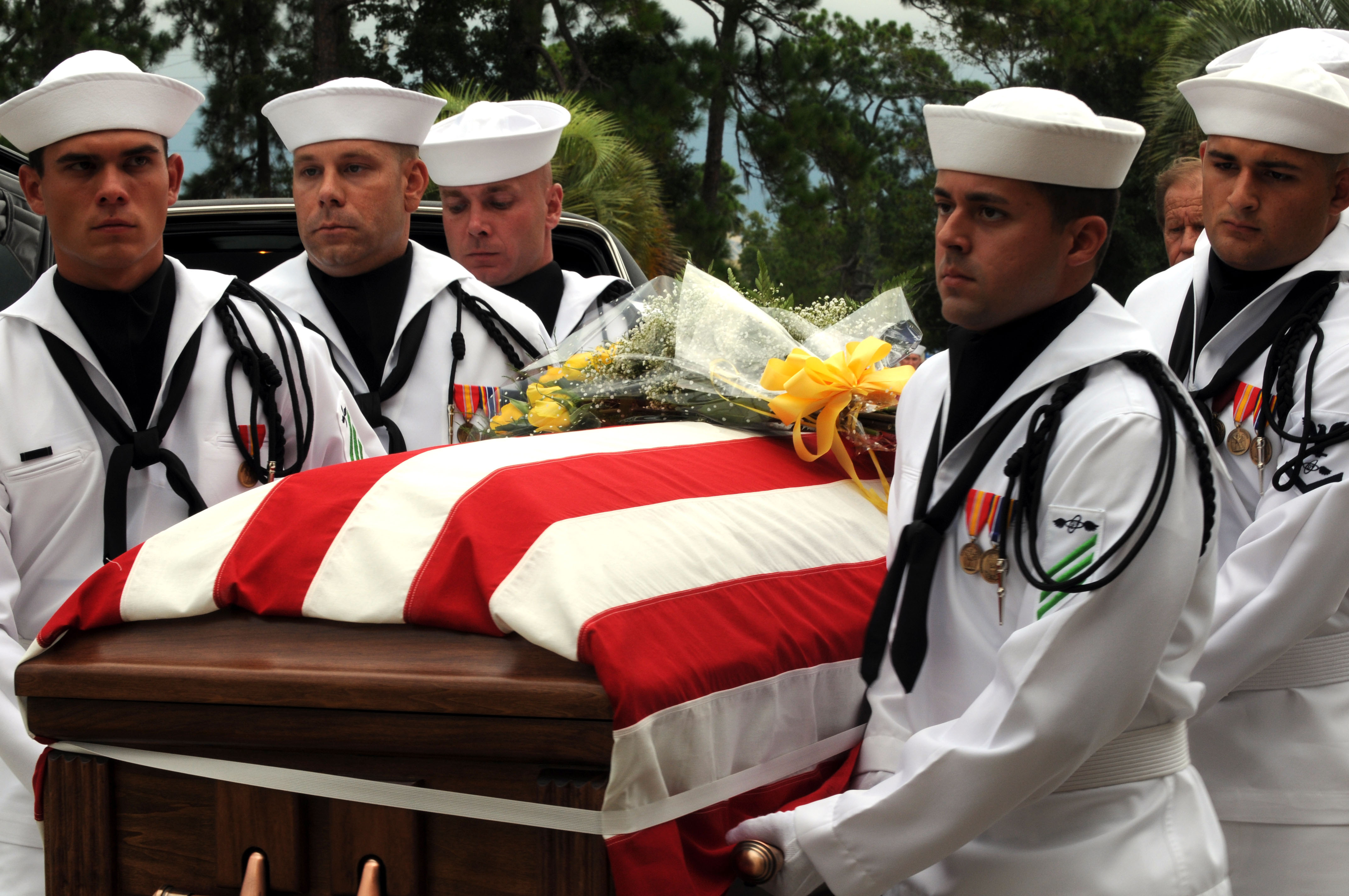
Sailors from a US Navy honor guard carry Navy pilot Scott Speicher's remains in 2009

The US Department of Defense reports that US forces suffered 148 battle-related deaths, 35 to friendly fire. One pilot was listed as MIA. His remains were found and identified in August 2009. A further 145 Americans died in non-combat accidents. The UK suffered 47 deaths (nine to friendly fire, all by US forces), France nine. The other coalition countries, not including Kuwait, suffered 37 deaths (18 Saudis, one Egyptian, six UAE and three Qataris). At least 605 Kuwaiti soldiers were still missing 10 years after their capture.

The largest single loss of life among coalition forces happened on 25 February 1991, when an Iraqi Al Hussein missile hit a US military barrack in Dhahran, Saudi Arabia, killing 28 US Army Reservists from Pennsylvania. In all, 190 coalition troops were killed by Iraqi fire during the war, 113 of whom were American, out of 358 coalition deaths. Another 44 soldiers were killed and 57 wounded by friendly fire. 145 soldiers died of exploding munitions or non-combat accidents.

The largest accident among coalition forces happened on 21 March 1991, when a Royal Saudi Air Force C-130H crashed in heavy smoke on approach to Ras Al-Mishab Airport, Saudi Arabia. 92 Senegalese soldiers and six Saudi crew members were killed.

The number of coalition wounded in combat was 776, including 458 Americans.

190 coalition troops were killed by Iraqi combatants, the rest of the 379 coalition deaths were from friendly fire or accidents. This number was much lower than expected. Among the American combat dead were four female soldiers.

==== Friendly fire ====
While the death toll among coalition forces engaging Iraqi combatants was very low, a substantial number of deaths were caused by accidental attacks from other Allied units. Of the 148 US troops who died in battle, 24% were killed by friendly fire, a total of 35 service personnel. A further 11 died in detonations of coalition munitions. Nine British military personnel were killed in a friendly fire incident when a USAF A-10 Thunderbolt II destroyed a group of two Warrior IFVs.

== Aftermath ==
=== Gulf War illness ===
Many returning coalition soldiers reported illnesses following their action in the war, a phenomenon known as Gulf War syndrome (GWS) or Gulf War illness (GWI). Common symptoms reported are chronic fatigue, fibromyalgia, and gastrointestinal disorder. There has been widespread speculation and disagreement about the causes of the illness and the possibly related birth defects. Researchers found that infants born to male veterans of the 1991 war had higher rates of two types of heart valve defects. Some children born after the war to Gulf War veterans had a certain kidney defect that was not found in Gulf War veterans' children born before the war. Researchers have said that they did not have enough information to link birth defects with exposure to toxic substances.

In 1994, the US Senate Committee on Banking, Housing, and Urban Affairs with Respect to Export Administration published a report entitled, "U.S. Chemical and Biological Warfare-Related Dual Use Exports to Iraq and their Possible Impact on the Health Consequences of the Gulf War". This publication, called the Riegle Report, summarized testimony this committee had received establishing that the U.S. had in the 1980s supplied Saddam Hussein with chemical and biological warfare technology, that Saddam had used such chemical weapons against Iran and his own native Kurds, and possibly against U.S. soldiers as well, plausibly contributing to the GWS.

A 2022 study by Robert W. Haley of the University of Texas Southwestern Medical Center, et al., of 1,016 U.S. Gulf War veterans found evidence of a causal link between GWS and exposure to low levels of the nerve agent sarin, which was released into the air by coalition bombing of Iraqi chemical weapons facilities. Significantly, the study found an increased incidence of GWS not only among veterans who recounted hearing nerve agent alarms, but also among veterans with the RR or QR (as opposed to the QQ) forms of the PON1 gene, which produces an enzyme that deactivates organophosphates (including sarin) through hydrolysis.

By contrast, GWS was inversely associated with higher levels of the type Q isozyme, which is more efficient at breaking down sarin than its type R counterpart. The authors "found that the PON1 genotype and hearing nerve agent alarms were independent and the findings robust to both measured and unmeasured confounding, supporting a mechanistic [gene–environment] interaction. ... Moreover, the change in the combined effect from one category to the next was significantly greater than the sum of the independent effects of the environmental exposure and the genotype".

=== Effects of depleted uranium ===
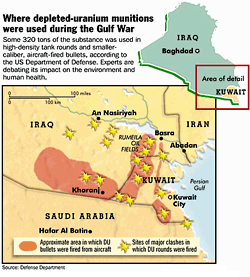
The approximate area and major clashes in which DU rounds were used

The US military used depleted uranium in tank kinetic energy penetrators and 20–30 mm (0.79–1.18 in) cannon ordnance. Significant controversy regarding the long term safety of depleted uranium exists, including claims of pyrophoric, genotoxic, and teratogenic heavy metal effects. Many have cited its use during the war as a contributing factor to a number of major health issues in veterans and in surrounding civilian populations, including in birth defects and child cancer rates. Scientific opinion on the risk is mixed. In 2004, Iraq had the highest mortality rate due to leukemia of any country.

Depleted uranium has 40% less radioactivity than natural uranium. Depleted uranium is not a significant health hazard unless it is taken into the body. External exposure to radiation from depleted uranium is generally not a major concern because the alpha particles emitted by its isotopes travel only a few centimeters in air or can be stopped by a sheet of paper. Also, the uranium-235 that remains in depleted uranium emits only a small amount of low-energy gamma radiation. However, if allowed to enter the body, depleted uranium, like natural uranium, has the potential for both chemical and radiological toxicity with the two important target organs being the kidneys and the lungs.

=== Highway of Death ===
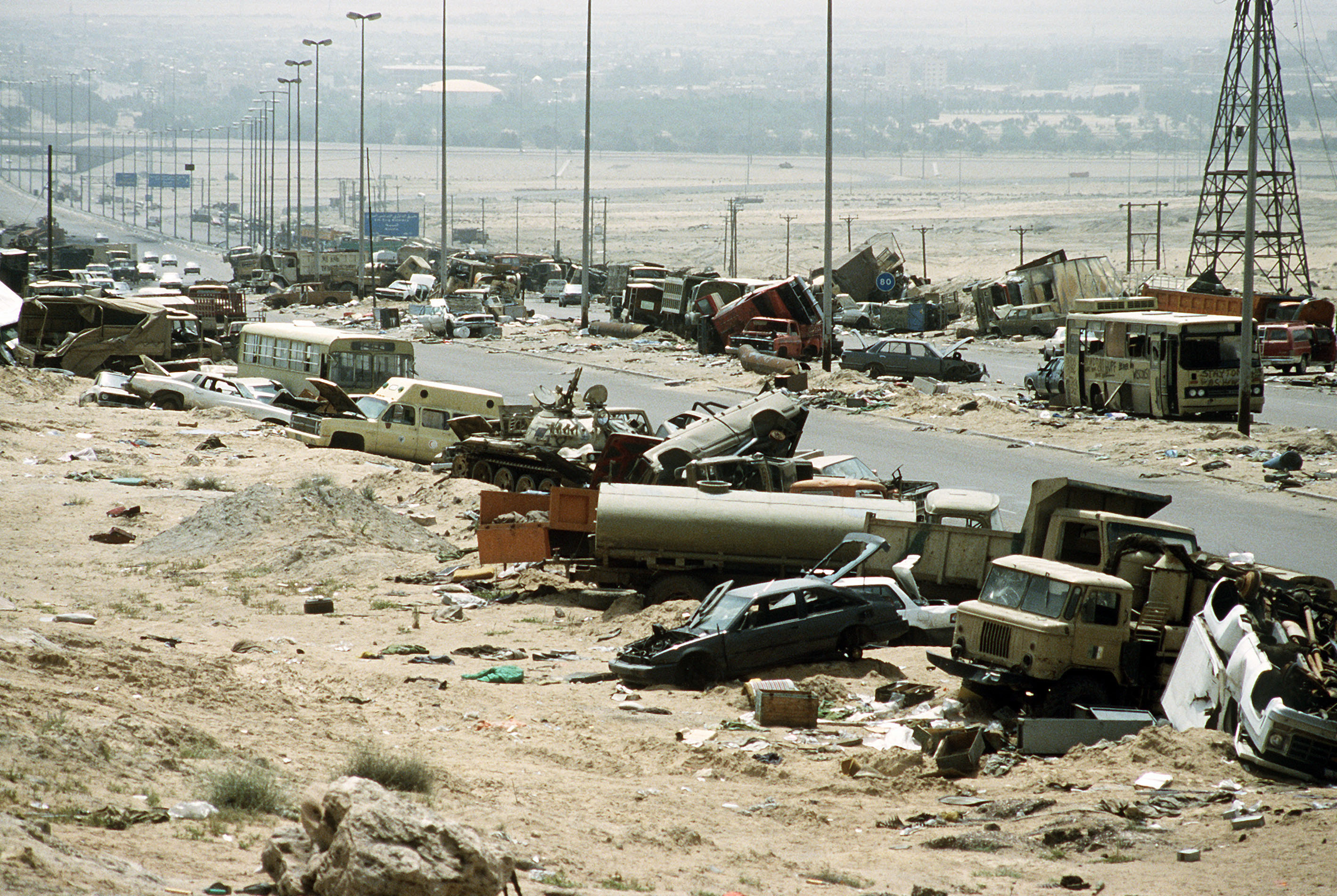
Destroyed Iraqi civilian and military vehicles on the Highway of Death

In the night of 26–27 February 1991, some Iraqi forces began leaving Kuwait on the main highway north of Al Jahra in a column of some 1,400 vehicles. A patrolling E-8 Joint STARS aircraft observed the retreating forces and relayed the information to the DDM-8 air operations center in Riyadh, Saudi Arabia. These vehicles and the retreating soldiers were subsequently attacked by two A-10 aircraft, resulting in a 60 kilometres (37 mi) stretch of highway strewn with debris—the Highway of Death. New York Times reporter Maureen Dowd wrote, "With the Iraqi leader facing military defeat, Mr. Bush decided that he would rather gamble on a violent and potentially unpopular ground war than risk the alternative: an imperfect settlement hammered out by the Soviets and Iraqis that world opinion might accept as tolerable."

Chuck Horner, Commander of US and allied air operations, has written:

[By February 26], the Iraqis totally lost heart and started to evacuate occupied Kuwait, but airpower halted the caravan of Iraqi Army and plunderers fleeing toward Basra. This event was later called by the media "The Highway of Death". There were certainly a lot of dead vehicles, but not so many dead Iraqis. They'd already learned to scamper off into the desert when our aircraft started to attack. Nevertheless, some people back home wrongly chose to believe we were cruelly and unusually punishing our already whipped foes.

...By February 27, talk had turned toward terminating the hostilities. Kuwait was free. We were not interested in governing Iraq. So the question became "How do we stop the killing."

=== Bulldozer assault ===
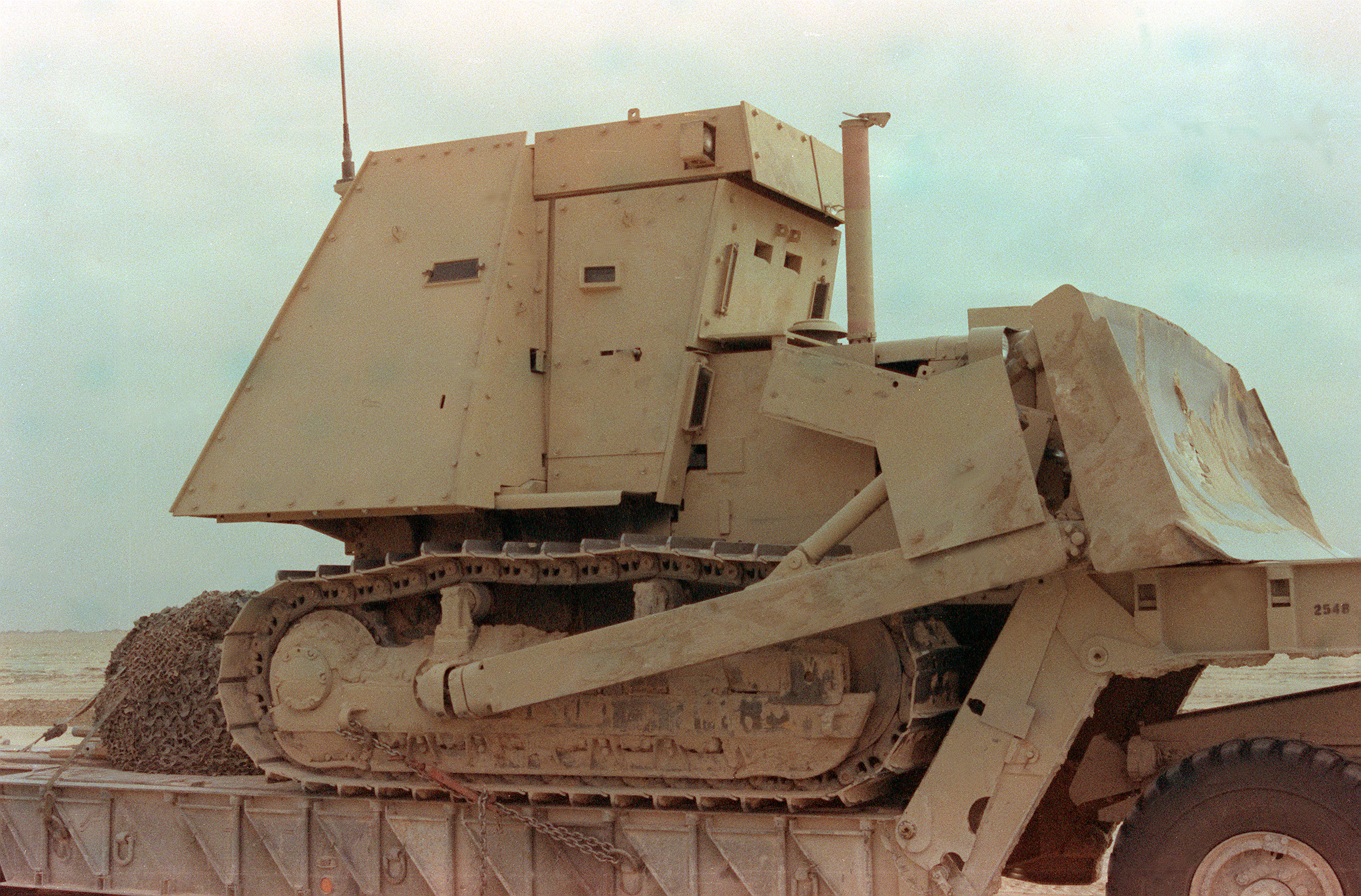
An armored bulldozer similar to the ones used in the attack

Another incident during the war highlighted the question of large-scale Iraqi combat deaths. This was the "bulldozer assault", where two brigades from the US 1st Infantry Division (Mechanized) were faced with a large and complex trench network, as part of the heavily fortified "Saddam Hussein Line". After some deliberation, they opted to use anti-mine plows mounted on tanks and combat earthmovers to simply plow over and bury alive the defending Iraqi soldiers. Not a single American was killed during the attack. Reporters were banned from witnessing the attack, near the neutral zone that touches the border between Saudi Arabia and Iraq. Every American in the assault was inside an armored vehicle.

Patrick Day Sloyan of Newsday reported, "Bradley Fighting Vehicles and Vulcan armored carriers straddled the trench lines and fired into the Iraqi soldiers as the tanks covered them with mounds of sand. 'I came through right after the lead company,' [Col. Anthony] Moreno said. 'What you saw was a bunch of buried trenches with peoples' arms and things sticking out of them.'" After the war, the Iraqi government said that only 44 bodies were found.

In his book The Wars Against Saddam, John Simpson alleges that US forces attempted to cover up the incident. After the incident, the commander of the 1st Brigade said: "I know burying people like that sounds pretty nasty, but it would be even nastier if we had to put our troops in the trenches and clean them out with bayonets." Secretary of Defense Dick Cheney did not mention the First Division's tactics in an interim report to Congress on Operation Desert Storm. In the report, Cheney acknowledged that 457 enemy soldiers were buried during the ground war.

=== Palestinian exodus from Kuwait ===
A Palestinian exodus from Kuwait took place during and after the Gulf War. During the Gulf War, more than 200,000 Palestinians fled Kuwait during the Iraqi occupation of Kuwait due to harassment and intimidation by Iraqi security forces, in addition to getting fired from work by Iraqi authority figures in Kuwait. After the Gulf War, the Kuwaiti authorities forcibly pressured nearly 200,000 Palestinians to leave Kuwait in 1991. Kuwait's policy, which led to this exodus, was a response to alignment of Palestinian leader Yasser Arafat and the PLO with Saddam Hussein.

The Palestinians who fled Kuwait were Jordanian citizens. In 2013, 280,000 Jordanian citizens of Palestinian origin lived in Kuwait. In 2012, 80,000 Palestinians (without Jordanian citizenship) lived in Kuwait.

Saudi Arabia expelled Yemeni workers after Yemen supported Saddam during the Gulf War.

=== Coalition bombing of Iraq's civilian infrastructure ===
In the 23 June 1991 edition of The Washington Post, reporter Bart Gellman wrote:

Many of the targets were chosen only secondarily to contribute to the military defeat of Iraq ... Military planners hoped the bombing would amplify the economic and psychological impact of international sanctions on Iraqi society ... They deliberately did great harm to Iraq's ability to support itself as an industrial society ...

In the Jan/Feb 1995 edition of Foreign Affairs, French diplomat Eric Rouleau wrote:

[T]he Iraqi people, who were not consulted about the invasion, have paid the price for their government's madness ... Iraqis understood the legitimacy of a military action to drive their army from Kuwait, but they have had difficulty comprehending the Allied rationale for using air power to systematically destroy or cripple Iraqi infrastructure and industry: electric power stations (92 percent of installed capacity destroyed), refineries (80 percent of production capacity), petrochemical complexes, telecommunications centers (including 135 telephone networks), bridges (more than 100), roads, highways, railroads, hundreds of locomotives and boxcars full of goods, radio and television broadcasting stations, cement plants, and factories producing aluminum, textiles, electric cables, and medical supplies.

However, the UN subsequently spent billions rebuilding hospitals, schools, and water purification facilities throughout the country.

=== Abuse of Coalition POWs ===
During the conflict, coalition aircrew shot down over Iraq were displayed as prisoners of war on TV, most with visible signs of abuse. Amongst several testimonies to poor treatment, USAF Captain Richard Storr was allegedly tortured by Iraqis during the Persian Gulf War. Iraqi secret police broke his nose, dislocated his shoulder and punctured his eardrum. Royal Air Force Tornado crew John Nichol and John Peters have both alleged that they were tortured during this time.

Nichol and Peters were forced to make statements against the war on television. Members of British Special Air Service Bravo Two Zero were captured while providing information about an Iraqi supply line of Scud missiles to coalition forces. Only one, Chris Ryan, evaded capture while the group's other surviving members were violently tortured. Flight surgeon (later General) Rhonda Cornum was sexually assaulted by one of her captors after the Black Hawk helicopter in which she was riding was shot down while searching for a downed F-16 pilot.

=== Operation Southern Watch ===
Since the war, the US has had a continued presence of 5,000 troops stationed in Saudi Arabia – a figure that rose to 10,000 during the 2003 conflict in Iraq. Operation Southern Watch enforced the no-fly zones over southern Iraq set up after 1991; oil exports through the Persian Gulf's shipping lanes were protected by the Bahrain-based US Fifth Fleet.

Since Saudi Arabia houses Mecca and Medina, Islam's holiest sites, many Muslims were upset at the permanent military presence. The continued presence of U.S. troops in Saudi Arabia after the war was one of the stated motivations behind the 11 September terrorist attacks, the Khobar Towers bombing, and the date chosen for the 1998 US embassy bombings (7 August), which was eight years to the day that US troops were sent to Saudi Arabia. Osama bin Laden interpreted the Islamic prophet Muhammad as banning the "permanent presence of infidels in Arabia". In 1996, bin Laden issued a fatwa, calling for US troops to leave Saudi Arabia. In a December 1999 interview with Rahimullah Yusufzai, bin Laden said he felt that Americans were "too near to Mecca" and considered this a provocation to the entire Islamic world.

=== Sanctions ===
On 6 August 1990, after Iraq's invasion of Kuwait, the UN Security Council adopted Resolution 661 which imposed economic sanctions on Iraq, providing for a full trade embargo, excluding medical supplies, food and other items of humanitarian necessity, these to be determined by the council's sanctions committee. From 1991 until 2003, the effects of government policy and sanctions regime led to hyperinflation, widespread poverty and malnutrition.

During the late 1990s, the UN considered relaxing the sanctions imposed because of the hardships suffered by ordinary Iraqis. Studies dispute the number of people who died in south and central Iraq during the years of the sanctions.

=== Draining of the Qurna Marshes ===
The draining of the Qurna Marshes was an irrigation project in Iraq during and immediately after the war, to drain a large area of marshes in the Tigris–Euphrates river system. Formerly covering an area of around 3,000 km^{2} (1,200 sq mi), the large complex of wetlands were nearly emptied of water, and the local Shi'ite population relocated, following the war and 1991 uprisings. By 2000, the United Nations Environment Programme estimated that 90% of the marshlands had disappeared, causing desertification of over 7,500 square miles (19,000 km^{2}).

The draining occurred in Iraq and to a smaller degree in Iran between the 1950s and 1990s to clear large areas of the marshes. Formerly covering an area of around 20,000 km^{2} (7,700 sq mi), the large complex of wetlands was 90% drained before the 2003 Invasion of Iraq. The marshes are typically divided into three main sub-marshes, the Hawizeh, Central, and Hammar Marshes and all three were drained at different times for different reasons. Initial draining of the Central Marshes was intended to reclaim land for agriculture but later all three marshes would become a tool of war and revenge.

Many international organizations such as the UN Human Rights Commission, the Islamic Supreme Council of Iraq, the Wetlands International, and Middle East Watch have described the project as a political attempt to force the Marsh Arabs out of the area through water diversion tactics.

=== Oil spill ===
On 23 January, Iraq dumped 400 million US gallons (1,500,000 m^{3}) of crude oil into the Persian Gulf, causing the largest offshore oil spill in history at that time. It was reported as a deliberate natural resources attack to keep US Marines from coming ashore (Missouri and Wisconsin had shelled Failaka Island during the war to reinforce the idea that there would be an amphibious assault attempt). About 30–40% of this came from allied raids on Iraqi coastal targets.

=== Kuwaiti oil fires ===
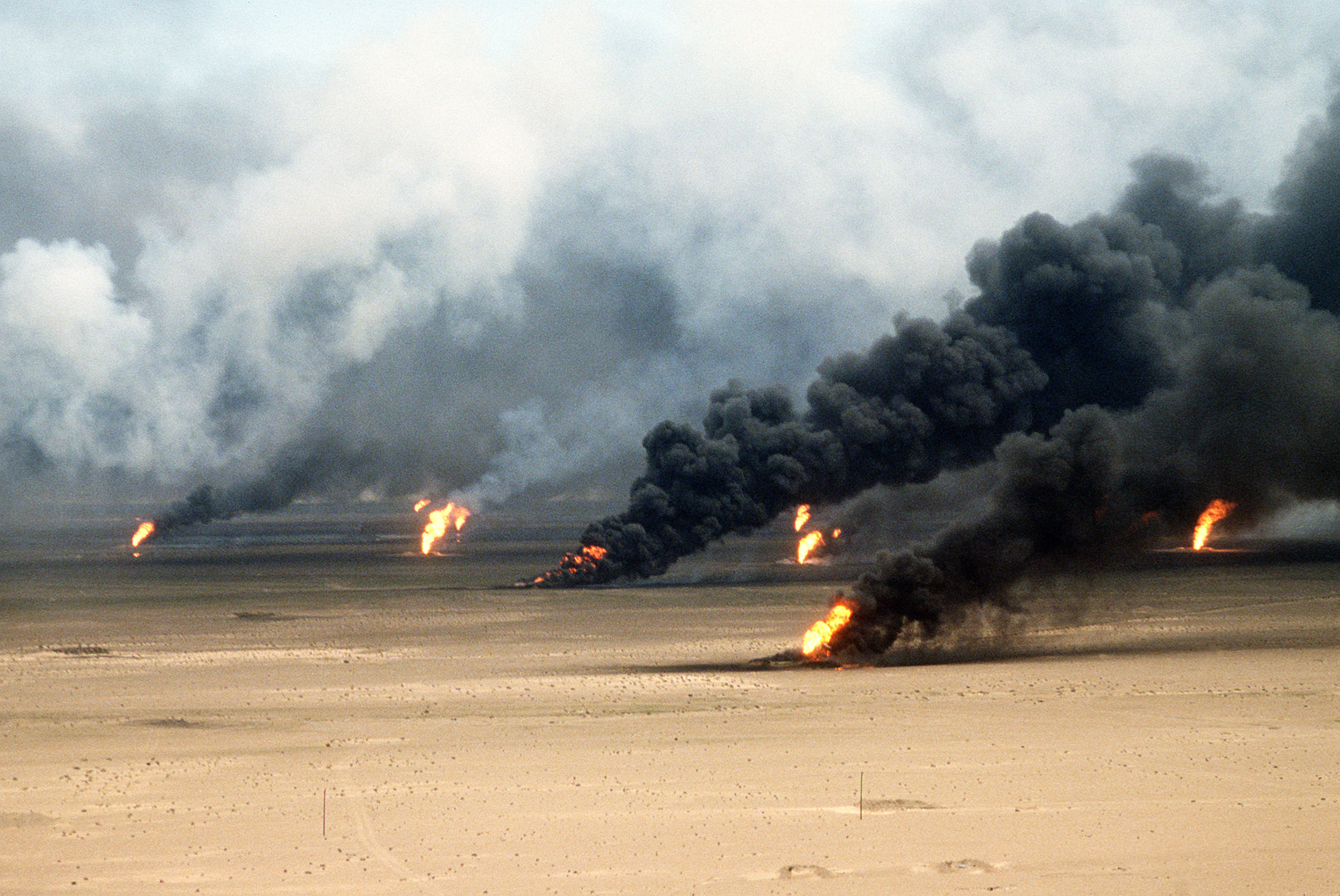
Oil well fires burn outside Kuwait City in 1991.

The Kuwaiti oil fires were caused by the Iraqi military setting fire to 700 oil wells as part of a scorched earth policy while retreating from Kuwait in 1991 after conquering the country but being driven out by coalition forces. The fires started in January and February 1991, and the last one was extinguished by November.

The resulting fires burned uncontrollably because of the dangers of sending in firefighting crews. Land mines had been placed in areas around the oil wells, and a military cleaning of the areas was necessary before the fires could be put out. Somewhere around 6 million barrels (950,000 m^{3}) of oil were lost each day. Eventually, privately contracted crews extinguished the fires, at a total cost of US$1.5 billion to Kuwait. By that time, however, the fires had burned for approximately 10 months, causing widespread pollution.

=== Iraqi uprisings ===
The 1991 Iraqi uprisings were ethnic and religious uprisings against Saddam Hussein's Ba'athist regime that were mainly led by Shia and Kurdish rebels. The uprisings lasted from March to April 1991 after a ceasefire following the end of the Gulf War. The mostly uncoordinated insurgency was fueled by the perception that Iraqi President Saddam Hussein had become vulnerable to regime change. This perception of weakness was largely the result of the outcome of the Iran–Iraq War and the Gulf War, both of which occurred within a single decade and devastated the population and economy of Iraq.

Within the first two weeks, most of Iraq's cities and provinces fell to rebel forces. Participants in the uprising were of diverse ethnic, religious and political affiliations, including military mutineers, Shia Islamists, Kurdish nationalists, Kurdish Islamists, and far-left groups. Following initial victories, the uprising was prevented from making further progress by internal divisions as well as a lack of anticipated American and Iranian support. Saddam's Sunni Arab-dominated Ba'ath Party regime managed to maintain control over the capital of Baghdad and soon largely suppressed the rebels in a brutal campaign conducted by loyalist forces spearheaded by the Iraqi Republican Guard.

Pursuing another Security Council resolution, the United States established the Iraqi no-fly zones and formed a Western coalition to aid Kurds who had fled to Turkey. The coalition ultimately pressured Saddam to withdraw from most of Iraqi Kurdistan (except Kirkuk), after which the autonomous Kurdistan Region was established. However, they fell into a civil war until a US-brokered ceasefire in September 1998. By contrast, Saddam viewed the Shia revolt in the south as "the most dangerous threat to his regime, and even to the continued existence of Iraq" as the Shia Arabs were the majority. The Iraqi government intensified a prior systematic forced relocation of Marsh Arabs and the draining of the Mesopotamian Marshes, and Saddam's suppression of the Shia revolt was considerably more brutal. The United States did not assist the Shia Arabs as it assisted the Kurds, leaving a legacy of mistrust among the Shia Arabs. Thousands of Iraqis detained during the suppression of the uprising remained unaccounted for. Iraqi government forces killed thousands of unarmed civilians through indiscriminate attacks, summary executions and helicopter attacks.

=== Weapons of mass destruction ===
United Nations Special Commission (UNSCOM) was an inspection regime created by the United Nations to ensure Iraq's compliance with policies concerning Iraqi production and use of weapons of mass destruction after the Gulf War. Between 1991 and 1997 its director was Rolf Ekéus; from 1997 to 1999 its director was Richard Butler.

== Cost ==
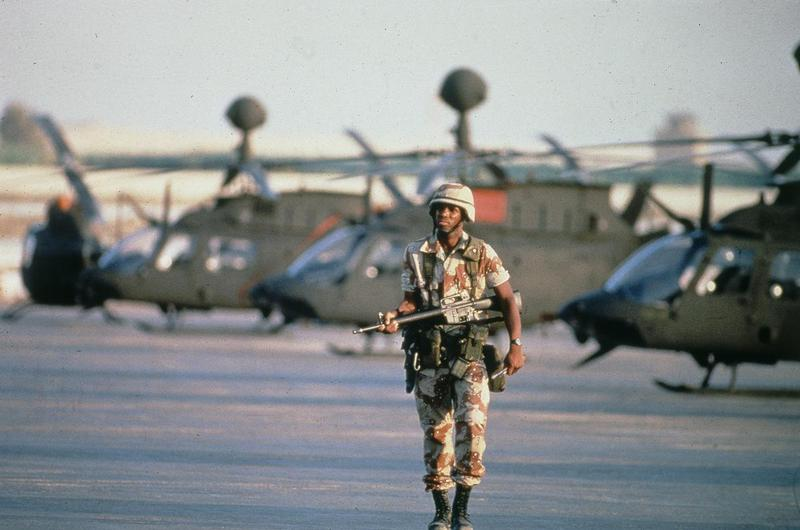
A sentry patrols along a line-up of OH-58 Kiowa helicopters

The cost of the war to the United States was calculated by the US Congress in April 1992 to be $61.1 billion (equivalent to $126 billion in 2025). About $52 billion of that amount was paid by other countries. $36 billion by Kuwait, Saudi Arabia and other Arab states of the Persian Gulf. $16 billion were contributed by Germany and Japan, which sent no combat forces due to their constitutions. About 25% of Saudi Arabia's contribution was paid with in-kind services to the troops, such as food and transportation. US troops represented about 74% of the combined force, and the global cost was therefore higher.

=== Effect on developing countries ===
Apart from the impact on Arab States of the Persian Gulf, the resulting economic disruptions after the crisis affected many states. The Overseas Development Institute (ODI) undertook a study in 1991 to assess the effects on developing states and the international community's response. A briefing paper finalized on the day that the conflict ended draws on their findings which had two main conclusions: Many developing states were severely affected and while there has been a considerable response to the crisis, the distribution of assistance was highly selective.

The ODI factored in elements of "cost" which included oil imports, remittance flows, re-settlement costs, loss of export earnings and tourism. For Egypt, the cost totaled $1 billion, 3% of GDP. Yemen had a cost of $830 million, 10% of GDP, while it cost Jordan $1.8 billion, 32% of GDP.

International response to the crisis on developing states came with the channeling of aid through The Gulf Crisis Financial Co-ordination Group. They were 24 states, comprising most of the OECD countries plus some Gulf states: Saudi Arabia, United Arab Emirates, Qatar and Kuwait. The members of this group agreed to disperse $14 billion in development assistance.

The World Bank responded by speeding up the disbursement of existing project and adjustment loans. The International Monetary Fund adopted two lending facilities – the Enhanced Structural Adjustment Facility (ESAF) and the Compensatory & Contingency Financing Facility (CCFF). The European Community offered $2 billion in assistance.

== Media coverage ==
US policy regarding media freedom was much more restrictive than in the Vietnam War. The policy had been spelled out in a Pentagon document entitled Annex Foxtrot. Most of the press information came from briefings organized by the military. Only selected journalists were allowed to visit the front lines or conduct interviews with soldiers. Those visits were always conducted in the presence of officers, and were subject to both prior approval by the military and censorship afterward. This was ostensibly to protect sensitive information from being revealed to Iraq.

This policy was heavily influenced by the military's experience with the Vietnam War, in which public opposition within the US grew throughout the war's course. It was not only the limitation of information in the Middle East; media were also restricting what was shown about the war with more graphic depictions like Ken Jarecke's image of a burnt Iraqi soldier being pulled from the American AP wire whereas in Europe it was given extensive coverage.

Two BBC journalists, John Simpson and Bob Simpson (no relation), defied their editors and remained in Baghdad to report on the war's progress. They were responsible for a report which included an "infamous cruise missile that travelled down a street and turned left at a traffic light."

Alternative media outlets provided views opposing the war. Deep Dish Television compiled segments from independent producers in the US and abroad, and produced a 10-hour series that was distributed internationally, called The Gulf Crisis TV Project. The series' first program War, Oil and Power was compiled and released in 1990, before the war broke out. News World Order was the title of another program in the series; it focused on the media's complicity in promoting the war, as well as Americans' reactions to the media coverage.

Media watchdog group Fairness and Accuracy in Reporting (FAIR) critically analyzed media coverage during the war in various articles and books, such as the 1991 Gulf War Coverage: The Worst Censorship was at Home.

== Technology and equipments ==
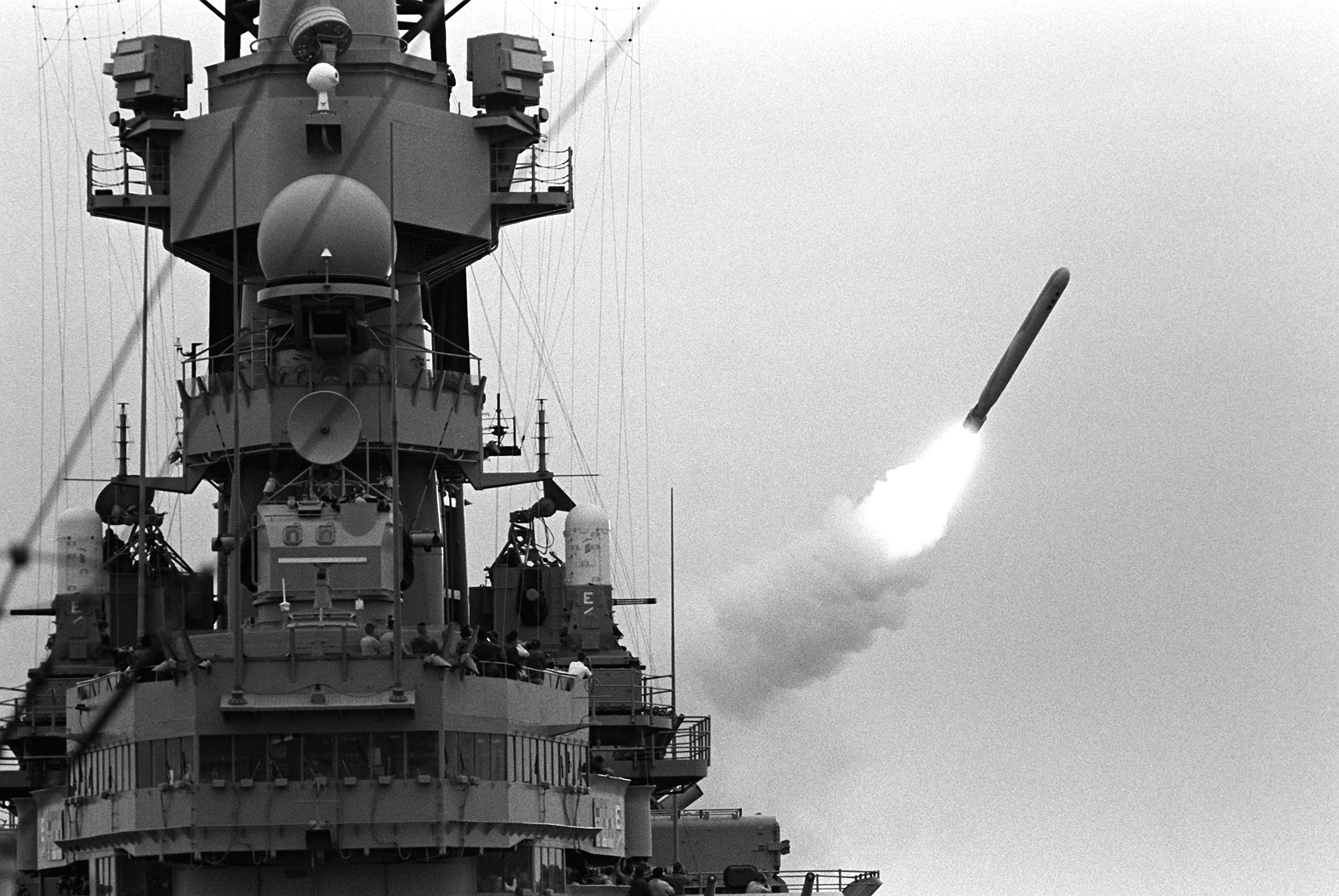
USS Missouri launching a Tomahawk missile. The Gulf War was the last conflict in which battleships were deployed in a combat role.

The Gulf War was notable for some of the first large-scale uses of precision-guided munitions, and stealth aircraft, via the Lockheed F-117 Nighthawk. Analysts refer to it as the "first space war" for the US usage of satellite-based reconnaissance, communications, and navigation.

Precision-guided munitions, informally "smart bombs", were heralded as key in allowing military strikes to be made with a minimum of civilian casualties compared to previous wars, although they were not used as often as more traditional, less accurate bombs. Specific buildings in downtown Baghdad could be bombed while journalists in their hotels watched cruise missiles fly by.

Precision-guided munitions amounted to approximately 7.4% of all bombs dropped by the coalition. Other bombs included cluster bombs, which disperse numerous submunitions, and daisy cutters, 15,000-pound bombs which can disintegrate everything within hundreds of yards.

Global Positioning System (GPS) units were relatively new at the time and were important in enabling coalition units to easily navigate across the desert. Since military GPS receivers were not available for most troops, many used commercially available units. To permit these to be used to best effect, the "selective availability" feature of the GPS system was turned off for the duration of Desert Storm, allowing these commercial receivers to provide the same precision as the military equipment.

Airborne Warning and Control System (AWACS) and satellite communication systems were also important. Two examples of this are the US Navy's Grumman E-2 Hawkeye and the US Air Force's Boeing E-3 Sentry. Both were used in command and control area of operations. These systems provided essential communications links between air, ground, and naval forces. It is one of several reasons coalition forces dominated the air war.

American-made color photocopiers were used to produce some of Iraq's battle plans. Some of the copiers contained concealed high-tech transmitters that revealed their positions to American electronic warfare aircraft, leading to more precise bombings.

=== Scud and Patriot missiles ===
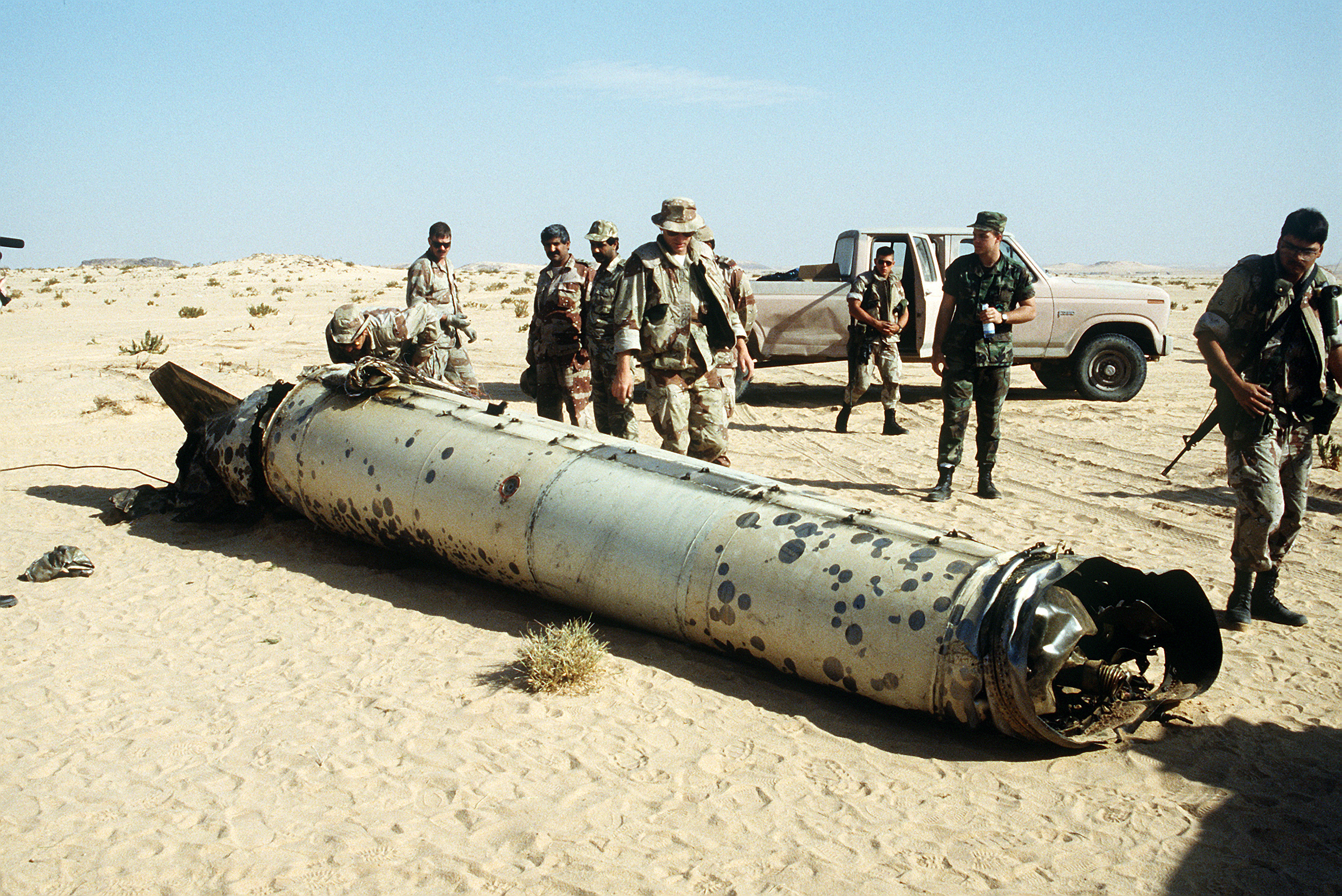
Military personnel examine the remains of a Scud.

The role of Iraq's Scud missiles featured prominently in the war. Scud is a tactical ballistic missile that the Soviet Union developed and deployed among the forward deployed Soviet Army divisions in East Germany.

Scud missiles utilize inertial guidance which operates for the duration that the engines operate. Iraq used Scud missiles, launching them into both Saudi Arabia and Israel. Some missiles caused extensive casualties, while others caused little damage.

The US Patriot missile was used in combat for the first time. The US military claimed a high effectiveness against Scuds at the time, but later analysis gives figures as low as 9%, with 45% of the 158 Patriot launches being against debris or false targets. The Dutch Ministry of Defense, which also sent Patriot missiles to protect civilians in Israel and Turkey, later disputed the higher claim. There is at least one incident of a software error causing a Patriot missile's failure to engage an incoming Scud, resulting in deaths. Both the US Army and the missile manufacturers maintained the Patriot delivered a "miracle performance" in the Gulf War.

== In popular culture ==
The Gulf War has been the subject of several video games including Conflict: Desert Storm, Conflict: Desert Storm II, Gulf War: Operation Desert Hammer, and Call of Duty: Black Ops 6, which was banned in Kuwait. Depictions in film include Jarhead (2005), which is based on US Marine Anthony Swofford's 2003 memoir of the same name.

The 2016 Bollywood movie Airlift is based on the 1990 airlift of stranded Indian citizens from Kuwait during the Gulf War. As for music, Gil Scott-Heron's song "Work for Peace" from the 1994 album Spirits was a response to the war. Additionally, the 2002 audio documentary The Fire This Time features contemporaneous interviews and media selections set to electronic music by various artists.

== See also ==
- The Gulf War Did Not Take Place
- 1973 Samita border skirmish
- Gulf War curfew in Palestine
- United States Air Force order of battle in the Gulf War
- Iraq–Russia relations
- Loss-of-strength gradient
- Military history of the United States
- Naval organization of the U.S.-led coalition during the Gulf War
- Operation Granby
- Post–World War II air-to-air combat losses
- SIPRI Arms Transfers Database, Iraq 1973–1990
- United Nations Iraq–Kuwait Observation Mission

== Bibliography ==
- Arbuthnot, Felicity (17 September 2000). "Allies Deliberately Poisoned Iraq Public Water Supply in Gulf War". Sunday Herald. Scotland. Archived from the original on 5 December 2005.
- Atkinson, Rick; Devroy, Ann (12 January 1991). "U.S. Claims Iraqi Nuclear Reactors Hit Hard". The Washington Post.
- Austvik, Ole Gunnar (1993). "The War Over the Price of Oil". International Journal of Global Energy Issues.
- Bard, Mitchell. "The Gulf War". Jewish Virtual Library.
- Barzilai, Gad (1993). Klieman, Aharon; Shidlo, Gil (eds.). The Gulf Crisis and Its Global Aftermath. Routledge. ISBN 978-0-415-08002-6.
- Blum, William (1995). Killing Hope: U.S. Military and CIA Interventions Since World War II. Common Courage Press. ISBN 978-1-56751-052-2.
- Bolkom, Christopher; Pike, Jonathan. "Attack Aircraft Proliferation: Areas for Concern". Archived from the original on 27 December 2005.
- Brands, H. W. (March 2004). "George Bush and the Gulf War of 1991". Presidential Studies Quarterly. 34 (1): 113–131. doi:10.1111/j.1741-5705.2004.00038.x. ISSN 0360-4918. JSTOR 27552567.
- Chardell, Daniel (Summer 2023). "The Origins of the Iraqi Invasion of Kuwait Reconsidered". Texas National Security Review. The University of Texas at Austin. doi:10.26153/TSW/47415.
- Brown, Miland (2005). "First Persian Gulf War". Archived from the original on 21 January 2007.
- Clancy, Tom; Horner, Chuck (1999). Every Man a Tiger: The Gulf War Air Campaign. Putnam. ISBN 978-0-399-14493-6.
- Cleveland, William L. (2013). A History of the Modern Middle East (5th ed.). Boulder, CO: Westview Press. p. 450. ISBN 978-0-8133-4833-9. "Last paragraph: "On 16 January 1991 the air war against Iraq began"
- "25 years since the 'Locusta' Operation". Difesa Online. 25 September 2015.
- Emering, Edward John (2005). The Decorations and Medals of the Persian Gulf War (1990 to 1991). Claymont, DE: Orders and Medals Society of America. ISBN 978-1-890974-18-3. OCLC 62859116.
- Finlan, Alastair (2003). The Gulf War 1991. Osprey. ISBN 978-1-84176-574-7.
- Forbes, Daniel (15 May 2000). "Gulf War Crimes?". Salon. Archived from the original on 6 August 2011.
- Frank, Andre Gunder (20 May 1991). "Third World War in the Gulf: A New World Order". Political Economy Notebooks for Study and Research, No. 14, pp. 5–34.
- Frontline. "The Gulf War: an in-depth examination of the 1990–1991 Persian Gulf crisis". PBS.
- Gordon, Michael R.; Trainor, Bernard E. (1995). The Generals' War: The Inside Story of the Conflict in the Gulf (First hardcover ed.). Boston: Little, Brown and Co. ISBN 0316321729. OCLC 30702180. 1996 Trade paperback reprint ed. (registration required).
- Gordon, Michael R.; Trainor, Bernard E. (2006). Cobra II: The Inside Story of the Invasion and Occupation of Iraq (First hardcover ed.). New York: Pantheon Books. ISBN 9780375422621. OCLC 1029284232.
- Gordon, Michael R.; Trainor, Bernard E. (2013). The Endgame: The Inside Story of the Struggle for Iraq, from George W. Bush to Barack Obama. New York: Random House. ISBN 1843547805. OCLC 1031963363.
- Hawley, T. M. (1992). Against the Fires of Hell: The Environmental Disaster of the Gulf War. New York u.a.: Harcourt Brace Jovanovich. ISBN 978-0-15-103969-2.
- Hiro, Dilip (1992). Desert Shield to Desert Storm: The Second Gulf War. Routledge. ISBN 978-0-415-90657-9.
- Hoskinson, Ronald Andrew; Jarvis, Norman (1994). "Gulf War Photo Gallery".
- Kepel, Gilles (2002). "From the Gulf War to the Taliban Jihad". Jihad: the trail of political Islam. Cambridge, Mass: Harvard University Press. ISBN 978-0-674-01090-1.
- Khadduri, Majid; Ghareeb, Edmund (2001). War in the Gulf, 1990-91: The Iraq-Kuwait Conflict and Its Implications. Oxford University Press.
- Latimer, Jon (2001). Deception in War. London: John Murray. ISBN 978-0-7195-5605-0.
- Little, Allan (1 December 1997). "Iraq coming in from the cold?". BBC.
- MacArthur, John (7 October 1993). "Independent Policy Forum Luncheon Honoring".
- Makiya, Kanan (1993). Cruelty and Silence: War, Tyranny, Uprising, and the Arab World. W.W. Norton. ISBN 978-0-393-03108-9.
- "Iraq (1990)". Ministero Della Difesa (in Italian).
- Moise, Edwin. "Bibliography: The First U.S. – Iraq War: Desert Shield and Desert Storm (1990–1991)".
- Munro, Alan (2006). Arab Storm: Politics and Diplomacy Behind the Gulf War. I.B. Tauris. ISBN 978-1-84511-128-1.
- Naval Historical Center (15 May 1991). "The United States Navy in Desert Shield/Desert Storm". Archived from the original on 2 December 2005.
- Niksch, Larry A.; Sutter, Robert G. (23 May 1991). "Japan's Response to the Persian Gulf Crisis: Implications for U.S. -Japan Relations". UNT Digital Library. Congressional Research Service, Library of Congress.
- Odgers, George (1999). 100 Years of Australians at War. Sydney: Lansdowne. ISBN 978-1-86302-669-7.
- Riley, Jonathon (2010). Decisive Battles: From Yorktown to Operation Desert Storm. Continuum. p. 207. ISBN 978-1-84725-250-0. "SAS first units ground January into iraq."
- Roberts, Paul William (1998). The Demonic Comedy: Some Detours in the Baghdad of Saddam Hussein. New York: Farrar, Straus and Giroux. ISBN 978-0-374-13823-3.
- Sifry, Micah; Cerf, Christopher (1991). The Gulf War Reader. New York, NY: Random House. ISBN 978-0-8129-1947-9.
- Simons, Geoff (2004). Iraq: from Sumer to post-Saddam (3rd ed.). Palgrave Macmillan. ISBN 978-1-4039-1770-6.
- Simpson, John (1991). From the House of War: John Simpson in the Gulf. Arrow Books.
- Smith, Jean Edward (1992). George Bush's War. New York: Henry Holt. ISBN 978-0-8050-1388-7.
- Tucker, Spencer (2010). The Encyclopedia of Middle East Wars: The United States in the Persian Gulf, Afghanistan, and Iraq Conflicts. ABC-Clio. ISBN 978-1-84725-250-0.
- Turnley, Peter (December 2002). "The Unseen Gulf War (photo essay)".
- Walker, Paul F.; Stambler, Eric (May 1991). "…And the Dirty Little Weapons". Bulletin of the Atomic Scientists. 47 (4): 20–24. Bibcode:1991BuAtS..47d..20W. doi:10.1080/00963402.1991.11459971. ISSN 0096-3402.
- Wright, Steven (2007). The United States and Persian Gulf Security: The Foundations of the War on Terror. Ithaca Press. ISBN 978-0-86372-321-6.
- "Report to Congress on the Conduct of the Persian Gulf War, Chapter 6". Archived from the original on 31 August 2019.

=== Films ===
- Dawn of the World (2008)
- Bravo Two Zero (1999)
- Courage Under Fire (1996)
- The Finest Hour (1991)
- The Heroes of Desert Storm (1991)
- Lessons of Darkness (1992) (a documentary)
- Live from Baghdad (2002)
- Towelhead (2007)
- Three Kings (1999)
- The Manchurian Candidate (2004)
- Used as a back drop for the film The Big Lebowski (1998). It is frequently discussed as well.
- Used in retconned backstory for The Punisher (2004)
- Airlift (2016) – A Bollywood film based on the true story of the evacuation of 170,000 Indians stranded in the war zone.

=== Novels ===
- Braving the Fear – The True Story of Rowdy US Marines in the Gulf War (by Douglas Foster) ISBN 978-1-4137-9902-6
- Bravo Two Zero (by Andy McNab) ISBN 978-0-440-21880-7
- The Fist of God (by Frederick Forsyth) ISBN 978-0-553-09126-7
- Glass (Pray the Electrons Back to Sand) (by James Chapman)
- Gulf in the War Story: A US Navy Personnel Manager Confides in You (diary from inside the real Top Gun, VF-1 "Wolfpack" by Bob Graham) ISBN 978-1-4751-4705-6
- Hogs dime novel series by James Ferro
- Jarhead (by Anthony Swofford) ISBN 978-0-7432-3535-8
- Savant (by James Follett)
- Summer 1990 (by Firyal AlShalabi)
- Third Graders at War (by Felix G)
- To Die in Babylon by Harold Livingston
- M60 vs T-62 Cold War Combatants 1956–92 (by Lon Nordeen & David Isby)
