= Battle of 73 Easting =

Tank battle fought during the Gulf War

- Part of the Gulf War
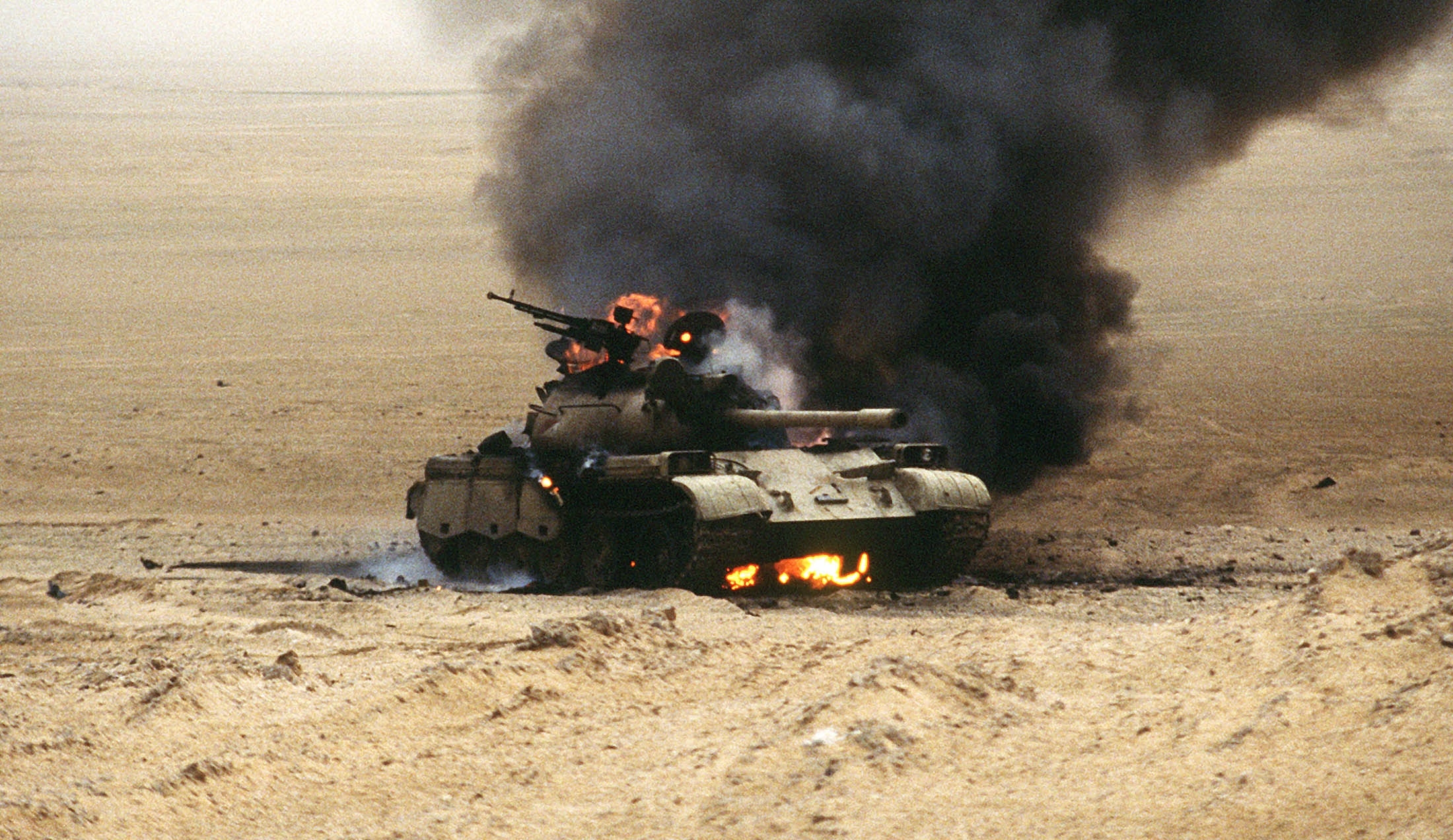
- A destroyed Iraqi Type 69 tank
Date	26–27 February 1991
Location	Southeastern Iraq 29°50′43″N 46°47′27″E
Result	Coalition victory

Belligerents
United States; United Kingdom	Iraq

Commanders and leaders
(United States) Norman Schwarzkopf (United States) Frederick Franks (United States) Thomas G. Rhame (United Kingdom) Rupert Smith	(Ba'athist Iraq) Salah Aboud Mahmoud (Ba'athist Iraq) Saheb Mohammed Alaw (Ba'athist Iraq) Ahmad Abdullah Saleh (Ba'athist Iraq) Ayad Futayyih Al-Rawi (Ba'athist Iraq) Bassil Omar Al-Shalham

Units involved
(United States) VII Corps; (United States) 1st Infantry Division; (United States) 1st Armored Division; (United Kingdom) 1st Armoured Division; (United States) 2nd Armored Division; (United States) 3rd Armored Division; (United States) 210th Field Artillery Brigade; (United States) 2nd Armored Cavalry Regiment; (United States) 1st Squadron, 4th Cavalry Regiment	(Ba'athist Iraq) Tawakalna Division; (Ba'athist Iraq) 10th Armored Division; (Ba'athist Iraq) 12th Armored Division; (Ba'athist Iraq) 52nd Armored Division; (Ba'athist Iraq) 25th Infantry Division; (Ba'athist Iraq) 26th Infantry Division; (Ba'athist Iraq) 31st Infantry Division; (Ba'athist Iraq) 48th Infantry Division

Strength
4,000 infantry 200–300 armoured vehicles	2,500–3,500 infantry 300–400 armoured vehicles

Casualties and losses
6 killed (2nd ACR); 19 wounded (2nd ACR); 1 M3 Bradley lost to enemy fire	600–1,000 killed and wounded 1,300+ prisoners 160 tanks 180 personnel carriers 12 artillery pieces 80 wheeled vehicles Several anti-aircraft artillery systems

The Battle of 73 Easting was fought on 26 February 1991, during the Gulf War, between Coalition armored forces (US VII Corps and UK 1st Armoured Division) and Iraqi armored forces (Republican Guard and Tawakalna Division). It was named for a UTM north–south coordinate line (an "Easting", measured in kilometers and readable on GPS receivers) that was used as a phase line by Coalition forces to measure their progress through the desert. The battle was later described by Lt. John Mecca, a participant, as "the last great tank battle of the 20th century." This battle took place several hours after another, smaller, tank battle at Al Busayyah.

The main U.S. unit in the battle was the 2nd Armored Cavalry Regiment (2nd ACR), a 4,500 man reconnaissance and security element assigned to VII Corps. It consisted of three ground squadrons (1st, 2nd and 3rd), an attack helicopter squadron (4th), and a support squadron. Each ground squadron was made up of three cavalry troops, a tank company, a self-propelled howitzer battery, and a headquarters troop. Each troop comprised 120 soldiers, 12–13 M3 Bradley fighting vehicles and nine M1A1 Abrams main battle tanks. Task Force 1-41 Infantry breached the berm on the borders between Saudi Arabia and Iraq which was the initial Iraqi defensive position and performed reconnaissance and counter reconnaissance missions prior to the 2nd ACR's actions. This generally included destroying or repelling the Iraqis' reconnaissance elements and denying their commander any observation of friendly forces. The corps' main body consisted of the American 2nd Armored Division (Forward), 1st Armored Division (1st AD), 3rd Armored Division (3rd AD), 1st Infantry Division (1st ID), and the British 1st Armoured Division (1 AD).

The job of the 2nd ACR was to cross the border and advance east as a forward scouting element, led by cavalry scouts in lightly armored M3A1 Bradleys with highly advanced thermals to detect enemy positions. Following closely behind were M1A1 Abrams tanks covering them from the rear, ready to move forward and engage the enemy. Originally advancing ahead of the 3rd Armored Division until late on 25 February, they shifted to the east and ahead of the advancing 1st Infantry Division as it moved north from its initial objectives. The regiment's mission was to strip away enemy security forces, clear the way of significant defenses, and locate the Republican Guard's defensive positions so they could be engaged by the full weight of the armored forces and artillery of the 1st Infantry Division.

On the night of 23/24 February, in accordance with General Norman Schwarzkopf's plan for the ground assault called "Operation Desert Sabre", VII Corps raced east from Saudi Arabia into Iraq in a wide, sweeping maneuver later described by Schwarzkopf as a "Hail Mary." The Corps had two goals: to cut off Iraqi retreat from Kuwait, and to destroy five elite Republican Guard divisions near the Iraq–Kuwait border that might attack the Arab and Marine units moving into Kuwait to the south. Initial Iraqi resistance was light and scattered after the breach, and the 2nd ACR fought only minor engagements until 25 February.

The primary battle was conducted by 2nd ACR's three squadrons of about 4,000 soldiers, along with the 1st Infantry Division's two leading brigades (2nd Armored Division), which attacked and destroyed the Iraqi 18th Mechanized Brigade and 37th Armored Brigade of the Tawakalna Division, each consisting of between 2,500 and 3,000 personnel.

== Plan ==
2nd ACR was to advance east, locate and engage the enemy, determine his dispositions, and then allow the mechanized brigades of 1st ID to pass through to finish destroying the Iraqis. 2nd ACR's limit of advance changed during the operation. VII Corps Fragmentary Order Seven, issued during the night of 25–26 February, made 60 Easting 2nd ACR's initial limit of advance. After 2nd ACR made contact with the Republican Guard's security zone, Corps changed the limit to 70 Easting. Along that line, 1st ID would pass through 2nd ACR and push on to objectives further east. VII Corps commander Lieutenant General Frederick M. Franks Jr. ordered 2nd ACR commander Colonel Don Holder to locate the enemy but avoid becoming decisively engaged.

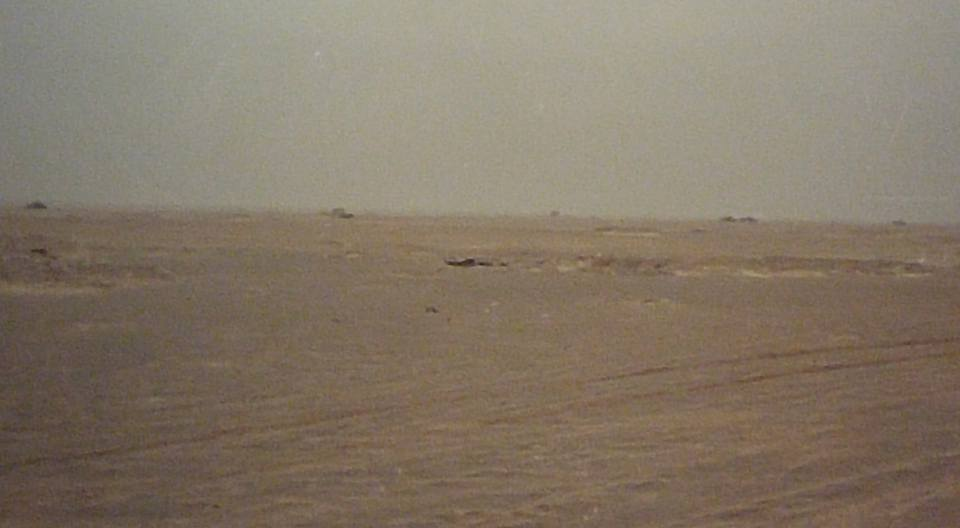
An Iraqi defensive position in Task Force 1-41 Infantry's sector of operations during the Battle of 73 Easting. The tops of Iraqi tanks can be seen as they sit in defensive entrenchments. More destroyed Iraqi armor sits in the distant background.

2nd ACR's three armored cavalry squadrons deployed in line, with Second Squadron in the north, Third Squadron in the center, and First Squadron in the south. Fourth Squadron (the combat aviation squadron) flew reconnaissance and attack missions chiefly in the northern and central zones. Weather restricted flight operations severely, and kept Fourth Squadron grounded for about half of the daylight hours. Unusually for a corps covering force, 2nd ACR lacked a reserve tank or mechanized infantry battalion.

Moving through the Republican Guards' security area on the morning of the 26th undetected, 2nd ACR encountered the Tawakalna Division and 12th Iraqi Armored Division (12th AD) in a line facing them with Tawakalna in the north and 12th AD in the center and south. All Iraqi units occupied well-constructed defensive emplacements and had prepared alternate positions which enabled them to reorient to the west to face VII Corps's attack. 12th AD's assignment to the Republican Guard was not known at the time of the engagement.

Despite extensive aerial and artillery bombardment by U.S. forces, most Iraqi units defending along 70 Easting remained effective. 2nd ACR employed M270 MLRS artillery fire from the supporting 27th Field Artillery Regiment, as well as air strikes, and attack helicopters (both AH-64 Apaches of 2-1 Aviation and AH-1 Cobras of Fourth Squadron) against the Republican Guard units as the armored cavalry squadrons moved east through the security zone. Sandstorms slowed this movement throughout the day, restricting visibility to as little as 400 metres (1,300 ft).

== Approach to the 70 Easting ==
During the period of 23 February 1991 the 2nd Armored Cavalry Regiment, with its attached operational control, attacked into Southern Iraq in the lead of VII Corps with such audacity that the Dragoon Battle Group quickly overwhelmed superior enemy forces, demoralizing them and taking hundreds of enemy prisoners. The 2nd and 3rd Squadrons of the regiment destroyed two brigades of the Iraqi Republican Guards Tawakalna Division. The 2nd Squadron, 2nd ACR alone contributed 55 Iraqi tanks destroyed, 45 other armored vehicles, an equal number of trucks, hundreds of Iraqi infantry KIA, and 865 Iraqi soldiers taken prisoner.

On 24 February 1991, as part of the 1st Infantry Division (Mechanized) and VII Corps main effort, Task Force 3-37th Armor breached the Iraqi defense , clearing four passage lanes and expanding the gap under direct enemy fire. The Task Force then attacked 300 kilometers across southern Iraq into northern Kuwait, severing Iraqi lines of communication, and then drove north once again into Iraq to assist in the seizure of the City of Safwan and the securing of the Safwan Air Base for the Coalition Forces–Iraqi cease-fire negotiations. During the operation, over 50 enemy combat vehicles were destroyed and over 1,700 prisoners were captured.

26th of February, the 2nd ACR began on the VII Corps Objective, still oriented to the northeast. In the early morning hours, Lt. Colonel Scott Marcy's Third Squadron fought companies of the Iraqi 50th Armored Brigade, which had moved into the regiment's southern area to confirm reports that allied units were in the vicinity.

At 05:22 the regiment received Corps Frag Plan Seven, which adjusted its zone and objective and directed all Corps units to move east to attack units of the Republican Guard. The order adjusted the boundary between 2nd ACR and the 1st UK Armoured Division to the south and the early movements of the day involved re-orienting the regiment's squadrons and coordinating with 1st UK Armored Division along the new boundary, the 80 Northing.

The aviation squadron led by Lt. Colonel Don Olson established a screen along the 50 Easting by 7 am, and by 8 am the armored cavalry squadrons had moved into their new zones. Third Squadron, operating in the center, destroyed a T-72 tank before 8 am, establishing the first ground contact with the Iraqi Republican Guard's Tawakalna Division. All three squadrons were in contact with security forces by 9 am but a violent sandstorm blew into the area and movement to the regiment's limit of advance, the 60 Easting, took until 11 am.

Air cavalry operations ceased just after 9 a.m. and would not resume until afternoon. Lt. Colonel Tony Isaac's First Squadron meanwhile encountered scattered enemy positions in the south and by noon had reported destroying 23 T-55 tanks, 25 armored personnel carriers, six artillery pieces and numerous trucks. Lt. Colonel Mike Kobbe's Second Squadron troops all reported resistance from small Tawakalna Division security outposts while Third Squadron destroyed similar outposts in the Regimental center. Lt. Gen. Franks visited the regiment's main command post just before 1 p.m. There, the regimental executive officer, Lt. Colonel Roger Jones, and the S2, Major Steve Campbell, briefed him on the situation and informed him that sensors were reporting movement of tracked vehicles to the north out of the regiment's zone.

By 3 p.m. Third Armored Division had reached the 50 Easting and begun to move abreast of the regiment to the north. 1st Infantry Division's movement to join the fight was taking longer than expected, however. Lt. General Franks therefore directed the Second Armored Cavalry to continue its attack as far as the 70 Easting and to make contact with the Republican Guard's main defenses and prevent their movement. At the same time, he ordered the regiment to avoid becoming decisively engaged, meaning to refrain from committing all its maneuver forces and thereby losing freedom of action.

Colonel Holder issued a Fragmentary Order at 3:20 to comply with the Corps Commander's directive and by 3:45 Second Squadron's E and G Troops were in contact with well-organized defenses of the Tawakalna Division. At the same time the Third and First squadrons in the center and south moved to clear their zones, encountering T-72s in Third Squadron's north and T-62 and T-55 tanks of the Iraqi 12th Armored Division further south.

Fourth Squadron's air scouts rejoined the operation as the weather cleared around 3 p.m. Air scouts identified enemy defenses to the front of Second and Third Squadrons and attack helicopters struck several of the security outposts.

By 16:10, further south near the east–west UTM coordinate line 00 Northing, 2nd ACR's E- ("Eagle") Troop received fire from an Iraqi dismounted outpost, a dug-in Iraqi ZSU-23-4 and several occupied buildings in an Iraqi village. The American scouts returned fire with their tanks and Bradleys, silenced the Iraqi guns, took prisoners, and continued east. They advanced three more kilometers east to the 70 Easting line. More enemy fire came in and was immediately returned.

== 73 Easting ==
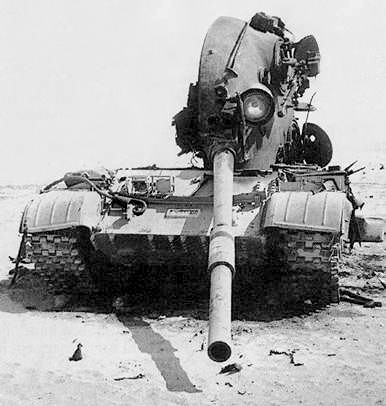
An Iraqi T-62 knocked out by 3rd Armored Division fire

The Battle of 73 Easting refers narrowly to the violent armored combat action that took place in the final hours of 2nd ACR's covering force operation in the zone of Second Squadron and in the northern third of the Third Squadron zone. In the battle, four of the 2nd ACR's armored cavalry troops, Troops E, G, and I with Troop K contributing to I Troop's fight (totaling about 36 M1A1 tanks), defeated two enemy brigades, the Tawakalna Division's 18th Brigade and, later in the day, the 9th Armored Brigade.

The defending Iraqi forces, elements of Tawakalna's 18th Mechanized Brigade and the 12th Armored Division's 9th Armored Brigade, had arrived in their positions on the evening of 24 February and had oriented to the west to protect the main supply route, the IPSA pipeline Road, just to their rear. The Iraqi resistance that 2ACR met on the previous day had been from the 50th Armored Brigade whose mission had been to cover the preparation of that defense.

The Battle was part of the larger operation and, as it went on, the Third and First Squadron troops in the southern part of the zone continued to fight through the security area of the Republican Guard and fix enemy units of the 12th Armored Division. First Squadron, the regiment's southernmost squadron cleared its zone of remnants of the 50th Armored Brigade before making contact with the 37th Brigade of the 12th Iraqi Armored Division, fighting to the south of the Tawakalna Division. Scout and attack helicopters of Fourth Squadron and 2-1 Aviation Battalion (AH-64 Apache) supported the fight as weather allowed.

The regiment moved from the 60 Easting with eight of its nine cavalry troops generally abreast of each other. (Lt. Colonel Kobbe had pulled his Troop F out of the Second Squadron's leading echelon when his zone narrowed.) The operation escalated into a full-out battle as E Troop (call sign "Eagle") maneuvered to the 70 Easting around 3:45 p.m. Heavy combat then spread to the south as I Troop of the Third Squadron closed the gap between the two squadrons and joined the fight. G Troop's attack to the north of Captain H. R. McMaster's E Troop made contact with defending units farther east and combat there became intense around 16:45 Fighting continued into darkness as the Iraqi division commander reinforced the 18th Brigade with his 9th Armored Brigade in the G Troop zone.

At 16:10 Eagle Troop received fire from an Iraqi infantry position in a cluster of buildings at UTM PU 6801. Eagle Troop Abrams and Bradleys returned fire, silenced the Iraqi guns, took prisoners, and continued east with the two tank platoons leading. The nine M1A1 tanks of Eagle Troop destroyed 28 Iraqi tanks, 16 personnel carriers and 30 trucks in 23 minutes with no American losses.

At about 16:20 Eagle crested a low rise and surprised an Iraqi tank company set up in a reverse slope defence on the 70 Easting. Captain McMaster, leading the attack, immediately engaged that position, destroying the first of the eight enemy tanks to his front. His two tank platoons finished the rest.

Three kilometers to the east McMaster could see T-72s in prepared positions. Continuing his attack past the 70 limit of advance, he fought his way through an infantry defensive position and on to high ground along the 74 Easting. There he encountered and destroyed another enemy tank unit of eighteen T-72s. In that action the Iraqis stood their ground and attempted to maneuver against the troop. This was the first determined defense the regiment had encountered in its three days of operations. Still, the Iraqi troops had been surprised because of the inclement weather and were quickly destroyed by the better trained and better equipped American troops.

After defeating that force, McMaster sent a scout platoon of two M3 Bradleys north to regain contact with G Troop. In doing that the scout platoon encountered another Iraqi tank position of thirteen T-72s. The lightly armored Bradleys, each equipped only with a 25-mm cannon and two TOW missiles, are intended for reconnaissance, not direct engagement with armored tanks. Despite a misfire, and having to reload the launchers in the face of the enemy, the two Bradleys destroyed 5 tanks before help arrived.

Other 2nd ACR Troops I (call sign "Iron"), K ("Killer"), and G ("Ghost") joined the fight minutes later. Iron Troop of Third Squadron had halted around the 67 Easting to control the limit of advance with its tank cannon. As the troop moved north to secure its northern boundary around 16:45, it came under fire from the same group of buildings E Troop had fought through an hour earlier.

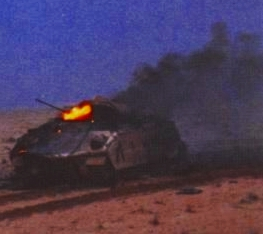
A wrecked Bradley IFV K-12 burns after being hit by Iraqi tank fire during the first stages of the battle

Captain Dan Miller, commanding I Troop, silenced the resistance with return fire and then attacked to the 70 Easting. There he confronted T-72s in defensive positions south of those that E Troop had just destroyed. With initial support from Captain Mac Haszard's K Troop, Miller's tanks destroyed sixteen enemy tanks on that position and then attacked through it. Just beyond the defenses, I Troop observed another formation of enemy tanks moving in its direction and attacked it with tank and TOW fire. During that engagement, TOW missile fire from a K Troop Bradley struck and destroyed an I Troop Bradley, wounding all three crewmen. Before returning to positions along the 70 Easting, I Troop located the defending battalion's command post and destroyed its command bunker and security forces.

By 16:30, Captain Joe Sartiano's G Troop had gained a position on a ridge overlooking a wadi at and parallel to the 73 Easting, north of E Troop. As the regiment's northernmost unit, G Troop secured an open flank that would later become the 3rd Armored Division sector when they arrived 5hrs later. Sartiano oriented due east, they engaged two Iraqi BMP-1s within bunkers, facing south. Afterwards, 2nd Platoon of G Troop an M1A1 tank platoon (White-1), lead 1LT Andy Kilgore, reported thermal signatures beyond the smoke and dust of the sand storm they were engulfed in, and requested permission to move east forward past the burning BMPs.

Taking his platoon of tanks beyond the plumes of smoke, he moved on a Republican Guard motorized rifle company position facing south-southwest, Sartiano lost visual contact with Kilgore’s platoon, as 2nd PLT LT Kilgore’s moved to engage with multiple contacts consisting of T-72s, BMP-1s, and infantry dismounts they found beyond the smoke. LT Kilgore’s Platoon exhausted a variety of weapons, including main guns of the M1A1, coaxial machine guns, turret mounted M240 machine gun and a single M1911 pistol.

During this time, Sartiano desperately attempted to contact LT Kilgore’s platoon over the troop network, however, LT Kilgore had switched down to his platoon communications network to direct and concentrate the fires of his platoon. Once the fight was over, LT Kilgore’s PLT rejoined Ghost Troops they as moved to their ordered limit of advance at 73 Easting. They were later relieved by H Co of their squadron 2/2ACR after passing 1st Squadron, 4th Cavalry Regiment of the First Infantry Division through their lines at 2030hrs after most of the heavy fighting in the Ghost Troop sector had ceased.

Sartiano's men engaged Iraqi 18th Brigade tanks that initially were in defensive positions. Very quickly G Troop found itself facing counterattacks by tank units of the Tawakalna Division and the Iraqi 12th Armored Division. Other Iraqi units attempted to retreat to the north along the wadi, which led them directly into G Troop's position.

By 18:30, the first of several waves of Iraqi T-72 and T-55 tanks advanced into the wadi. Fierce fighting ensued as wave after wave of tanks and infantry charged the troop. Combat became so intense at times that only massed artillery and mortar fires, attack helicopters and Air Force close air support prevented the enemy from closing with G Troop. At one point a military intelligence (MI) platoon from the 2nd ACR's 502nd MI Company had to suspend its signal intelligence operation and return the fire of Iraqi soldiers who exited a burning BMP-1 and continued to attack.

During the fierce six-hour battle, the G Troop fire support team called in 720 howitzer and MLRS rounds, while using its own mortars continually to turn back attackers at close range. By 21:00, G Troop had expended nearly half of its TOW missiles and was becoming short of 25 mm and 120 mm cannon ammunition. To remedy the emergency, Lt Colonel Kobbe sent his tank company, Captain Bruce Tyler's Company H ("Hawk"), to relieve the troop. By then, G Troop had destroyed "at least two companies of Iraqi armor. Hundreds of Iraqi infantrymen and their lightly armored transporters lay scattered on the wadi floor."

G Troop lost one M3 Bradley to Iraqi IFV fire and one soldier, Sergeant Nels A. Moller, the gunner of the Bradley, was killed. The Bradley's TOW launcher was inoperative, and the 25 mm Bushmaster Cannon had jammed. While the crew was attempting to get the cannon back in action, an Iraqi BMP-1, thought to have been disabled by a tank shell, punched through the Bradley's armor, fired and hit the vehicle's turret with 73 mm cannon fire. Moller died instantly and the remainder of the crew evacuated the damaged vehicle.

Artillery fire and air strikes played a large role in the battle, especially in the far north. In direct support of 2nd ACR, Colonel Garrett Bourne's 210th FA Brigade fired missions out to the 78 Easting. Close air support missions struck targets in greater depth, preventing some Iraqi units from closing with G Troop or escaping the battle area. Attack helicopters flew in support of air scouts at key intervals during the day and the 2-1 Aviation Battalion's Apache helicopters, led by Lt. Colonel John Ward, destroyed two batteries of enemy artillery and struck march units along the IPSA Pipeline Road at 16:30, just as the battle began in earnest.

In total, the regimental fire support officer reported employing 1,382 rounds of 155 mm howitzer ammunition (high-explosive, dual-purpose improved munitions and rocket-assisted HE projectiles) and 147 MLRS rockets on 26 February. The 210th FA Brigade commander estimated that his two FA battalions and single M270 MLRS, C Battery 4th 27th FA, destroyed 17 tanks, seven APCs, six artillery pieces and around 70 other vehicles. The number of vehicles damaged by artillery was greater. The number of enemy infantry casualties caused by indirect fire proved impossible to determine but almost certainly exceeded the thirty infantrymen claimed.

Sporadic fire continued throughout the night, but no major engagements occurred after 22:00. The regiment used artillery fire and some close air support between the end of active fighting and the arrival of the 1st Infantry Division at the line of contact.

Based on the intelligence gained during the battle, Colonel Holder advised the corps commander that the 1st Infantry Division should pass through the southern units of the regiment. Committing the division in that area would keep it clear of the chaotic post-battle conditions to the north and, more importantly, would steer the main attack around now-known positions of the Republican Guard divisions.

Lt. General Franks accepted that recommendation and, beginning around 02:00, two brigades of the 1st Infantry Division passed through the regiment's positions along the 70 Easting. When the division had completed passage of all its combat units around 6 a.m., the Second Cavalry Regiment became part of VII Corps' reserve.

The 2nd and 3rd Squadrons of the 2nd ACR destroyed two brigades of the Iraqi Republican Guards Tawakalna Division in the Battle of 73 Easting. The 2nd Squadron, 2nd ACR alone contributed 55 Iraqi tanks destroyed, 45 other armored vehicles, an equal number of trucks, hundreds of Iraqi infantry KIA, and 865 Iraqi soldiers taken prisoner. The 2nd Cavalry Regiment also captured 2,000 prisoners, destroyed 159 enemy tanks, and 260 other vehicles. The regiment's losses include 6 dragoons killed, and 19 wounded. The 2nd Cavalry Regiment would travel over 155 miles during combat operations.

== U.S. 3rd Armored Division participation ==
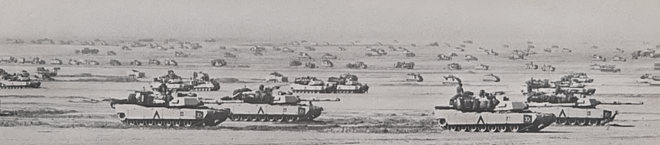
M1A1 Abrams Tanks from the 3rd Armored Division First Brigade along the Line of Departure

On 26 February the U.S. 3rd Armored Division faced the Republican Guard "Tawakalna" Division, the Iraqi 52nd Armored Division and elements of the 17th and the 10th Armored Divisions. The division engaged in full scale tank battles for the first time since World War II, and as one of the division's veterans states "There was more than enough action for everyone".(HTTPS certificate error)

After over 300 kilometers movement to contact the 2nd Brigade, 3rd Armored Division engaged enemy forces in prepared defensive positions, engaging the enemy with direct fire, massive artillery and Army aviation. The 2nd Brigade, 3rd Armored Division destroyed the first lines of defense and an attempted armored counterattack.

The 1st Brigade, 3rd Armored Division engaged enemy forces in a large bunker complex with direct and indirect fires. 1st Brigade, 3rd Armored Division's battle formation sliced through successive enemy defensive belts, destroying armored vehicles with marching fires and capturing hundreds of prisoners.

Action continued after nightfall, and by 1840 hours, the ground and air elements of the 3rd AD could report over 20 tanks, 14 APCs, several trucks and some artillery pieces destroyed. That same evening, the 4th Battalion, 32d Armor lost the division's first casualties in a Bradley Fighting Vehicle to 25mm cannon fire – with two soldiers killed and three wounded. During the night, both darkness and sandstorms hampered soldiers' visibility, but thermal sighting systems on board the M1A1 Abrams tanks and Bradleys allowed gunners to knock out Iraqi targets.

The U.S. 1st Armored Division and the 3rd Armored Division had destroyed over 76 Iraqi tanks and 84 infantry fighting vehicles by the end of the battle.

== Task Force 1-41 Infantry participation ==
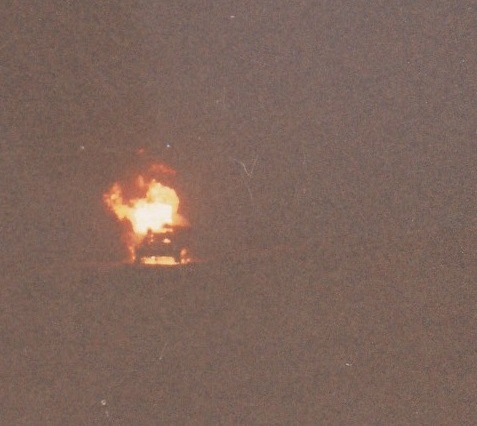
An Iraqi tank destroyed by Task Force 1-41 Infantry during a night combat operation during the Gulf war, February 1991.

Task Force 1-41 Infantry served at the Battle of 73 Easting with the 1st Infantry Division (Mechanized) along with the 2nd Armored Cavalry Regiment. They were responsible for destroying the Iraqi 18th Mechanized and 9th Armored Brigades of the Republican Guard Tawakalna Mechanized Infantry Division and the Iraqi 26th Infantry Division. The Tawakalna Republican Guard Division was Iraq's most powerful division which included approximately 14,000 soldiers, 220 T-72 tanks, 284 infantry fighting vehicles, 126 artillery pieces, and 18 MLRS.

In moving to and through the Battle of 73 Easting, 2nd ACR and the 1st Infantry division's lead brigades, which included Task Force 1-41, destroyed 160 tanks, 180 personnel carriers, 12 artillery pieces and more than 80 wheeled vehicles, along with several anti-aircraft artillery systems during the battle.

== 74 Easting and beyond ==
By 22:30, the battle at 2nd ACR's front, at 74 Easting, was ending with most of the engaged Iraqi elements burning or destroyed as the 1st Infantry Division began its forward passage of lines. The 1st Infantry Division passed through the 2nd Armored Cavalry Regiment's line in total darkness and continued to advance on Objective Norfolk, an area encompassing the intersection of the IPSA Pipeline Road, several desert trails, and a large Iraqi supply depot. Now, instead of three armored cavalry squadrons, the Iraqi 18th and 37th Armored Brigades faced six heavy battalions of American tanks and infantry fighting vehicles and another six battalions of 155 mm field artillery.

At approximately 23:30, yet another encounter took place: Lt Colonel Taylor Jones's 3rd Battalion, 66th Armor, of Task Force 1-41 Infantry ran into an Iraqi tank battalion equipped with T-55s. As before, the Iraqis did not run or surrender, but manned their vehicles and weapons to face the advancing Americans. Initially, many American units advanced past Iraqi tanks and crews, who were in shelters or had not yet turned on their engines and so did not appear to be threats in the American crew's thermal sights.

A slightly disoriented Bradley platoon, attempting to follow the M1 tanks, moved across the front of these Iraqi positions, illuminated by burning vehicles behind them. The Iraqis took advantage of this excellent target and opened fire from three directions. The initial volley hit a Bradley, killing three American soldiers. An American tank company trailing the lead units observed the Iraqi fire and joined the melee, quickly destroying three T-55s before they could get off another shot. At the same time, several small antitank rockets hit the Bradley platoon.

From the perspective of the tank gunners looking through the thermal sights of the approaching M1 tanks, these flashes appeared to be T-55 tanks shooting at them. The American gunners, convinced they were fighting against a determined enemy, opened fire and hit three more Bradleys. The brigade commander, Colonel David Weisman, decided to pull the battalions back, consolidate, and use his artillery to destroy the aggressive Iraqi infantry.

=== Battle of Norfolk ===
The forces involved in the battle were the American 1st Infantry Division, the 3rd Brigade of the 2nd Armored Division (fwd) (Hell on Wheels) and the Iraqi 18th Mechanized and 9th Armored Brigades of the Republican Guard Tawakalna Mechanized Infantry Division along with elements from eleven other Iraqi divisions including the Iraqi 26th, 48th, 31st, and 25th Infantry Divisions. The Iraqi 52nd Armored Division was also present. The British fielded their 1st Armoured Division.

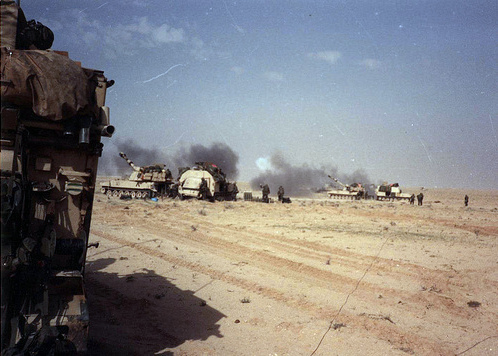
The 4th Battalion of the 3rd Field Artillery Regiment, 2nd Armored Division (FWD) conducts artillery strikes on Iraqi positions during the 1st Gulf War. 4-3 FA was the primary fire support battalion for Task Force 1-41 during the 1st Gulf War, February 1991.

Task Force 1-41 Infantry was the spearhead of the American assault into Objective Norfolk. The Iraqis halted the 1st Infantry Division's initial push into their sector only temporarily. By 00:30, 27 February, the two attacking brigades of the 1st Infantry Division were positioned along the 75 Easting, 2,000 meters east of 73 Easting. In what has since been dubbed the Battle of Norfolk, they crossed the remaining ten kilometers to their objective, Objective Norfolk, over the next three hours. Elements of approximately 11 Iraqi divisions were engaged and destroyed. By dawn, the 1st Infantry Division had taken Objective Norfolk and the fight shifted away from the 73 Easting area to 1st Armored Division's attack to the north, started at 20:00 on 26 February, and the 3rd Armored Division attack just to the south of the 1st Division.

The British 1st Armoured division was responsible for protecting the right flank of VII Corps. It was assumed by the corps' planners the Iraqi 52nd Armored Division counterattacked VII Corps once their penetration into Iraqi defenses was discovered. The British 1st Armoured Division had two brigades which participated in Operation Desert Storm, the 4th and 7th Brigades. They both rotated responsibilities as the lead brigade. The 1st Armoured was equipped with the Challenger main battle tank. With a 120mm rifled main gun, thermal optics, and Chobham armor, its only rival in theatre was the American M1A1 Abrams tank.

British infantry rode into battle on the Warrior infantry fighting vehicle. It had reasonable armor protection and a 30-mm gun. Modified versions of the vehicle included mortar carriers, Milan antitank systems, and command and control vehicles. The British also possessed a variety of light armored vehicles built upon their Scorpion chassis. British artillery was primarily American made M109 howitzers (155mm), M110 howitzers (203mm), and MLRS systems which were compatible with American systems. Their air support consisted of Gazelle helicopters, used for reconnaissance, and the Lynx helicopter. The British had their full contingent of engineer, logistics, and medical units.

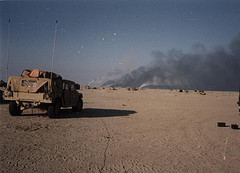
Destroyed Iraqi tanks burning at the Battle of Norfolk during the Gulf War, February 1991

This division was commanded by forty-seven-year-old Maj. General Rupert Smith. He was a member of the British Parachute Regiment and he was an expert on Soviet armor and tank tactics. His division had two brigades at its disposal. The 4th Brigade, reinforced with extra engineers and artillery, was used for breakout operations and to clear the ground at the breach. The armor-heavy 7th Brigade was used for tank-on-tank engagements.

On 25 February 1991, the 1st Armoured Division smashed into the western flank of the Iraqi 48th Infantry Division which was commanded by Brig. General Saheb Mohammed Alaw. That night the 48th Infantry Division was destroyed and General Alaw was captured by the British. That same night the British cleared two lines of enemy positions during close combat engagements. The British also destroyed several Iraqi companies of T-55 tanks. That same night other elements of the division were engaging the Iraqi 31st Infantry Division.

On 26 February 1991, British artillery units unleashed an hour long artillery strike on Iraqi positions. It was the greatest British artillery display since World War II. That same night the British 7th Brigade fought a night tank battle against an Iraqi tank battalion from the Iraqi 52nd Armored Division. After ninety minutes of battle over 50 Iraqi tanks and armored personnel carriers were destroyed. That same night the British 4th Brigade destroyed a headquarters and artillery site belonging to the 807th Brigade of the Iraqi 48th Infantry Division. British infantry units cleared Iraqi defensive positions which were occupied by the Iraqi 803rd Infantry Brigade.

After 48 hours of combat, the British 1st Armoured Division assisted in destroying or isolating four Iraqi infantry divisions (the 26th, 48th, 31st, and 25th) and had defeated the Iraqi 52nd Armored Division in several sharp engagements. By midnight there was no more organized Iraqi resistance between the 1st Armoured Division and the Persian Gulf. On this day, a British Army Challenger 1 scored the longest tank-to-tank 'kill' in military history, when it destroyed an Iraqi T-55 at a range of 4.7 km (2.9 miles) with an HESH round.

On 27 February 1991 the British 1st Armoured Division secured the final objectives on the Basra Highway north of Multa Ridge. The British 1st Armoured Division had traveled 217 miles in 97 hours. The 1st Armoured Division had captured or destroyed about 200 tanks and a very large number of armoured personnel carriers, trucks, reconnaissance vehicles, etc.

== Significance of the battle ==
The Battle of 73 Easting and the movement to contact south of the battle brought the regiment's covering force mission for VII Corps to its conclusion. During the operation the regiment covered the advance of three different U.S. divisions in turn, moved 120 miles in eighty-two hours and fought elements of five Iraqi Divisions. The violent battle at 73 Easting fixed the southern forces of the Iraqi Republican Guard Corps and permitted the Corps Commander to launch 1st Infantry Division into the depths of the Iraqi defenses and on into Kuwait.

The 2nd ACR, which advanced between the Iraqi 12th Armored Division and the Tawakalna Division, was the only American ground unit to find itself significantly outnumbered and out-gunned. Yet, the 2nd ACR was very efficient. The 2nd Squadron, 2nd ACR alone contributed 55 Iraqi tanks destroyed, 45 other armored vehicles, an equal number of trucks, hundreds of Iraqi infantry KIA, and 865 Iraqi soldiers taken prisoner.

The Battle of 73 Easting has been recognized as the sixth largest tank battle in American history. It is considered the third largest battle of the Gulf War. It has received more recognition than any of the other Gulf War battles, mostly due to the fact it has received more media coverage due to the multiple interviews given over the years by retired Colonel Douglas Macgregor, who participated as operations officer of 2nd Squadron 2nd ACR.
