= Safwan =

Safwan, Safouan, or Safuan is a masculine given name of Arabic origin. Notable people with the name include:

== Given name ==
=== Safouane ===
- Safouane Attaf (born 1984), Moroccan judoka

=== Safuan ===
- Safuan Said (born 1982), Malaysian lawn bowler

=== Safwan ===
- Safwan Abdul-Ghani (born 1983), Iraqi footballer
- Safwan Hawsawi (born 1992), Saudi footballer
- Ṣafwān ibn Idrīs (died 1202), Andalusian traditionist and adīb
- Safwan Khalil (born 1986), Australian taekwondo athlete
- Safwan M. Masri, Jordanian professor
- Safwan Mazlan (born 2002), Malaysian footballer
- Safwan Mbaé (born 1997), French-Comorian footballer
- Safwane Mlah (born 2001), American footballer
- Safwan ibn Muattal (died 679), Arab companion of the Islamic prophet Muhammad
- Safwan al-Qudsi (1940–2022), Syrian politician
- Safwan Thabet (born 1946), Egyptian businessman
- Safwan ibn Umayya (died 661), Arab companion of the Islamic prophet Muhammad
- Safwan ibn Yahya (died 825), Arab Islamic scholar

== Surname ==
=== Safouan ===
- Moustafa Safouan (1921–2020), Egyptian psychoanalyst

=== Safwan ===
- Alif Safwan (born 2000), Malaysian footballer
- Jahm bin Safwan (696–745), Umayyad Islamic theologian

== Places ==
- Safwan, Iraq, a town in southeastern Iraq
- Safwan Hill, highest terrain feature in the region

== Institutions ==
- Safwan SC, a football club based in Safwan, Iraq

== Military engagements ==
- Battle of Safwan, campaign of Muhammad
- Safwan Airfield standoff, standoff between Iraqi and U.S. forces
