= Battle of Al Busayyah =

1991 tank battle in Iraq

Coordinates: 30°6′46″N 46°6′31″E

- Part of the Persian Gulf War
Date	26 February 1991; 35 years ago
Location	Al Busayyah, Iraq
Result	U.S. victory

Belligerents
United States	Iraq

Commanders and leaders
(United States) Gen. Schwarzkopf (United States) Gen. Frederick Franks (United States) Montgomery Meigs	(Ba'athist Iraq) Gen. Al-Rawi

Units involved
1st Armored Division: 2nd Brigade	1 infantry battalion (Republican Guard); 1 commando battalion 1 T-55 tank company

Strength
1 armored division	Unknown

Casualties and losses
None	16 captured 12 tanks destroyed 2 BRDMs destroyed 1 BMP destroyed 25 utility vehicles destroyed

The Battle of Al Busayyah was a tank battle fought in the pre-dawn darkness on February 26, 1991, during the Persian Gulf War, between armoured forces of the United States Army and those of the Iraqi Army.

The battle is named after the Iraqi town of Al Busayyah, which sat at a critical crossroads and was an Iraqi Army stronghold. The town consisted of forty to fifty buildings, most located along one main north–south road. It was defended by a battalion-sized Iraqi infantry unit reinforced by T-55 tanks, armored personnel carriers, and elements of an Iraqi commando battalion. The town was heavily fortified with machine gun nests and fighting positions. Twelve Iraqi tanks and twelve other armored fighting vehicles were dug-in deeply at strategic positions in, and around, the town. Trenchlines stretched fifteen hundred meters south of town, radiating out to perimeter strong points.

== Background ==
Charged with taking the town of Al Busayyah was the 2nd Brigade, known as the "Iron Brigade," of the 1st Armored Division (1AD), part of VII Corps, commanded by General Frederick M. Franks, Jr. The 2nd Brigade's 2-70 Armor, now TF 2-70 or Task Force 2-70, was to move north in formation and seize the town of Al Busayyah with TF 4-70 Armor on its right flank, and then with the rest of the brigade proceed to attack "Position Python", where it would strike Saddam Hussein's elite Republican Guard north of Kuwait.

== Battle ==
On the evening of the 25 February 1991 and into the early morning of the 26 February 1991, 2-1 FA pounded Iraqi targets with DPICM and HE rounds.

At dawn, 06:30am, on the 26 February 1991, the task force moved towards Phase Line Smash on the outskirts of Al Busayyah. Phase lines are map references occurring every few kilometres used to measure progress of an offensive operation. 54th Combat Eng. Bn cleared two mine fields leading to the approach to the town. At 7:40 a.m., the task force reached Phase Line Smash. In crossing the four kilometers to Al Busayyah, American mortar fire dropped smoke rounds on top of the forward Iraqi positions.

Many Iraqi soldiers surrendered almost immediately as Task Force (TF) 2-70 forces approached Al Busayyah. The TF 2-70 scout platoon laid suppressive fire on the town and Iraqis returned small arms fire from within the town but it was ineffective. The scout platoon remained to process many of the surrendering Iraqis bypassed by the task force.

Alpha Company, 4-70 Armor, commanded by Captain Phil Thieler moved, on the left flank, encountered two T-55 tanks and many other tracked vehicles, and a platoon of dismounted Iraqi soldiers. Rounds were fired from the Iraqi trenches, but as the tanks approached, the Iraqi soldiers surrendered.

Bravo Company, 6/6 Infantry sighted tanks and trucks inside the town as well as a T-62 on the outside to the north. B Company swept through, using reconnaissance by fire. In return it received some ineffectual small arms return fire and observed an Iraqi mortar round land about 150 meters from the front line of their vehicles.

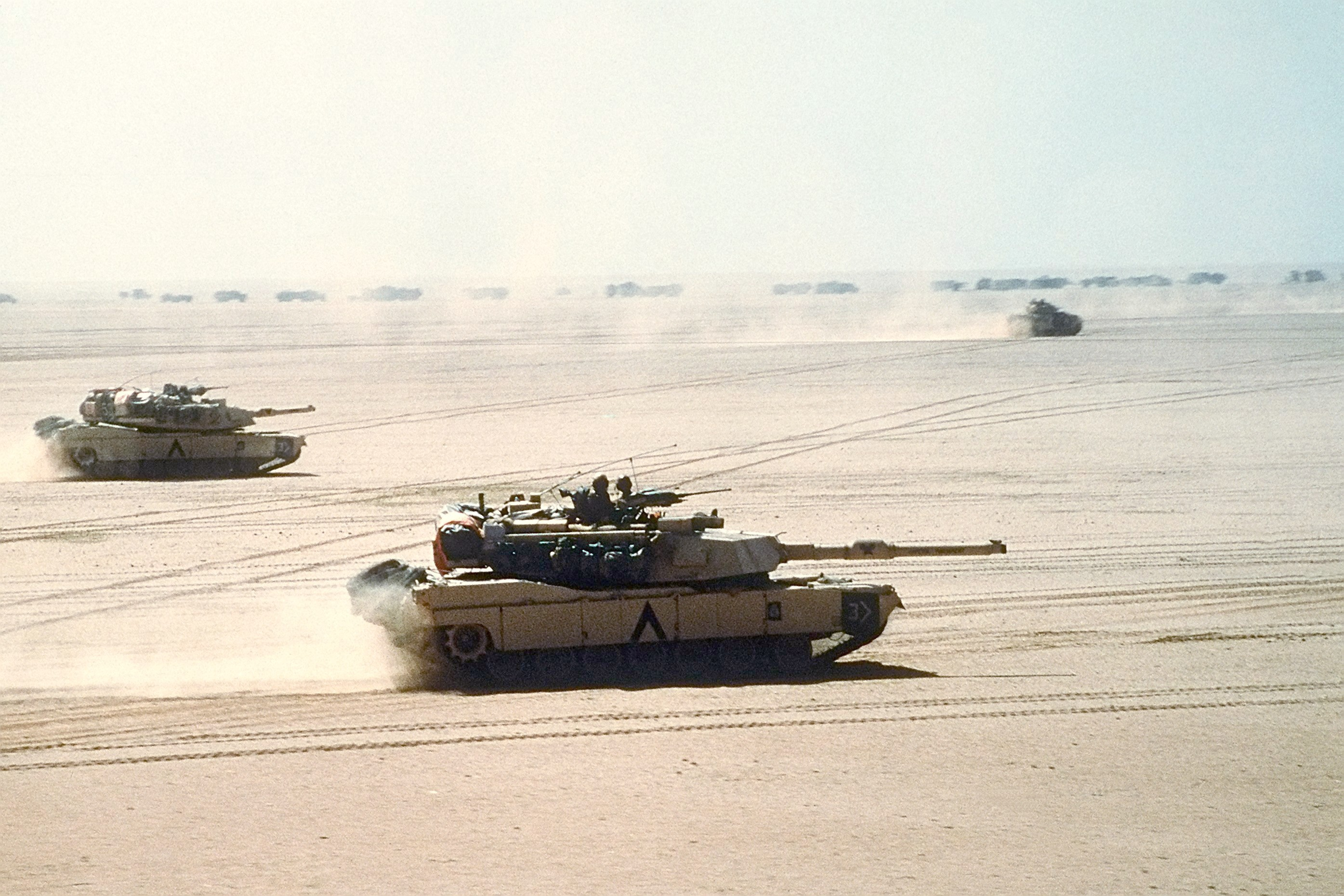
M1 Abrams move out during the Gulf War.

The rest of Task Force 4-70 Armor (the "Black Lions", commanded by Lieutenant Colonel William C. Feyk), advanced on the right flank. As they moved into their attack by fire position, TF 4-70 reported two BRDMs and several surrendering Iraqi soldiers. They did not engage the vehicles because the location of Task Force 6/6 Infantry to their right was not confirmed. Continuing their advance, they encountered and destroyed an abandoned T-55 at close range. Delayed by what appeared to be a minefield, the Bradleys struggled to catch up with the task force as they bypassed the obstacle to the left. Clearing the town to the north, Black Lions linked up with the rest of the force and reestablished contact with Fox on the right.

Charlie and Delta Companies, commanded by Captain James Goldberg and Captain Patrick Vess, moved forward, side by side. Both company commanders were told to look for five T-55's. They found the tanks at only 300 metres, as the T-55's were rising from their hide positions to engage Goldberg's and Vess' tanks. C and D companies opened fire. All of the T-55's were destroyed.

As the task force swept through the objective, brigade ordered the battalion to expeditiously move north in order to clear a kill box for an incoming M270 MLRS artillery strike on the town. Persistent resistance against 6-6 from within the town had prompted the artillery barrage. The main body was able to move quickly, but trail elements handling prisoners of war delayed the fire mission. At 08:50am the box was clear, and the artillery mission was executed. At this point the Iron Brigade continued to push northeast.

During the battle of Al Busayyah, 2-70 Armor captured 16 enemy soldiers and destroyed numerous vehicles to include 7 tanks, 2 BRDMs, 1 BMP, and 25 wheeled vehicles. 4-70 Armor destroyed five tanks and numerous other Iraqi Army vehicles.

After Al Busayyah, the brigade continued movement northeast, expecting to halt along Phase Line New Mexico. At approximately 1230 and east of Python, the task force halted to conduct refueling and resupply. Iron Brigade would go on to fight at the Battle of Medina Ridge the following day.

== In popular culture ==
- A dramatised version of the Battle of Al Busayyah is featured in an episode of the T.V. show, The X-Files, "Providence".

== See also ==
- Battle of Medina Ridge
- Iron Brigade
