= Into the Storm =

Into the Storm may refer to:

== Books ==
- Into the Storm: On the Ground in Iraq (1997), a nonfiction book by American author Tom Clancy
- Into the Storm (novel) (2008), the first book in the Destroyermen series by author Taylor Anderson

== Films ==
- Into the Storm (2009 film), a biographical film about Winston Churchill and his closing days in office at the end of World War II
- Into the Storm (2014 film), a disaster film
- Q: Into the Storm, an HBO documentary

== Music ==
- Into the Storm (opera), 1939 Soviet opera by Tikhon Khrennikov
- Into the Storm, a 2014 album by Axel Rudi Pell
- "Into the Storm", a song on the 1998 album Nightfall in Middle-Earth by German power metal band Blind Guardian
- "Into the Storm", a song on the 2007 album Land of the Free II by German power metal band Gamma Ray
- "Into the Storm", a song on the 2011 album Fly from Here by English prog band Yes
- "Into the Storm", a song on the 2021 album Fortitude by French progressive/groove metal band Gojira
