= Safwan Airfield standoff =

1991 battle between Iraqi and U.S. forces

Coordinates: 30°6′53″N 47°43′5″E

- Part of the Gulf War (aftermath)
Date	March 1, 1991
Location	Safwan Airfield, southern Iraq

Belligerents
United States	Ba'athist Iraq

Commanders and leaders
Frederick M. Franks, Jr.	Sultan Hashim Ahmad al-Tai

Casualties and losses
- None

The Safwan Airfield standoff was a post-ceasefire standoff between Iraqi and U.S. forces at the end of the 1991 Gulf War.

== Background ==
After the ground offensive, General Herbert Norman Schwarzkopf, Jr. of the coalition forces wanted a spot deep in Iraq to discuss the capitulation terms. He chose Safwan Airfield in southern Iraq on the border with Kuwait to hold a formal cease-fire ceremony, as a demonstration that the coalition was in control of the war. The airfield had been supposedly seized by VII Corps some hours earlier. However Safwan had not been taken by US troops as he had assumed. This caused General Schwarzkopf to become enraged at General Frederick M. Franks, Jr., and ordered him to take the town immediately, as he was determined to use it for the incoming talks as scheduled. The encounter between the 1st squadron, 4th Cavalry regiment (Quarterhorse) from Ft. Riley, Ks. of the U.S. 1st Infantry Division (Mechanized) and the Iraqi Republican Guard, is known in military circles as "The Ultimatum".

On the morning of March 1, 1991, M1A1 Abrams and M3A2 Bradleys from VII corps arrived at Safwan Airfield to find a group of Iraqi T-72s defending the base and the adjoining village. VII Corps gave them the option of fighting and being destroyed or vacating the place. The entire Iraqi garrison left the site at dusk, and the coalition forces quickly moved in.

Before the truce, the 1st Infantry Division had received orders to secure the road junction at Safwan. However, because of a miscommunication and a false report of friendly artillery fire, the 1st Infantry Division fell short of its target by ten miles. As result, LTC Wilson, the 1/4 Cavalry commander, scrambled his troops with orders to seize Safwan by 1600 of March 1. Meanwhile, General Franks assumed full responsibility for the mishap.

All troops of the squadron were alerted to move out at 0615 and head north. Above them, OH-58 Kiowa Warrior scout and AH-1 Cobra attack helicopters acted as guides. The lead units of the 1/4 Cavalry reached the airfield about an hour later. They were surprised when what they saw on maps as an uncompleted highway turned out to be the Safwan airfield. At first, the area seemed to be deserted, but overhead, helicopter crews reported the dug in tanks of an entire Iraqi brigade. Pope received the order not to fire unless fired upon and to continue forward. Without firing a shot, Alpha Troop occupied the airfield under the guns of the defending Iraqis. The enemy forces Pope found turned out to be a group of demoralized, starving, and ragged Iraqis. Some Americans broke out their Meals Ready to Eat (MREs) and shared them with the Iraqi defenders. Soon after they started eating, an Iraqi colonel marched up, furious that his men accepted American food and demanding that the Americans depart. Pope informed him that it was the Iraqis who would have to leave the area. He exchanged map information with the colonel and the Iraqi retreated back to his own lines to inform his superiors.

All around the perimeter, the same type of exchange was going on with different troops. With orders not to fire unless fired upon, tense moments resulted as American troops physically removed Iraqi tank crews from their vehicles. After a short period of time the Iraqi colonel returned to Pope's position and told him the Iraqis were not going to leave (although many Iraqis had already abandoned their positions). As the tension increased, a flight of AH-64 Apache attack helicopters flew over. Pope reiterated the order, shouting over the thumping of the copters’ blades that the Americans would attack if the Iraqis did not move. The Iraqi colonel went back to tell his superiors. The negotiations were not moving fast enough for MG Rhame. He ordered his 2nd Brigade, under COL Tony Moreno, to Safwan. Once there, Moreno conferred with two Iraqi generals and a civilian official. He was waiting for an Iraqi answer when Rhame radioed him with orders that were direct and to the point. He told Moreno, “Tell the Iraqis to move or die.” When Moreno met the Iraqis for a second time, he cut off their reading of a prepared statement. Spitting a wad of blood at their feet (he had recently cut his lip) he said, “If you don’t leave by 16:00 hours, we will kill you.” That ended the negotiations. The Iraqis pulled out.

A few days later, the Iraqis and Americans met at the airfield to sign the terms of capitulation of the Iraqi forces.
