= Safwan Air Base =

Safwan Air Base
- صفوان
- Near Safwan, Basra Governorate in Iraq

Site information
- Type: Air Base
- Owner: Ministry of Defence
- Operator: Iraqi Air Force
- Controlled by: Coalition forces (2003)
- Open to the public: No
- Condition: Abandoned

Location
- Shown within Iraq
- Coordinates: 30°08′03″N 047°39′01″E

Site history
- In use: 2003 (ceased operations)
- Fate: Abandoned
- Battles/wars: Safwan Airfield Standoff, Operation Iraqi Freedom
- Events: Ceasefire negotiations (1991), U.S. capture (2003)

Safwan Air Base is a former Iraqi Air Force base in the Basra Governorate of Iraq. It was captured by Coalition forces during Operation Iraqi Freedom in 2003.

== Overview ==
The facility was an auxiliary airfield, consisting of a 10,000-foot runway and a small aircraft parking ramp. In March 1991 it was the location of the Safwan Airfield Standoff and signing of the ceasefire which suspended Operation Desert Storm.

It was apparently abandoned after the ceasefire and was later seized by U.S. ground forces during the 2003 invasion of Iraq. Today the airfield is abandoned in some desert/agricultural fields; the long runway has numerous tire markings on it, probably being used for touch-and-go landings but otherwise unused.

Safwan is located in the south of Iraq at the Iraqi-Kuwaiti border, along the infamous Highway of Death from the Persian Gulf War. The ceasefire negotiations between General Norman Schwarzkopf and the Iraqi delegation, led by Lieutenant General Sultan Hashim Ahmad, took place at Safwan airfield.

Schwarzkopf's demand to hold the formal ceasefire negotiations in Iraqi territory led to the encounter between the 1st Squadron, 4th Cavalry Regiment (Quarterhorse) from Ft. Riley, Kansas, of the U.S. 1st Infantry Division (Mechanized) and the Iraqi Republican Guard, known in military circles as The Ultimatum. This was detailed in the book Third Graders at War, as well as the book Road to Safwan.
