= Dereliction of Duty (book) =

1997 book by H. R. McMaster

Dereliction of Duty: Lyndon Johnson, Robert McNamara, the Joint Chiefs of Staff, and the Lies That Led to Vietnam
- Author: H. R. McMaster
- Language: English
- Subject: Vietnam War
- Publisher: Harper Perennial
- Publication date: September 2, 1997
- Publication place: United States
- Media type: Print (Hardcover)
- Pages: 352
- ISBN: 0060187956
- OCLC: 778975095

Dereliction of Duty: Lyndon Johnson, Robert McNamara, the Joint Chiefs of Staff, and the Lies That Led to Vietnam is a 1997 book written by H. R. McMaster, at the time of publication a major in the United States Army (he subsequently became National Security Advisor in 2017 after having risen in rank to lieutenant general). The book presents a case indicting former U.S. President Lyndon B. Johnson and his principal civilian and military advisers for losing the Vietnam War. The book was based on McMaster's Ph.D. dissertation at University of North Carolina at Chapel Hill.

== Author ==
Herbert Raymond McMaster, a United States Military Academy graduate and University of North Carolina Ph.D. who was an armored cavalry commander in the Persian Gulf War, authored the book over the course of five years of research and writing. McMaster claims that his principal motivations for authoring Dereliction of Duty came from his experience reading the accounts of Vietnam War soldiers while studying as a West Point cadet and his experience as a field commander in Operation Desert Storm.

McMaster would later rise to the rank of lieutenant general and serve in the Iraq War and the War in Afghanistan before being appointed to the position of National Security Adviser by President Donald Trump in February 2017.

== Blame for leaders ==
McMaster blamed leaders in Washington for losing the Vietnam War, writing:

The war in Vietnam was not lost in the field, nor was it lost on the front pages of The New York Times, or on the college campuses. It was lost in Washington, D.C., even before Americans assumed sole responsibility for the fighting in 1965 and before they realized the country was at war. ... [It was] a uniquely human failure, the responsibility for which was shared by President Johnson and his principal military and civilian advisors.

== Other themes ==
The book examines the failure of Robert McNamara and U.S. President Lyndon B. Johnson's staff, alongside the military and particularly the Joint Chiefs of Staff, to provide a successful plan of action to pacify a Viet Cong insurgency or decisively defeat the North Vietnamese Army. McMaster details why military actions intended to indicate "resolve" or to "communicate" ultimately failed when trying to accomplish sparsely detailed, confusing, and conflicting military objectives. In his opinion, the military is to be used appropriately in order to meet objective military targets and goals.

== Reviews ==
Unusual for an active-duty officer, McMaster scolded the U.S. government for its "arrogance, weakness, lying in pursuit of self-interest [and] abdication of responsibility to the American people."

Retired Brigadier General Douglas Kinnard said that the book is built around examining and interpreting four key Washington decisions that were of major influence on the American involvement in Indochina:

1. the August 1964 Gulf of Tonkin Resolution
2. the February 1965 decision to conduct air strikes against North Vietnam
3. the March 1965 decision to introduce American ground troops into South Vietnam
4. the July 1965 decisions to introduce substantial American forces while not mobilizing reserve forces

A review in The New York Times by military historian Ronald H. Spector praised many aspects of the book, but criticized the author's emphasis on the shortcomings of the Joint Chiefs of Staff in the outcome of the war, as opposed to the strengths of North Vietnamese military strategy and tactics. Spector also notes that McMaster, like earlier authors, presented a picture of Lyndon B. Johnson as a President chiefly concerned about keeping Vietnam from becoming a political issue, and with his portrayal of Johnson's advisers as men possessing a distinctive combination of arrogance, deviousness and disdain for expertise different from their own.

== Influence ==
In a CNN report on Iraq in October 2006, the influence of the book in military circles is noted:

General Pace said he and the other Joint Chiefs were debriefing commanders just back from the front lines, including one colonel recognized as a rising star and creative thinker—Col H.R. McMaster, the author of 1997 book Dereliction of Duty, considered the seminal work on military's responsibility during Vietnam to confront their civilian bosses when strategy was not working.
