= H. R. McMaster =

United States Army general (born 1962)

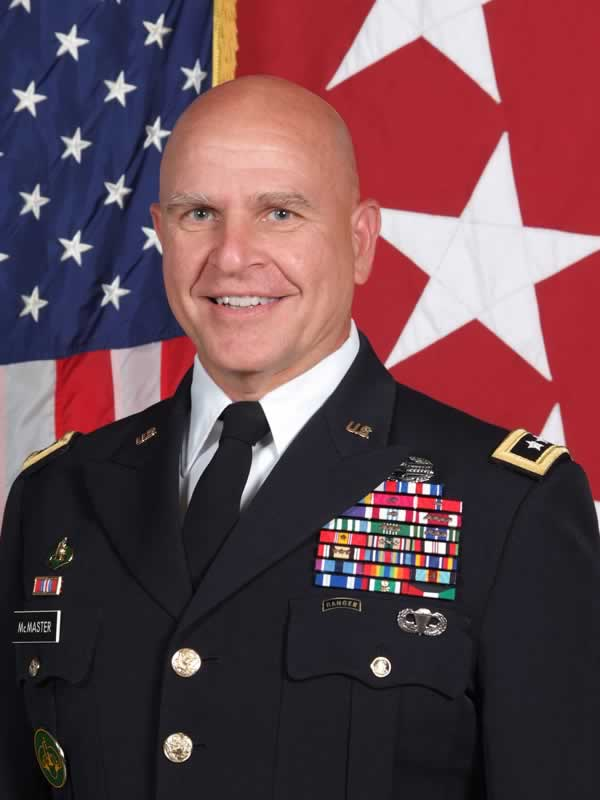
- Official portrait, 2014

25th United States National Security Advisor
- In office February 20, 2017 – April 9, 2018
- President: Donald Trump
- Deputy: K. T. McFarland; Dina Powell; Ricky Waddell
- Preceded by: Michael Flynn
- Succeeded by: John Bolton

Personal details
- Born: Herbert Raymond McMaster; July 24, 1962 (age 64) Philadelphia, Pennsylvania, U.S.
- Spouse: Kathleen Trotter (m. 1985)
- Children: 3
- Education: United States Military Academy (BS); University of North Carolina, Chapel Hill (MA, PhD)
- Nickname: "The Iconoclast General"

Military service
- Allegiance: United States
- Branch/service: United States Army
- Years of service: 1984–2018
- Rank: Lieutenant General
- Commands: Eagle Troop, 2nd Armored Cavalry Regiment; 1st Squadron, 4th Cavalry Regiment; 3rd Armored Cavalry Regiment; Concept Development and Experimentation Directorate, Army Capabilities Integration Center; Joint Anti-Corruption Task Force (Shafafiyat), International Security Assistance Force; Maneuver Center of Excellence
- Battles/wars: Gulf War; Battle of 73 Easting; Global War on Terrorism; Iraq War; War in Afghanistan
- Awards: Army Distinguished Service Medal (3); Silver Star; Defense Superior Service Medal; Legion of Merit (2); Bronze Star (2); Purple Heart; Defense Meritorious Service Medal (2); Army Meritorious Service Medal (5); Joint Service Commendation Medal; Army Commendation Medal (4); Army Achievement Medal (4)

Herbert Raymond McMaster (born July 24, 1962) is a retired United States Army lieutenant general who served as the 25th United States National Security Advisor from 2017 to 2018. He is also known for his roles in the Gulf War, Operation Enduring Freedom, and Operation Iraqi Freedom.

Born in Philadelphia, McMaster graduated from the United States Military Academy in 1984 and earned a Ph.D. in American history from the University of North Carolina at Chapel Hill in 1996. His dissertation was critical of American strategy and military leadership during the Vietnam War and served as the basis for his book Dereliction of Duty, which was a NYT Bestseller and is widely read in the United States military. During the Gulf War, then Captain McMaster commanded Eagle Troop, 2nd Cavalry Regiment in the Battle of 73 Easting.

After the Gulf War, McMaster attended graduate school at UNC Chapel Hill then taught military history at the United States Military Academy from 1994 to 1996. After serving as a squadron executive officer and a regimental operations officer in the 11th Cavalry Regiment at Fort Irwin, California, he commanded the 1st Squadron 4th Cavalry at Schweinfurt, Germany from 1999 to 2002. After an Army War College Fellowship at the Hoover Institution, Stanford University, he served as an executive officer and director of the Commander's Advisory Group at United States Central Command forward headquarters command in Qatar. In 2004, he took command of the 3rd Cavalry Regiment and fought the Iraqi insurgency in South Baghdad and Tal Afar from 2005 to 2006 after which he became a top counterinsurgency advisor to General David Petraeus in Baghdad from 2007 to 2008. Brigadier General McMaster was the Director of Concept Development and Learning at the U.S. Army Training and Doctrine Command (TRADOC) from 2008 to 2010. From 2010 to 2012, he commanded Task Force Shafafiyat (Transparency), International Security Assistance Force in Afghanistan. Major General McMaster commanded Fort Benning, Georgia and the Maneuver Center of Excellence from 2012 to 2014. In 2014, Lieutenant General McMaster became Director of the Army Capabilities Integration Center and Deputy Commanding General (Futures) at TRADOC.

In February 2017, McMaster succeeded Michael Flynn as President Donald Trump's National Security Advisor. He remained on active duty as a lieutenant general while serving as National Security Advisor, and retired in May 2018. McMaster resigned as National Security Advisor on March 22, 2018, effective April 9, and accepted an academic appointment at the Hoover Institution, Stanford University, in 2018.

McMaster is the Fouad and Michelle Ajami Senior Fellow at the Hoover Institution, the Bernard and Susan Liautaud Visiting Fellow at the Freeman Spogli Institute for International Studies, a lecturer in management at the Stanford Graduate School of Business., serves as the chairman of the Board of Advisors at the Center on Military and Political Power at the Foundation for Defense of Democracies, and a distinguished visiting fellow at Arizona State University.

McMaster is also the host of Battlegrounds With H.R. McMaster, a platform for leaders from key countries to share their assessment of problem sets and opportunities that have implications for U.S. foreign policy and national security strategy.

== Early life ==
H.R. McMaster was born in Philadelphia on July 24, 1962. His father, Herbert McMaster Sr., was a veteran of the Korean War who retired from the Army as a lieutenant colonel. His mother, Marie C. "Mimi" McMaster (née Curcio), was a school teacher and administrator. He has a younger sister, Letitia. He attended Norwood Fontbonne Academy, graduating in 1976; and high school at Valley Forge Military Academy, graduating in 1980. He earned a commission as a second lieutenant upon graduating from the United States Military Academy at West Point in 1984.

McMaster earned a Master of Arts and Ph.D. in American history from the University of North Carolina at Chapel Hill (UNC). His thesis was critical of American strategy in the Vietnam War, which was further detailed in his NYT bestselling book Dereliction of Duty (1997). The book details how and why the Vietnam War became an American war. It harshly criticized high-ranking officers of the era, arguing that they inadequately challenged Secretary of Defense Robert McNamara and President Lyndon B. Johnson on their Vietnam strategy. The book examines McNamara and Johnson's staff alongside the Joint Chiefs of Staff and other high-ranking military officers, and their failure to provide a successful plan of action either to pacify a Viet Cong insurgency or to decisively defeat the North Vietnamese Army. McMaster also details why military actions intended to indicate "resolve" or to "communicate" ultimately failed when trying to accomplish ambiguous, confusing, and conflicting military objectives. The book was reportedly much read in Pentagon circles and included in military reading lists.

== Military career ==
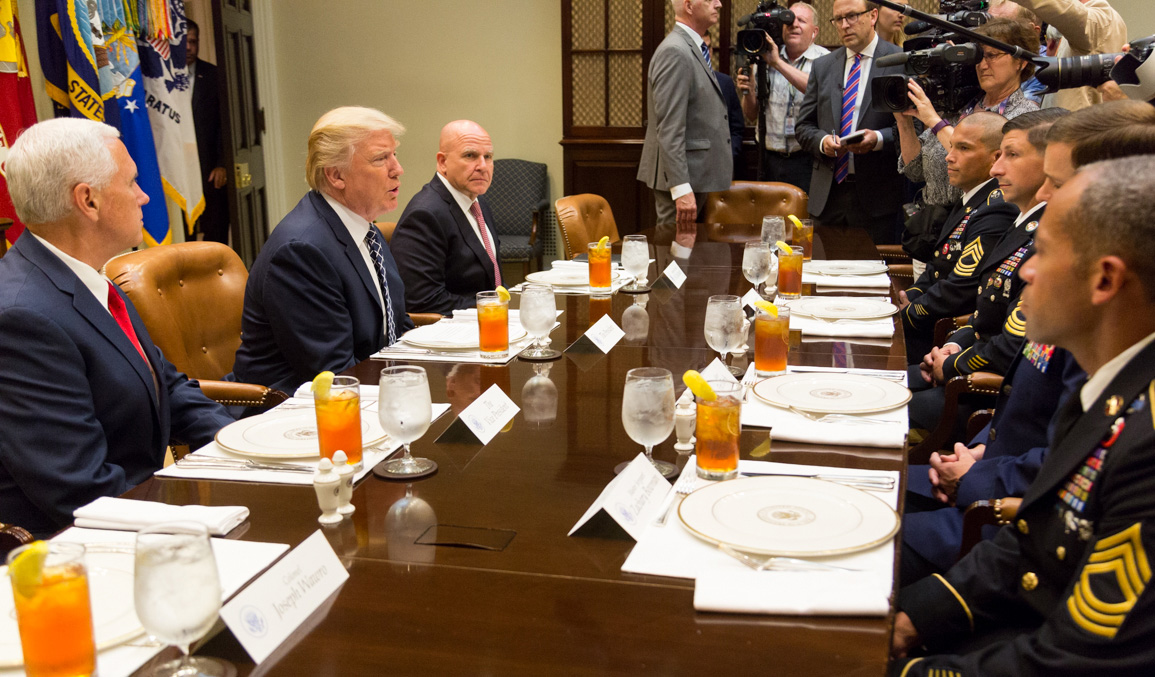
President Donald Trump, Vice President Mike Pence, and National Security Advisor Lt. Gen. H. R. McMaster have lunch with service members on July 18, 2017.

McMaster's first assignment after commissioning was to the 2nd Armored Division at Fort Hood, where he served in a variety of platoon and company-level leadership assignments with 1st Battalion 66th Armor Regiment. In 1989, he was assigned to the 2nd Armored Cavalry Regiment at Warner Barracks in Bamberg, Germany, where he served until 1992, including deployment to Operation Desert Storm.

During the Gulf War in 1991 McMaster was a captain commanding Eagle Troop of the 2nd Armored Cavalry Regiment at the Battle of 73 Easting. During that battle, though significantly outnumbered and encountering the enemy by surprise as McMaster's lead tank crested a dip in the terrain, the nine tanks of his troop destroyed 28 Iraqi Republican Guard tanks without loss in 23 minutes.

McMaster was awarded the Silver Star. The now famous battle is featured in several books about Operation Desert Storm and is widely referred to in US Army training exercises. It was also discussed in Tom Clancy's 1994 popular nonfiction book Armored Cav.

McMaster served as a military history professor at West Point from 1994 to 1996, teaching among other things the battles in which he fought. He graduated from the United States Army Command and General Staff College in 1999.

McMaster commanded 1st Squadron, 4th Cavalry Regiment, from 1999 to 2002, and then took a series of staff positions at U.S. Central Command (USCENTCOM), including planning and operations roles in Iraq.

In his next job, as lieutenant colonel and later colonel, McMaster worked on the staff of USCENTCOM as executive officer to Deputy Commander Lieutenant General John Abizaid. When Abizaid received four-star rank and became Central Command's head, McMaster served as Director, Commander's Advisory Group (CAG), described as the command's brain trust.

In 2003 McMaster completed an Army War College research fellowship at Stanford University's Hoover Institution. In 2004, he was assigned to command the 3rd Armored Cavalry Regiment (3rd ACR). Shortly after McMaster took command the regiment deployed for its second tour in Iraq and was assigned the mission of securing the city of Tal Afar. That mission culminated in September with Operation Restoring Rights and the defeat of the city's insurgent strongholds. President George W. Bush praised this success, and the PBS show Frontline broadcast a documentary in February 2006 featuring interviews with McMaster. CBS's 60 Minutes produced a similar segment in July, and the operation was the subject of an article in the April 10, 2006, issue of The New Yorker.

Author Tim Harford has written that the pioneering tactics employed by 3rd ACR led to the first success in overcoming the Iraqi insurgency. Before 2005, tactics included staying out of dangerous urban areas except on patrols, with US forces returning to their bases each night. These patrols had little success in turning back the insurgency because local Iraqis who feared retaliation would very rarely assist in identifying them to US forces. McMaster deployed his soldiers into Tal Afar on a permanent basis, and once the local population grew confident that they weren't going to withdraw nightly, the citizens began providing information on the insurgents, enabling US forces to target and defeat them. After hearing of McMaster's counterinsurgency success in Tal Afar, Vice President Dick Cheney invited McMaster to personally brief him on the situation in Iraq and give an assessment on what changes needed to be made to American strategy.

McMaster passed command of the 3rd ACR on June 29, 2006, and joined the International Institute for Strategic Studies in London, as a Senior Research Associate tasked to "conduct research to identify opportunities for improved multi-national cooperation and political-military integration in the areas of counterinsurgency, counter-terrorism, and state building", and to devise "better tactics to battle terrorism."

From August 2007 to August 2008, McMaster was part of an "elite team of officers advising U.S. commander" General David Petraeus on counterinsurgency operations while Petraeus directed revision of the Army's Counterinsurgency Field Manual during his command of the Combined Arms Center. Petraeus and most of his team were stationed in Fort Leavenworth at the time but McMaster collaborated remotely, according to senior team member John Nagl.

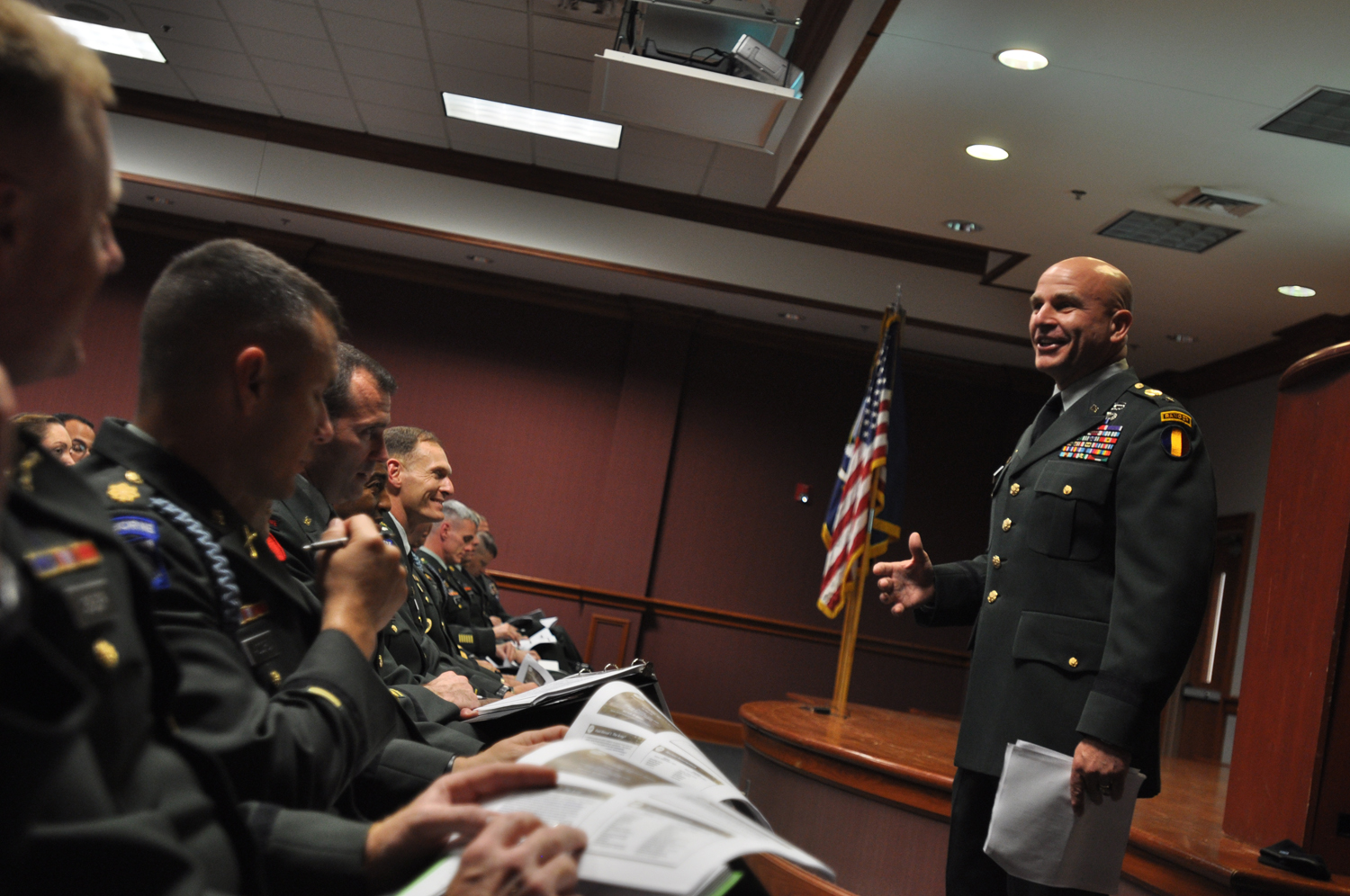
McMaster as BCT guest lecturer in September 2009

Based on his date of rank as a colonel, McMaster was considered for promotion to brigadier general by annual Department of the Army selection boards in 2006 and 2007 but was not selected, despite his reputation as one of "the most celebrated soldiers of the Iraq War." Though the Army's rationale for whether a given officer is selected is not made public, McMaster's initial non-selection attracted considerable media attention. In late 2007, Secretary of the Army Pete Geren requested that Petraeus return from Iraq to take charge of the promotion board as a way to ensure that the best performers in combat received every consideration for advancement, resulting in McMaster's selection along with other colonels who had been identified as innovative thinkers.

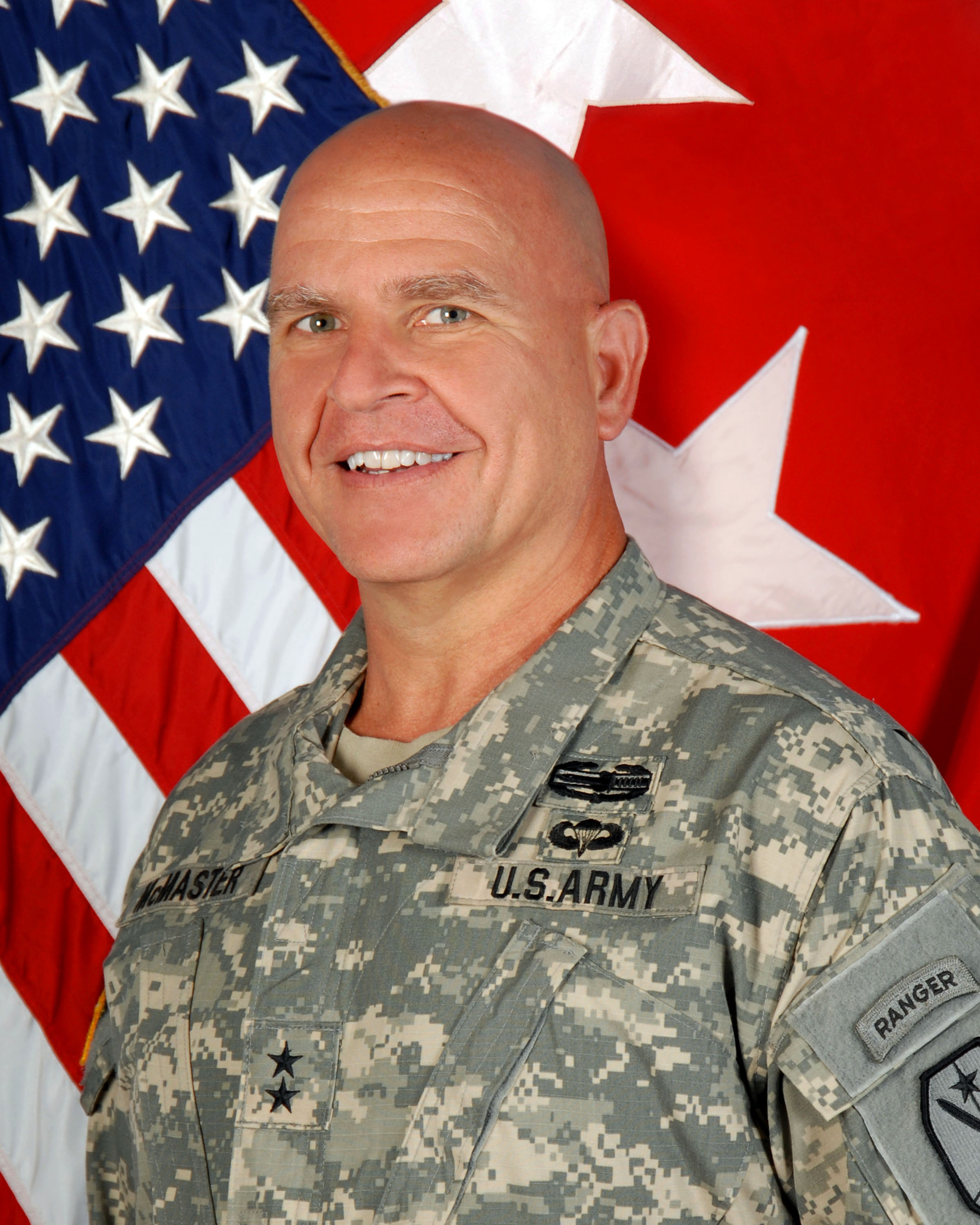
McMaster as commander of the Maneuver Center of Excellence in 2012

In August 2008, McMaster assumed duties as Director, Concept Development and Experimentation (later renamed Concept Development and Learning), in the Army Capabilities Integration Center (ARCIC) at Fort Monroe, Virginia, part of U.S. Army Training and Doctrine Command. In this position he was involved in preparing doctrine to guide the Army over the next 10 to 20 years. He was promoted on June 29, 2009. Of the 978 members of the West Point Class of 1984 commissioned into the U.S. Army, McMaster was the second promoted to General Officer. In July 2010 he was selected to be the J-5, Deputy to the Commander for Planning, at ISAF (International Security Assistance Forces) Headquarters in Kabul, Afghanistan.

McMaster was nominated for major general on January 23, 2012, and selected to be the commander of the Army's Maneuver Center of Excellence at Fort Benning. In February 2014, Defense Secretary Chuck Hagel nominated McMaster for lieutenant general.

In July 2014, McMaster pinned on his third star when he began his duties as Deputy Commanding General of the U.S. Army Training and Doctrine Command and Director of TRADOC's ARCIC. He would spend three years at that position before he moved into the political realm.

Army Chief of Staff General Martin Dempsey remarked in 2011 that McMaster was "probably our best Brigadier General." McMaster made Time's list of the 100 most influential people in the world in April 2014. He was hailed as "the architect of the future U.S. Army" in the accompanying piece written by retired Lt. Gen. David Barno, who commanded U.S. and allied forces in Afghanistan from 2003 to 2005. "Major General Herbert Raymond McMaster might be the 21st century Army's pre-eminent warrior-thinker," Barno wrote, commenting on McMaster's "impressive command and unconventional exploits in the second Iraq war." Barno also wrote, "Recently tapped for his third star, H. R. is also the rarest of soldiers—one who has repeatedly bucked the system and survived to join its senior ranks."

McMaster requested his retirement from the Army following his March 22, 2018, resignation as President Trump's National Security Adviser, asking that he leave the service "this summer."

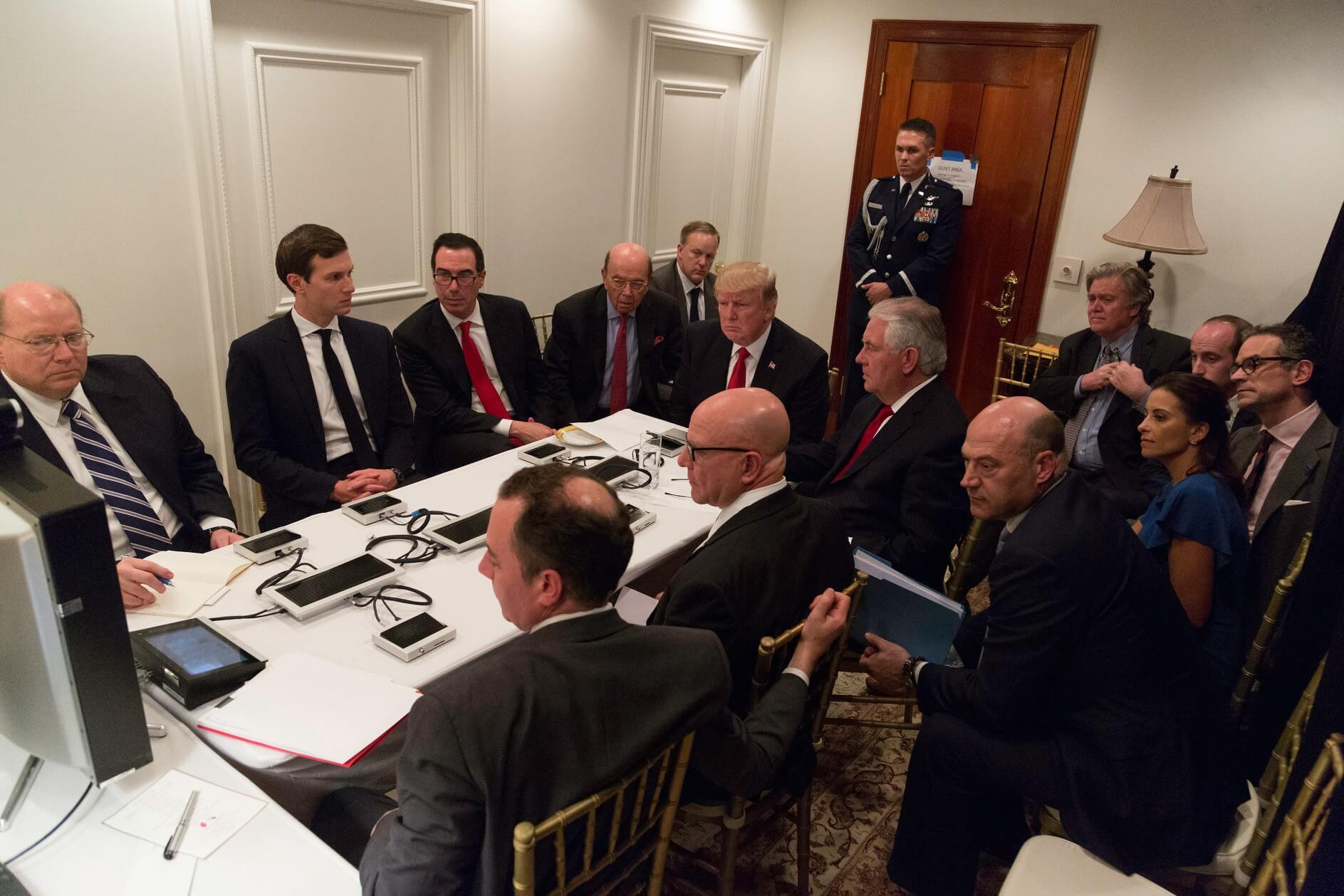
McMaster during the April 2017 Syrian missile strike operation

== National Security Advisor ==
On February 20, 2017, U.S. President Donald Trump nominated McMaster for National Security Advisor following the resignation of Michael T. Flynn on February 13. Trump asked McMaster to remain on active duty while he served as national security advisor.

Because McMaster intended to remain on active duty, his official assumption of the National Security Advisor's duties and responsibilities required a United States Senate vote; lieutenant generals and generals require Senate confirmation of their rank and assignments. On March 6, 2017, the Senate Armed Services Committee voted 23–2 to recommend to the full Senate that McMaster be confirmed for reappointment at his lieutenant general rank during his service as the National Security Advisor. The committee recommendation was referred to the Senate on March 7, and the full Senate confirmed McMaster by a vote of 86–10 on March 15, 2017.

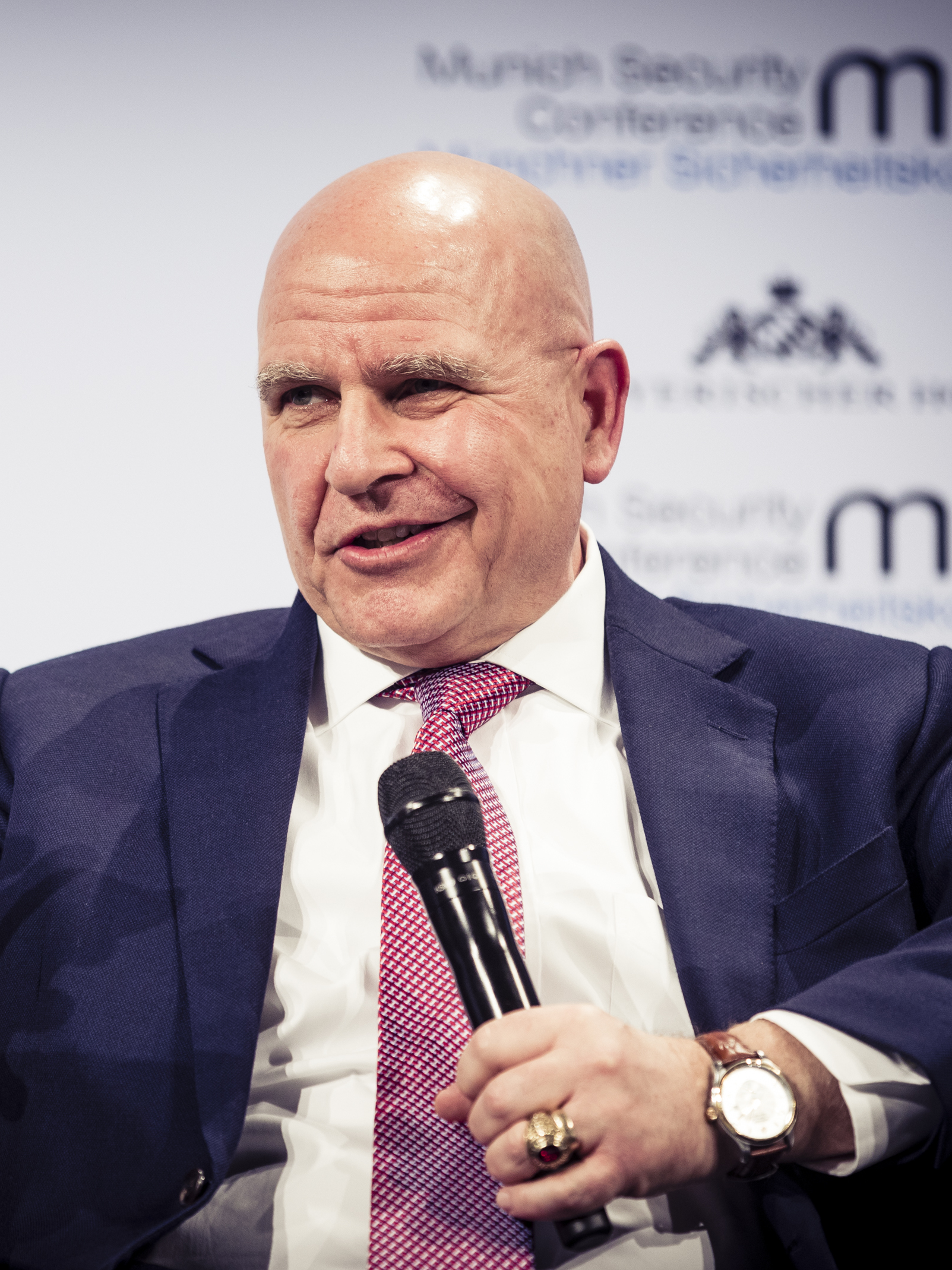
McMaster during the 2018 Munich Security Conference

In early August, McMaster was targeted by what some deemed a "smear campaign" after he fired several National Security Council staff members. White House officials and journalists suspected Steve Bannon of leading these attacks. Attorney Mike Cernovich, radio host Alex Jones and Breitbart News were among the foremost promoters of the anti-McMaster campaign; Cernovich's website for the campaign also included a cartoon depicting McMaster, which the Anti-Defamation League (ADL) labeled antisemitic. In addition, the Center for Security Policy criticized McMaster for being insufficiently conservative and for not supporting Trump's agenda. The Russian intelligence services used internet bots and trolls to campaign to get McMaster out. The anti-McMaster campaign prompted dismissive responses by administration officials, and a statement from Trump affirming his confidence in McMaster.

In February 2018, McMaster said that it was "incontrovertible" that Russia interfered in the 2016 presidential election. McMaster, who spoke a day after a federal grand jury indicted more than a dozen Russians in connection with the interference, was addressing an international audience at the Munich Security Conference, including several Russian officials.

=== Dismissal and retirement ===
On March 15, 2018, it was reported that Trump had decided to dismiss McMaster from his position at a later, unspecified date. White House Press Secretary Sarah Huckabee Sanders denied the reports in a tweet, claiming nothing had changed at the National Security Council.

On March 22, 2018, McMaster resigned as National Security Advisor. He said in a statement that he planned to retire from the military sometime in the next few months. Army Chief of Staff Mark Milley asked McMaster to compete for four-star positions, but McMaster had decided to retire from the Army after leaving the job as National Security Advisor. Trump announced John Bolton, former U.S. Ambassador to the United Nations, as McMaster's replacement. McMaster's ousting closely followed the departures of several other high-ranking officials in the administration, including Trump's longtime assistant and communications director Hope Hicks, national economic advisor Gary Cohn, and Secretary of State Rex Tillerson. Trump first announced McMaster's departure from the administration via a public tweet which thanked McMaster and stated that McMaster would "always be my friend."

McMaster's retirement ceremony was held on May 18, 2018. It took place at Joint Base Myer–Henderson Hall, and was presided over by General Mark A. Milley, the Army Chief of Staff. Among the decorations and honors McMaster received was a third award of the Army Distinguished Service Medal.

== Post-military career ==
In September 2018, McMaster began work as a Bernard and Susan Liautaud Visiting Fellow at Stanford University's Freeman Spogli Institute for International Studies. He was appointed to the Fouad and Michelle Ajami Senior Fellowship at Stanford's Hoover Institution and serves as a lecturer in strategy at Stanford Graduate School of Business effective September 1, 2018, as that institution had announced on July 2 that year.

In 2019, McMaster became an Advisory Board Member of Spirit of America, a 501(c)(3) organization that supports deployed US personnel. In 2020, McMaster became a board member of Zoom Video Communications, and advisor to Mischler Financial Group Inc. He is Chairman of Ergo's Flashpoints Forum, a consultancy firm. In 2021, McMaster joined the National Security Advisory Board of venture capital firm, Shield Capital, as Senior Advisor. In September 2021, McMaster joined the advisory board of the geospatial-intelligence corporation Edgybees. In January 2022, he joined the advisory board of Strider Technologies, a software firm focused on economic statecraft risk vis-à-vis strategic competition with China.

In 2021 McMaster was appointed Distinguished University Fellow at Arizona State University where he serves as a subject matter expert on national security and defense issues. Also serving as an Arizona State University guest lecturer, he guides and mentors students, and hosts special events surrounding national security and defense to advance Arizona State University's lead in competitive statecraft.

In September 2021 McMaster was removed from the United States Military Academy's Board of Visitors by President Joe Biden as part of a mass removal of 18 Trump appointees on the boards of the three service branches. White House press secretary Jen Psaki said that the Biden administration "was seeking to ensure that board members were 'qualified to serve' and aligned with the president's values."

=== Books ===
HarperCollins published McMaster's memoir of his time working as National Security Advisor in the Trump White House, At War with Ourselves – My Tour of Duty in the Trump White House in late August 2024. He was interviewed by Anderson Cooper at length especially about the history of Trump's decision to settle a deal with the Taliban and exclude the government of the Islamic Republic of Afghanistan from the negotiations.

HarperCollins published McMaster's second NYT bestselling book, Battlegrounds: The Fight to Defend the Free World in September 2020. The book is structured in seven parts, each concerning an area of interest for foreign policy, with autobiographical details strewn throughout. The areas are Russia, China, South Asia, the Middle East, Iran and North Korea. The final part is about "Arenas", which concludes his vision of foreign policy for the United States.

Positive reviews of the book included one by Cliff May, founder and president of Foundation for Defense of Democracies (FDD), who said of the book "... with H. R.'s thoughtful, substantive, and intellectual approach. Battlegrounds lives up to this expectation, and then some. As a historian, as well as a soldier and strategist, General McMaster explores the development of the complex challenges facing America in the 21st Century." Another positive review was that of Steve Cohen, an attorney at Pollock Cohen LLP in New York and a former member of the U.S. Naval Institute Board of Directors, who said it was "... a sober, thoughtful, intelligent volume that deserves shelf space for anyone serious about U.S. foreign policy in the first part of the 21st century."

McMaster is the author of Dereliction of Duty: Lyndon Johnson, Robert McNamara, the Joint Chiefs of Staff and the Lies that Led to Vietnam and has co-authored several other books on foreign policy. In 2024, he published At War with Ourselves: My Tour of Duty in the Trump White House about his time as Trump's National Security Advisor, portraying Trump as unfit for office and a vain and insecure leader who was susceptible to flattery and to being taken advantage of by foreign leaders such as China's Xi Jinping, Russia's Vladimir Putin, and Turkey's Recep Tayyip Erdoğan.

=== Podcast ===
McMaster hosts the video and podcast series Today's Battlegrounds where he brings together international perspectives on crucial challenges to security and prosperity. And he is featured on GoodFellows Podcast which hosts conversations on economics, history, & geopolitics, it is a videocast from the Hoover Institution with senior fellows John Cochrane, Niall Ferguson, along with H.R. McMaster.

=== Speaking events ===
McMaster has been a speaker at different speaking events across the country. McMaster was a speaker for the 2023 Waldo Family Lecture on International Relations and the 2026 Craig W. Barton Speaker Series. The event was hosted at the Miller Concert Hall which is located on the Wichita State University main campus.

== Decorations and badges ==
U.S. military decorations
Army Distinguished Service Medal with two Oak leaf clusters
Silver Star
Defense Superior Service Medal
Legion of Merit with Oak leaf cluster
Bronze Star Medal with Oak leaf cluster
Purple Heart
Defense Meritorious Service Medal with Oak leaf cluster
Meritorious Service Medal with four Oak leaf clusters
Joint Service Commendation Medal
Army Commendation Medal with three Oak leaf clusters
Army Achievement Medal with three Oak leaf clusters
Valorous Unit Award
U.S. service (campaign) medals and service and training ribbons
National Defense Service Medal with one service star
Southwest Asia Service Medal with three service stars
Afghanistan Campaign Medal
Iraq Campaign Medal with three service stars
Global War on Terrorism Expeditionary Medal
Global War on Terrorism Service Medal
Humanitarian Service Medal
Army Service Ribbon
Army Overseas Service Ribbon with bronze award numeral 4
Foreign decorations
NATO Medal
Kuwait Liberation Medal (Saudi Arabia)
Kuwait Liberation Medal (Kuwait)
Chevalier, French Legion of Honour

U.S. badges, patches and tabs
Combat Action Badge
Basic Parachutist Badge
Ranger tab
3rd Armored Cavalry Regiment Distinctive Unit Insignia
3rd Armored Cavalry Regiment Combat Service Identification Badge
10 Overseas Service Bars
U.S. orders
Order of the Spur Cavalry Hat and Spurs (Gold)

== See also ==
Political offices
Preceded by Michael Flynn	National Security Advisor; 2017–2018	Succeeded by John Bolton
