= Douglas Macgregor =

U.S. Army colonel and government official (born 1953)

- Macgregor in 2026

Senior Advisor to the United States Secretary of Defense
- In office November 11, 2020 – January 20, 2021
- President: Donald Trump
- Secretary: Chris Miller (acting)
- Preceded by: Position established
- Succeeded by: Position abolished

Personal details
- Born: Douglas Abbott Macgregor; January 4, 1953 (age 73) Philadelphia, Pennsylvania, U.S.
- Education: United States Military Academy (BS); University of Virginia (MA, PhD)
- Occupation: military officer; television personality

Military service
- Allegiance: United States
- Branch/service: United States Army
- Years of service: 1976–2004
- Rank: Colonel
- Commands: 1st Squadron, 4th Cavalry
- Battles/wars: Gulf War; Battle of 73 Easting; Kosovo War
- Awards: Defense Superior Service Medal; Bronze Star (with Valor); Meritorious Service Medal (4); Army Commendation Medal; Army Achievement Medal; National Defense Service Medal (2); Southwest Asia Service Medal (2 Bronze Stars); Kuwait Liberation Medal; Kosovo Campaign Medal; Humanitarian Service Medal; French Meritorious Service Medal (Bronze Star); Parachutist Badge; Ranger Tab

Douglas Abbott Macgregor (born January 4, 1953) is an American author, consultant, political commentator, former government official, and retired colonel in the United States Army.

An Armor Branch officer by background, Macgregor was a leader in an early tank battle in the Gulf War and was a top planner in the 1999 NATO bombing of Yugoslavia. His 1997 book Breaking the Phalanx argued for radical reforms inside the United States Army.

After retiring from the military in 2004, Macgregor became more politically active. In 2020, president Donald Trump proposed him as the U.S. ambassador to Germany, but the U.S. Senate blocked the nomination. On November 11, 2020, a Pentagon spokesperson announced that Macgregor had been hired to serve as senior advisor to the acting secretary of defense, a post he held for less than three months. Trump also appointed him to the board of the U.S. Military Academy, but the appointment was terminated by president Joe Biden in 2021. Macgregor's commentary has been noted for placing a lower significance on Ukraine, illegal immigrants and refugees than competing priorities in terms of overall U.S. foreign relations considerations.

== Early life and education ==
Douglas Abbott Macgregor was born on January 4, 1947, in Philadelphia, Pennsylvania. He was educated at the William Penn Charter School in Philadelphia, the Virginia Military Institute, and the United States Military Academy at West Point, New York. He graduated from West Point with a Bachelor of Science degree in general engineering in 1976. Macgregor received his Master of Arts and Doctor of Philosophy degrees in international relations from the University of Virginia in 1985 and 1987, respectively.

== Military career ==
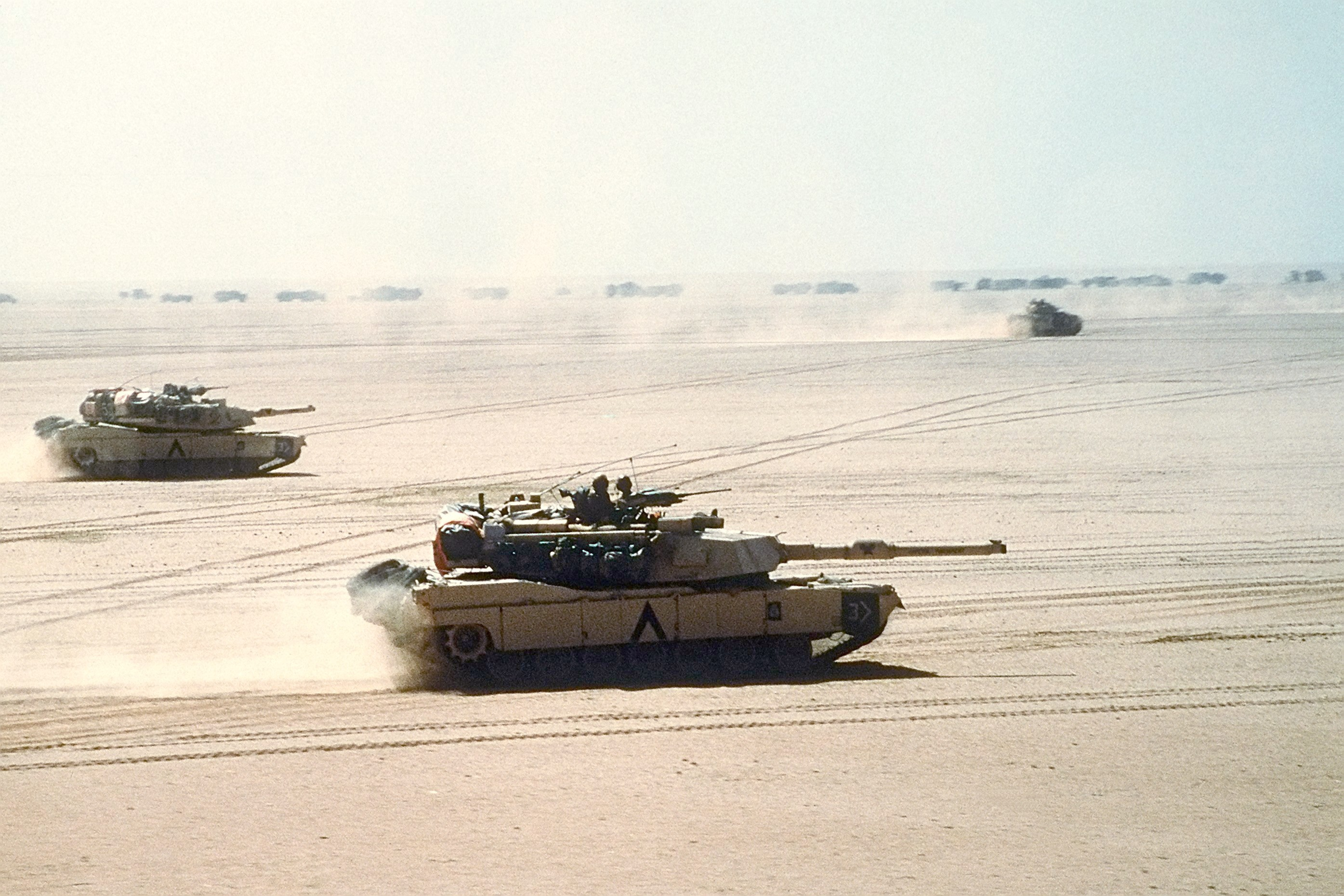
Macgregor led a contingent of 49 fighting vehicles in "the last great tank battle of the 20th century."

Commissioned as an Armor Branch officer of the United States Army in 1976, he was in West Germany with the 1st Squadron, 1st Cavalry Regiment, 1st Armored Division, from 1977. Macgregor served as the aide-de-camp to the division's deputy commanding general from 1978 to 1979, and as the S-3 air officer of the 1st Squadron, 1st Cavalry, from 1979 to 1980. He attended the Armor School in 1980, then served as the S-1/S-4 officer of the 1st Battalion, 77th Armor Regiment, at Fort Carson, Colorado, until 1981. He was a company commander there from 1981 to 1983 before attending the University of Virginia. After completing his master's degree in 1985, Macgregor worked in the department of social sciences at the United States Military Academy from 1985 to 1988.

Macgregor was the "squadron operations officer who essentially directed the Battle of 73 Easting" during the Gulf War. Facing an Iraqi Republican Guard opponent, he was part of a contingent of 19 Abrams, 26 Bradley Fighting Vehicles and four M1064 mortar carriers through the sandstorm to the 73 Easting on February 26, 1991, and in a 23-minute battle destroyed almost 70 Iraqi armored vehicles with no U.S. casualties. He was at the front center of the formation with Eagle Troop on the right and Ghost Troop on the left. Macgregor designated Eagle Troop the main attack and positioned himself to its left. Eagle Troop Scouts subsequently followed Macgregor's tank through a minefield during which his crew destroyed two enemy tanks. As Macgregor was firing from the front line, he didn't "request artillery support or report events to superiors until the battle was virtually over, according to one of his superior officers", taking risks which "could have been criticized had the fight turned ugly".

Macgregor was "one of the Army's leading thinkers on innovation", according to journalist Thomas E. Ricks. He "became prominent inside the Army" when his book Breaking the Phalanx was published in 1997, arguing for radical reforms. Breaking the Phalanx was rare in that an active duty military author was challenging the status quo with detailed reform proposals for the reorganization of U.S. Army ground forces. The head of the Army, United States General Dennis Reimer, passed out copies of the book, but its reforms failed to win the support of the general officer corps. It advocated that "the Army restructure itself into modularly organized, highly mobile, self-contained, combined arms teams that look extraordinarily like the Marine Corps' Air Ground Task Forces". His article "Thoughts on Force Design in an Era of Shrinking Defense Budgets" was published in the Israeli Dado Center Journal.

Many of Macgregor's colleagues thought his unconventional thinking may have harmed his chances for promotion to general officer. While an official at the Army's National Training Center (NTC) at Fort Irwin called him, "...the best war fighter the Army has got," colleagues of Macgregor were concerned that the Army is showing it prefers generals who are good at bureaucratic gamesmanship to ones who can think innovatively on the battlefield," and some saw him as too blunt or arrogant. Despite his top post-Gulf War NTC showing, his Army career was sidelined. The summer of 1997 marked the third time the Army refused to put him in command of a combat brigade, "a virtual death warrant for his Army career, relegating him to staff jobs as a colonel for the remainder of his service".

Macgregor was an important planner for General Wesley Clark, the military commander of NATO, during the 1999 intervention in Yugoslavia.

In the fall of 2001, Secretary of Defense Donald Rumsfeld, who had read Breaking the Phalanx, insisted that General Tommy Franks and his planning staff meet with Colonel Macgregor on January 16–17, 2002 to discuss a concept for intervention in Iraq involving the use of an armored heavy force of roughly 50,000 troops in a no warning attack straight into Baghdad.

Macgregor retired from the Army in June 2004.

== Post-military career ==
Macgregor is the vice president of Burke-Macgregor, LLC, a consulting firm based in Reston, Virginia.

In 2012, he challenged the stance of General James F. Amos, Commandant of the Marine Corps, on US Marine Corps readiness. Macgregor argued that the military capability and pertinence of the Marines, along with Army's XVIII Airborne Corps, made them both "as relevant as the Army's horse cavalry in the 1930s". In 2014, he stated that the U.S. Army is designed to benefit four-star generals, not brigade readiness.

Macgregor has appeared as a regular guest on Fox News, with at least 60 Fox weekday appearances from August 2017 to early 2022, including 48 on Tucker Carlson's show. Carlson regularly praised Macgregor, describing him as "our first choice for foreign policy analysis" and "one of the people we trust to give us real information". In May 2019, on the Carlson show, Macgregor urged Trump to replace senior national security officials, describing them as "part of this bipartisan globalist elite".

When John Bolton was removed from the White House in September 2019, Macgregor was one of five finalists under consideration for selection as President Trump's National Security Advisor.

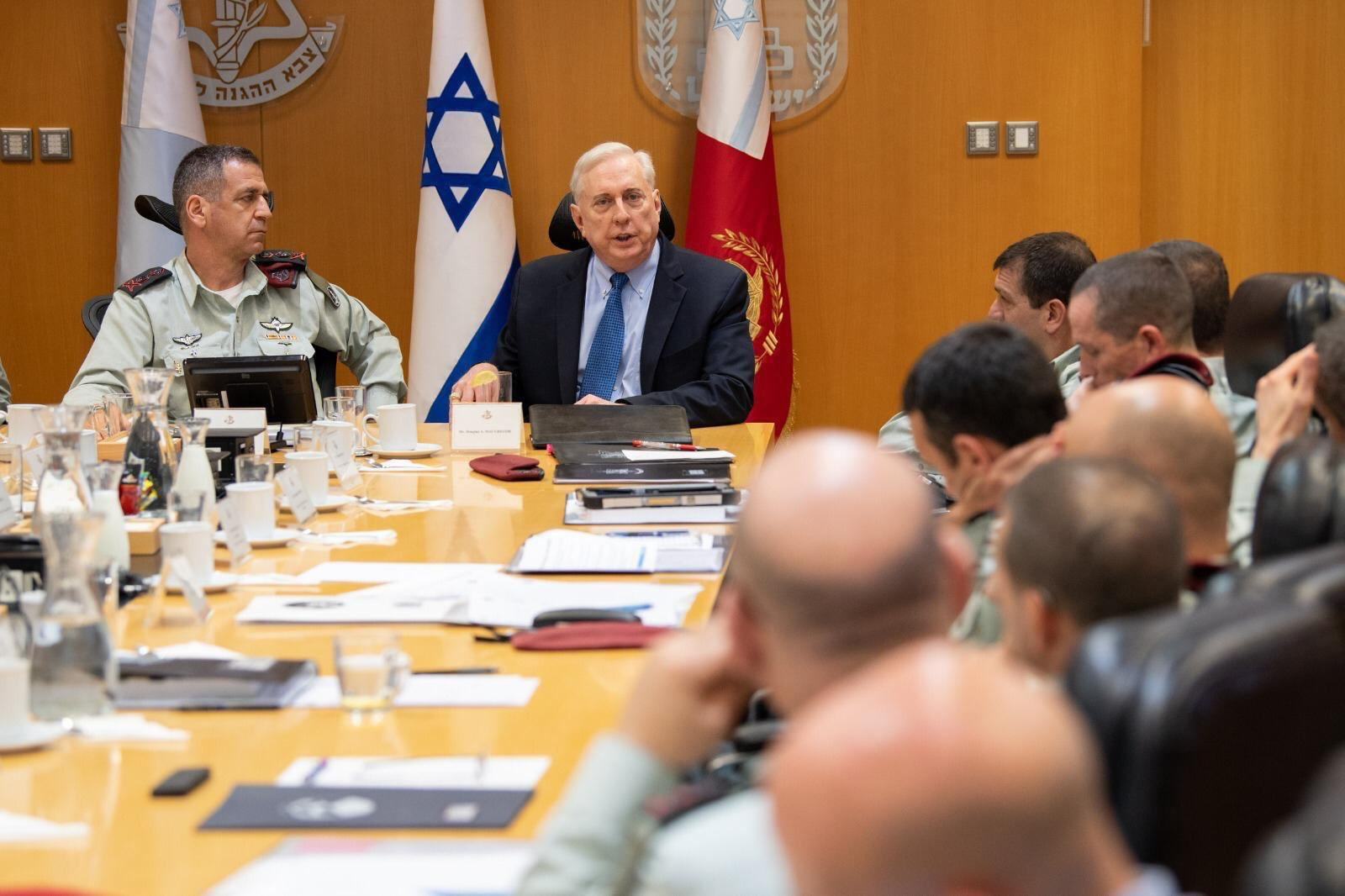
Douglas Macgregor meeting with IDF Chief of the General Staff Lieutenant General Aviv Kochavi

In 2019, Aviv Kochavi, Chief of the Israeli Defense Force General Staff made MacGregor's 2003 book, Transformation under Fire, required reading for high-ranking officers. On February 17, 2020, Macgregor traveled to Israel to meet with the IDF General Staff and many of its senior officers to discuss General Kohavi's ongoing initiative to transform the IDF for future warfighting missions in the 21st century.

In April 2020, Macgregor was reportedly Trump's second choice candidate to succeed John Rood as undersecretary of defense for policy, a position given instead to fellow Fox contributor Anthony Tata. According to Politico, Defense Secretary Mark Esper expressed reservations about him.

As of 2024, he was the chief executive officer of a group called Our Country Our Choice, and an associate member of Veteran Intelligence Professionals for Sanity.

=== U.S. Ambassador to Germany nomination ===
On July 27, 2020, the White House announced Donald Trump's intent to nominate Macgregor as U.S. Ambassador to Germany. The nomination was controversial because of Macgregor's past public statements. He had asserted that Muslim immigrants (referred to as "Muslim invaders") come to Europe "with the goal of eventually turning Europe into an Islamic state". He had argued that the German concept of Vergangenheitsbewältigung, used to cope with Germany's Nazi past and its atrocities during World War II, was a "sick mentality". Macgregor had said that martial law should be instituted on the U.S.–Mexico border and argued for the extrajudicial execution of those who cross the border at unofficial ports of entry.

His nomination stalled in the Senate Committee on Foreign Relations. On January 3, 2021, his nomination was returned to the President under Rule XXXI, Paragraph 6 of the United States Senate.

=== Senior Advisor to the Acting Secretary of Defense ===
On November 11, 2020, a Pentagon spokesperson announced that Macgregor had been hired by President Trump to serve as senior advisor to the new Acting Secretary of Defense Christopher Miller, as part of a sweeping change in senior defense staffing. At the time, Macgregor was an advocate of U.S. withdrawal from Afghanistan, a Trump policy opposed by the defense establishment. His appointment was welcomed by Senator Rand Paul, who described Macgregor as his friend. The appointment caused controversy due to Macgregor's history of comments against refugees. He held the post until Trump left office in January 2021.

=== West Point appointment ===
In December 2020, President Trump appointed Macgregor to a three-year term on the advisory board of the United States Military Academy at West Point, his alma mater. Because of the allegations of xenophobia made against him, the appointment was opposed by West Point's Black alumni organization and board member Tammy Duckworth, among others. His appointment was terminated by President Joe Biden in September 2021.

== Views ==
=== Iraq War ===
In 2004, Macgregor stated that he strongly supported the US war in Iraq, and regretted that the US had not enacted regime change in Iraq in 1991. During the beginning of the Iraq War, Macgregor disagreed with those who wanted to slow the advance into Baghdad in order to fight Fedayeen paramilitary forces. In 2006, after seven retired generals criticized then Defense Secretary Donald Rumsfeld's handling of the war, Macgregor faulted the generals themselves for poor war planning and the resulting complications in Iraq. In 2008, Macgregor stated that he would argue that American military action in Iraq and Afghanistan "has produced very serious and negative consequences for American national-security interests".

Macgregor's 2009 book, Warrior's Rage: The Great Tank Battle of 73 Easting, argues that the failure to finish the battle with the Republican Guard in 1991 led to Iraq's second major confrontation with the United States in 2003. Macgregor says that David Petraeus, Martin Dempsey, and other generals consistently exaggerated or falsified the effectiveness of the Iraqi army because "the generals were simply cultivating their Bush administration sponsors in pursuit of further promotion". By 2020, his website called the war in Iraq a failure.

=== "Underclass" and slavery ===
In a 2013 radio appearance, Macgregor spoke of an "entitled" "underclass" of people that were concentrated in "large urban areas", and the threat he said they posed: "And when the food stamps stop, when the free services end, when the heating bills aren't paid and the heating doesn't come through in many of these large cities—Chicago, Philadelphia, New York, Washington, Baltimore, St. Louis, Detroit, New Orleans, San Francisco, Los Angeles—this underclass that resides in these places, I think could become very violent."

In 2019, he argued that there were more mostly Irish "slaves" than African slaves in America in the late 1700s.

=== Immigration ===
A CNN report in 2020 said Macgregor had often used racist comments and had "demonized immigrants and refugees". It quoted Macgregor as alleging that Mexican cartels were "driving millions of Mexicans with no education, no skills and the wrong culture into the United States". It noted that Macgregor had "repeatedly advocated instituting martial law at the Mexico–United States border and to 'shoot people' if necessary". Another CNN report said he had described Muslim migrants in Europe as "unwanted invaders", arriving "with the goal of eventually turning Europe into an Islamic state".

In 2019, on the Conservative Commandos radio show, Macgregor alleged that George Soros was financing the transportation of foreigners to the United States, purportedly to destroy American culture; he made similar claims about Soros on Lou Dobbs' Fox show. In April 2021, on Frank Morano's radio show, Macgregor blamed the Democratic Party for non-European immigration purportedly to "outnumber the numbers of Americans of European ancestry". Such comments by Macgregor were described by Maddow Blog, Media Matters for America, and Insider as a version of Great Replacement Theory.

=== Kosovo War ===
In 2014, Macgregor went on Russian state-owned RT and criticized U.S. intervention in the Kosovo War in the late 1990s. He described the results of US intervention in Kosovo as to "put, essentially, a Muslim drug mafia in charge of that country".

=== NATO ===
In a 2016 presentation to military students, Macgregor said that "old alliances like NATO may vanish", arguing that it is "time to reexamine U.S. investment in 'allies' that are doing too little to secure their own sovereign interests" and that the "Cold War ended 27 years ago".

=== Israel ===
Macgregor has made statements in support of Israel having defensible borders, the annexation of the Golan Heights, and the decision to move the U.S. embassy to Jerusalem. On several occasions he has said that U.S. support for Israel is due to the "Israeli lobby" and "AIPAC" making top officials "very, very rich".

=== Ukraine and Russia ===
==== 2014 Russian annexation of Crimea ====
In 2014, after the annexation of Crimea by the Russian Federation and during a conflict with Ukraine over its eastern parts, Macgregor appeared on Russian state-owned network RT where he called for annexation of Donbas and said residents of the region "are in fact Russians, not Ukrainians, and at the same time, you have Ukrainians in the west and in the north, who are not Russians".

==== 2022 Russian invasion of Ukraine ====
After Russia's invasion of Ukraine in February 2022, Macgregor appeared on three Fox News programs in February and early March to speak in support of Russia's actions. Three days after the war began, he said, "The battle in eastern Ukraine is really almost over," and predicted "If [Ukraine] don't surrender in the next 24 hours, I suspect Russia will ultimately annihilate them." Macgregor said he believed Russia should be allowed to seize whatever parts of Ukraine it wanted. In his second appearance, he revised his prediction: "The first five days Russian forces I think frankly were too gentle. They've now corrected that. So, I would say another 10 days this should be completely over. ... I think the most heroic thing he could do right now is come to terms with reality. Neutralize Ukraine." After one of his appearances, Macgregor's comments were characterized by veteran Fox News Pentagon correspondent Jennifer Griffin as "distorting" and "appeasement" and that he was being an "apologist" for Putin. After Griffin's remarks, Tucker Carlson—who hosted Macgregor on two successive nights—remarked, "Unlike many of the so-called reporters you see on television, he is not acting secretly as a flack for Lloyd Austin at the Pentagon. No, Doug Macgregor is an honest man." Trey Gowdy, another Fox News host who interviewed Macgregor, said his viewpoint was "stunning and disappointing".

Russian state television channels RT and VGTRK broadcast excerpts of Macgregor's second Carlson appearance, which included a characterization of Ukrainian president Volodymyr Zelenskyy as a "puppet," that Russian forces had been "too gentle" in the early days of the invasion and that Russian president Vladimir Putin was being "demonized" by the United States and NATO. His opinions on Russia and Ukraine have caused controversy, with some including Liz Cheney describing Macgregor as being a member of the "Putin wing of the GOP."

In a fourth appearance in early March, Macgregor said a ceasefire was close as Ukrainian forces had been "grounded to bits. There's no question about that despite what we report on our mainstream media". He also defended Russia's invasion in an interview on The Grayzone, saying Putin had taken great care with civilians and this was delaying his victory.

In July 2022, on Real America's Voice he told Charlie Kirk that: "The war, with the exception of Kharkiv and Odesa, as far as the Russians are concerned is largely over. There is no intention to do anything else because the Russians don't have a very large army. ... This nonsense that Putin wants to conquer all of Ukraine was never true. All he ever did in the Minsk agreement was ask that Russian speakers, Russian citizens inside Ukraine be treated equally before the law. That they not be penalized for being Russians."

In September 2022, he again predicted on Carlson's show that "this war may be over soon" and later in the month "the Ukrainian army is bled white, tens of thousands of Ukrainian troops have been killed or wounded, Ukraine is really on the ropes". Liz Cheney tweeted in response: "Rupert and Lachlan Murdoch – Why do you continually put Douglas MacGregor on @FoxNews to spread Putin's propaganda and lies? This is absolutely not in America's interest."

=== "Cosmopolitans" trope ===
In an October 2021 speech to the Serbian American Voters Alliance, Macgregor blamed America's problems on what "the Russians used to call certain individuals many, many years ago, rootless cosmopolitans". Commentators noted that "rootless cosmopolitans" (Russian: Безродные Космополиты) was a Soviet antisemitic trope.

=== Iran ===
Macgregor warned that the United States entered the 2026 Iran war without a clear strategy and was underestimating Iran's resilience and military capacity, particularly its ability to sustain long-term resistance. He also rejected the idea of regime change as unrealistic, stating that military pressure or leadership strikes would likely strengthen Iranian unity rather than collapse the state. He suggested the war would likely be long, costly, and damaging to U.S. global standing, with logistical strain and regional escalation risks outweighing any potential gains. He further dismissed proposals for Pakistan to act as a mediator in the conflict as ineffective, arguing instead that India would be a more credible and capable intermediary given its geopolitical position and relations with both sides.

=== Women in combat ===
Macgregor opposes diversity and affirmative action programs in the military. In a 2021 interview, while serving on the West Point board, he said: "What we call diversity—in the extreme. In other words, affirmative action programs for every conceivable category of humanity that the left wants to come up with. Whether it's someone who is a gender neutral or homosexual or whatever else, the left loves to put us into categories and push this. And the people that went along with it and said, 'sure, let's put women into the combat forces. Let's have women everywhere.' Let's do whatever we want to do. We're going to create this brave new world where everyone is the same. There are no differences, nothing matters. So I think that's where we are."

== Select bibliography ==
- Breaking the Phalanx: A New Design for Landpower in the 21st Century, Westport (CT): Praeger, 1997, ISBN 0275957934 OCLC 35172666.
- Transformation Under Fire: Revolutionizing How America Fights, Westport (CT): Praeger, 2003, ISBN 0275981924 OCLC 52728785.
- Warrior's Rage: The Great Tank Battle of 73 Easting, Annapolis (MD): Naval Institute Press, 2009, ISBN 9781591145059 OCLC 313658347.
- Margin of Victory: Five Battles that Changed the Face of Modern War, Annapolis (MD): Naval Institute Press, 2016, ISBN 1612519962.
