= Frederick M. Franks Jr. =

US Army general

Frederick M. Franks
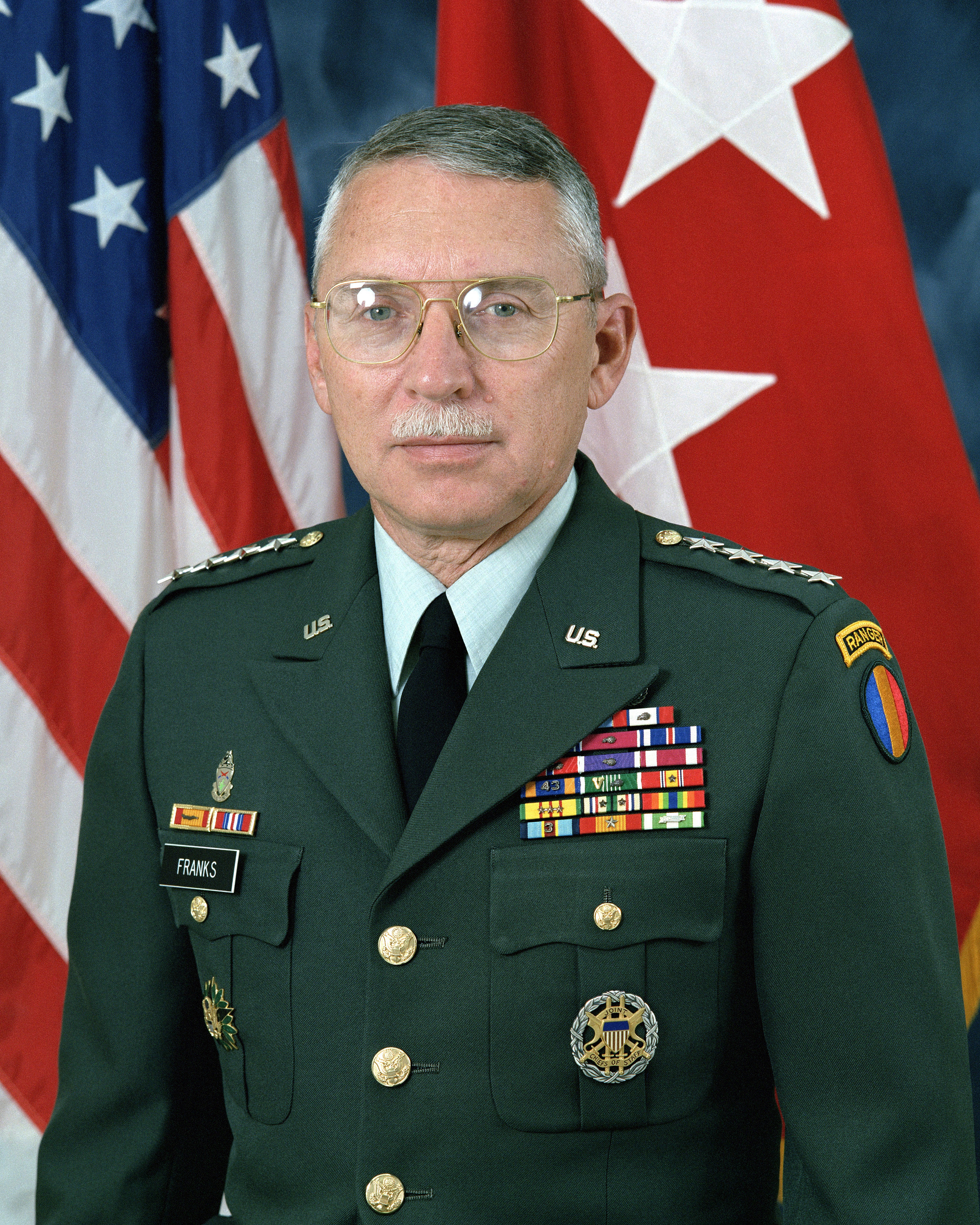
- Born: 1 November 1936 (age 89); West Lawn, Pennsylvania, U.S.
- Military career
- Allegiance: United States
- Branch: United States Army
- Service years: 1959–1994
- Rank: General
- Commands: United States Army Training and Doctrine Command; VII Corps; 1st Armored Division; 11th Armored Cavalry Regiment; 1st Squadron, 3rd Cavalry Regiment
- Conflicts: Vietnam War; Gulf War; Battle of Al Busayyah
- Awards: Defense Distinguished Service Medal; Army Distinguished Service Medal (3); Silver Star; Legion of Merit (2); Distinguished Flying Cross; Bronze Star Medal (2); Purple Heart (2)
- Other work: Board of Directors, Oshkosh Truck Corporation, author, consultant, public speaker

Frederick Melvin Franks Jr. (born 1 November 1936) is a retired general of the United States Army. He commanded the Gulf War coalition VII Corps in the highly successful "Left Hook" maneuver against fourteen Iraqi divisions, a number of which were Iraqi Republican Guard, defeating or forcing the retreat of each with fewer than 100 American casualties lost to enemy action.

== Early life ==
Born in West Lawn, Pennsylvania, Fred Franks graduated from the United States Military Academy at West Point, New York in 1959. After attending the Armor Officer Basic Course, Airborne, and Ranger training, he joined the 11th Armored Cavalry Regiment in Germany. This was followed by an assignment as an instructor at West Point in the 1960s.

== Military career ==
Following his duty at West Point, Franks rejoined the 11th Armored Cavalry Regiment, serving with the unit in Vietnam. In a period of intense combat, he received the Silver Star, Distinguished Flying Cross, the Bronze Star Medal with "V" Device, the Air Medal, and two Purple Hearts. While fighting in Cambodia he was severely wounded, and after a series of unsuccessful surgeries, lost his left leg, which was amputated below the knee. Franks fought to remain in a combat unit, something not normally granted to amputees, and was eventually permitted to remain in combat arms.

Through the 1980s Franks served with the Army Staff in the Pentagon, commanded 1st Squadron, 3d Armored Cavalry Regiment at Fort Bliss, served in the Office of the Army Chief of Staff, spent a year at the national War College, held several high-level positions in the United States Army Training and Doctrine Command, and, finally, commanded the 11th Armored Cavalry Regiment, assigned to the East German frontier as the V Corps covering force.

Following promotion to brigadier general in 1984, Franks' flag-level assignments included Commanding General, Seventh Army Training Command, Deputy Commanding General, United States Army Command and General Staff College, and Director of Operational Plans and Interoperability (J-7), where he effectively integrated, for the first time, all joint staff operational planning, interoperability and warfighting functions within a single directorate of the Joint Staff, resulting in significant increases in the joint warfighting capabilities of the United States. In 1988, Franks again returned to Germany to command the 1st Armored Division, and a year later he assumed command of VII Corps.

=== Gulf War ===
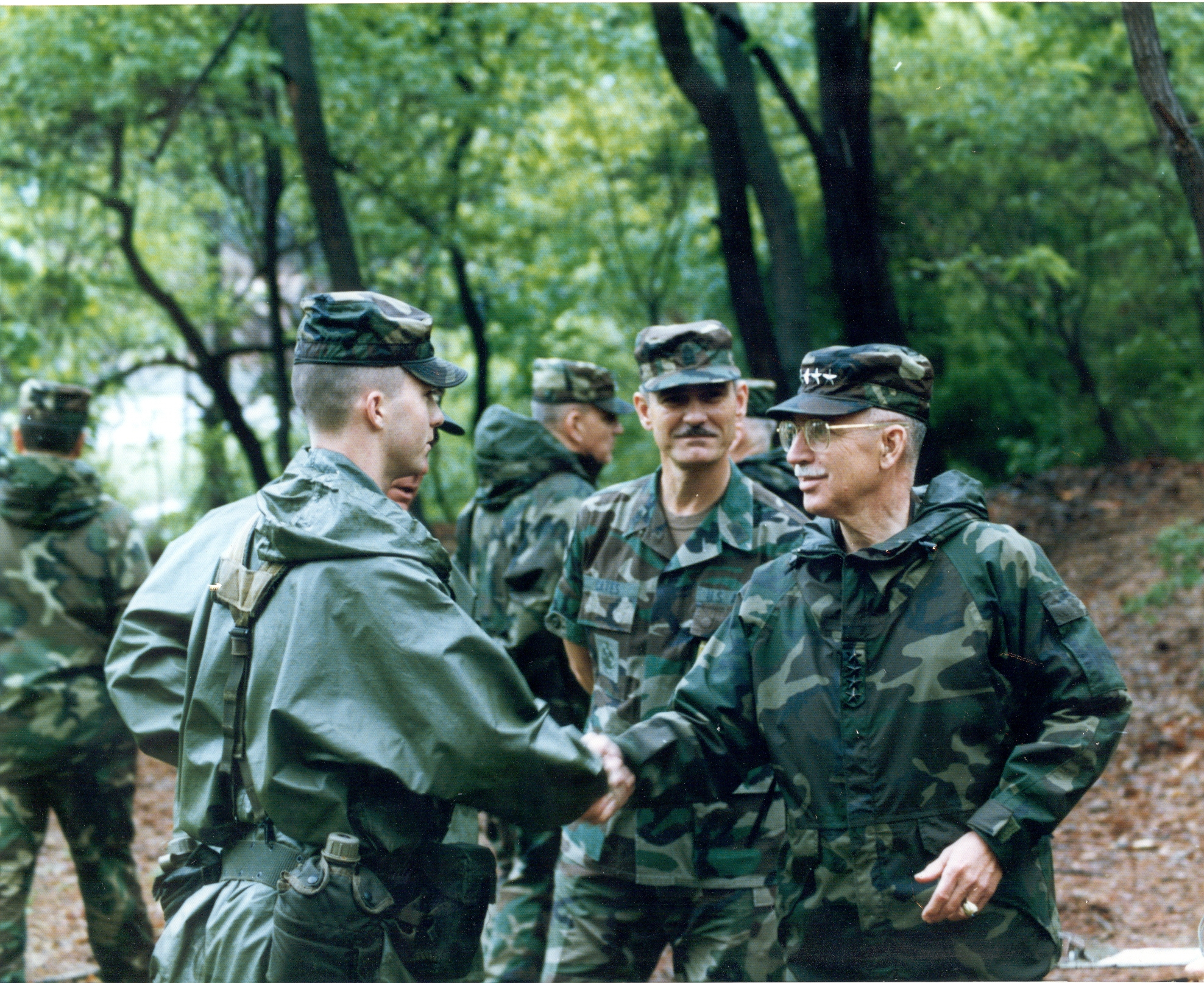
General Franks with Corporal Daniel L. Dow, at 2nd Infantry Division (South Korea) NCO Academy on 31 May 1993

In early November 1990, Franks was ordered to deploy VII Corps to Saudi Arabia to join the international coalition preparing to drive Iraqi forces from Kuwait; and on 24 February 1991, the Desert Storm land assault began, with VII Corps making the main attack. VII Corps consisted of 146,000 American and British soldiers in essentially five armored divisions (one was a mechanized infantry division and one was a cavalry division). This consisted of close to 1600 tanks, American and British, and 800 helicopters. Supporting this was its support command and vital logistics support command comprising over 26,000 soldiers and 15 hospitals. In total, VII Corps consumed over two million gallons of fuel a day. In 100 hours of rapid maneuver and combat, VII Corps fought several engagements with Iraqi forces. Under Franks' leadership, VII Corps units gained decisive victories at the Battle of Al Busayyah, the Battle of 73 Easting, the Battle of Norfolk and the Battle of Medina Ridge.

On the second day of the ground war, General Norman Schwarzkopf publicly expressed frustration over what he characterized as VII Corps' slow pace, allowing elements of the Republican Guard to escape destruction by fleeing toward Basra. Franks later gave his reasons for the slow pace to a documentary filmmaker. He said that "I was thinking of forty eight hours ahead. I wanted to be in a posture that when we hit the Republican Guard, that we would hit them with a fist massed from an unexpected direction at full speed, and so what I needed to do was get the corps in a posture that would allow this to happen." He also worried about friendly fire in the fluid opening phase of ground operations. In his memoir, Franks criticized Schwarzkopf as a career infantryman who had little feel for the maneuvering of armored formations and for being a "chateau general" by trying to run the war from a bunker 400 miles to the south in Riyadh, Saudi Arabia.

Franks is credited in United States Air Force history in bringing modern day ISR capabilities to the fight. After witnessing a demonstration of JSTARS in exercise Deep Strike in Germany, Franks' positive impression led to him raving about the capability to Schwarzkopf. JSTARS proved indispensable in providing the JFACC with real-time intelligence and targeting information on advancing and retreating Iraqi ground forces.

Following the Gulf War, Franks was promoted to full general, and took over the United States Army Training and Doctrine Command. He retired in 1994 after almost 35 1/2 years of active Army service.

== Post-military ==
External videos
- Booknotes interview with Franks and Tom Clancy on Into the Storm, July 13, 1997, C-SPAN

Franks now serves as chairman of the board of the VII Corps Desert Storm Veterans Association, which assists veterans and next of kin of those who served in VII Corps during Desert Storm. He also collaborated with Tom Clancy on a book, Into the Storm – On the Ground in Iraq. He works with the U. S. Army's Battle Command Training Program for senior tactical commanders and staffs teaching battle command in seminars and simulated war games. He also works as a consultant, speaks publicly on leadership, and teaches senior level battle command at military schools in the United States and United Kingdom. He serves on the Board of Directors of Oshkosh Truck Corporation, the Customer Advisory Board for United Defense Corporation, and the Board of Trustees of the U.S. Military Academy. On 19 March 2011, he received the Guardian of Liberty Award, presented by the West Point Society of Philadelphia at the Union League in Philadelphia.

Franks also received the 2018 Henry Viscardi Achievement Awards given to leaders in disability sector.

Military offices
Preceded by John W. Foss	Commanding General, United States Army Training and Doctrine Command; 1991–1994	Succeeded by William W. Hartzog
