= Iron Brigade (disambiguation) =

Iron Brigade may refer to:

- Iron Brigade, a Union American Civil War brigade consisting of the 2nd Wisconsin Volunteer Infantry Regiment, 6th Wisconsin Volunteer Infantry Regiment, 7th Wisconsin Volunteer Infantry Regiment, 19th Indiana Volunteer Infantry Regiment, and the 24th Michigan Volunteer Infantry
- Eastern Iron Brigade (the First Iron Brigade), a Union American Civil War brigade, consisting of the 22nd New York Volunteer Infantry Regiment, 24th New York Volunteer Infantry Regiment, 30th New York Volunteer Infantry Regiment, 14th Regiment (New York State Militia), 2nd United States Volunteer Sharpshooter Regiment, and the 2nd Regiment New York Volunteer Cavalry
- Horn Brigade, also known as the "Iron Brigade of the Army of the Cumberland."
- Shelby's Iron Brigade, a CSA American Civil War cavalry brigade.
- A Union American Civil War brigade, the 3rd Brigade, 1st Division, III Corps consisting of 17th Maine Volunteer Infantry Regiment, 3rd Michigan Volunteer Infantry Regiment, 5th Michigan Volunteer Infantry Regiment, 1st New York Volunteer Infantry Regiment, 37th New York Volunteer Infantry Regiment, and the 101st New York Volunteer Infantry Regiment
- The Austrian brigade led by Leopold Gondrecourt in the Battle for Königshügel (where it acquired the name), and later Ferdinand Poschacher von Poschach in the Austro-Prussian War battles of Podol, Gitschin and Königgrätz (Infanterieregiment Baron Martini Nr. 30, Infanterieregiment König von Preussen Nr. 34, 18. Feld-Jäger-Bataillon)
- A spoof march written for piano quintet in 1916 by Arnold Schoenberg.
- Two post-WWI German Freikorps units, one raised in the Baltics and later renamed the 'Iron Division', a second raised in Kiel from naval personnel and later renamed I. Marine Brigade.
- The 1st Armored Brigade Combat Team of the 2nd Infantry Division of the U.S. Army
- The 2nd Brigade of the U.S. Army's 1st Armored Division
- Previously ascribed to the 3rd Brigade of the 4th Infantry Division, now known as Team "Striker"
- The 2011 video game Trenched by Double Fine, later titled Iron Brigade worldwide due to trademark issues.
