= Safwan Hill =

Mountain in Iraq

- Jabal Sanam
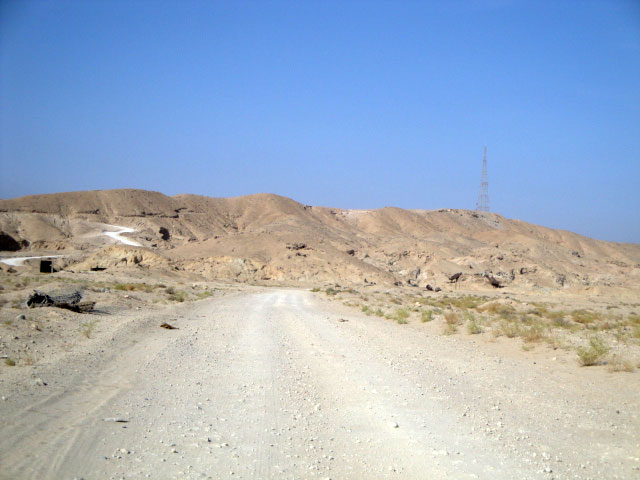

Highest point
- Elevation: 440 ft (130 m)

Geography
- Location: Basra Governorate, southern Iraq

Safwan Hill (or Jabal Sanam) is located in Basra Governorate, southern Iraq. Safwan Hill is the highest terrain feature in the region, at approximately 440 feet (130 m).

== Iraq War 2003 ==
On 19 March 2003 the United States Marine Corps 3rd Marine Air Wing attacked the Iraqi Army observation post on Safwan Hill.
