= Into the Storm: On the Ground in Iraq =

1997 non-fiction book by Tom Clancy

- First edition
- Author: Tom Clancy
- Language: English
- Series: Study of Command
- Genre: Non-fiction
- Publisher: G.P. Putnam's Sons
- Publication date: 1997
- Publication place: United States

Into the Storm (1997) is a non-fiction history book and the first book in American author Tom Clancy's study of command series. Clancy traces the organizational success story of the U.S. Army's rise since the Vietnam War.

It is also a partial biography of General Frederick M. Franks, Jr., who is considered to be a military visionary and a distinguished combat commander, famous for having led the Gulf War coalition VII Corps in the highly successful "Left Hook" maneuver against fourteen Iraqi divisions of the Iraqi Republican Guard, forcing a retreat with fewer than 100 American casualties lost to enemy action — a feat unmatched in modern warfare.

The book also describes the transformation of the U.S. Army, traumatized by the Vietnam War, and Franks' devastating loss of a leg in that war. Franks became the first amputee active-duty general since the American Civil War.

The book is mostly written by Tom Clancy with sections where he uses General Franks' own words.
