= Phase line (cartography) =

In cartography, a phase line is a line to show some positional dependency or relation to the passage of time, most often changing phases of a military operation, or changing borders in histogeographic maps.

== Military usage ==
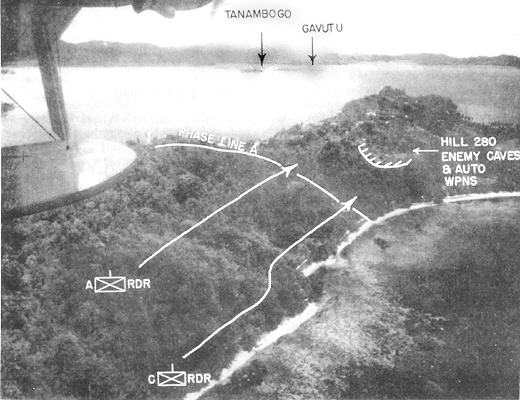
A photo with overdrawn phase line illustrating a World War II military operation.

The term is also used in military terminology to refer to an imaginary line on a map used to coordinate phases of operations. They are usually distinguished with different code names, varying by the particulars of the mission such as location and nature. By the same token, phase lines are frequently used after a battle or a military campaign by historians to describe what territory was controlled by which side at a given phase of the campaign.

== Historical geography ==
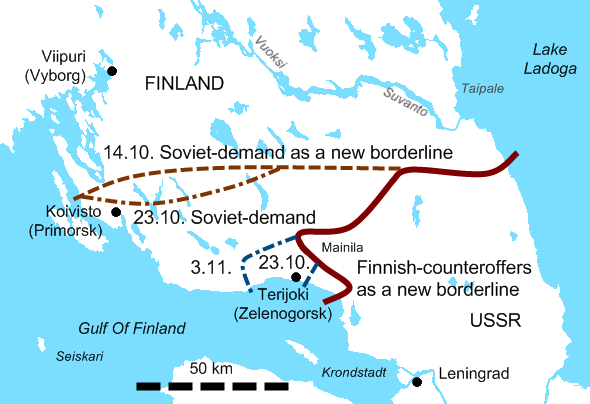
A map of negotiated border lines at different stages of the Finnish Winter War.

Historical geographers use such techniques in a similar way, but written over a longer time period. Dated phase lines on a map would indicate the growth or shrinkage of a great power of the era such as the expansion of the Roman Empire, the spread of Islam or Christianity. Other familiar phase line mapping most experienced in late elementary or middle school classes would be the extent of various ice ages or the Ice Age consequential shrinkage or extension of continental landmasses down the continental shelves as the result of such climate changes.
