= Safwan, Iraq =

Human settlement in Iraq

Safwan صفوان
- Location in Iraq
- Coordinates: 30°07′00″N 47°43′00″E
- Country: Iraq
- Governorate: Basra
- District: Az Zubayr

Population (2014)
  - Total: 70,000

Safwan (Arabic: صفوان, Kurdish: سەفووان, sêfûan) is a town in southeast Iraq on the border with Kuwait. It was the site of the Safwan Air Base.

== Etymology ==
The city of Safwan is attributed to its founder Safwan bin Assal Al Muradi Al Yamani, a companion (Sahaba) of the Islamic prophet Muhammad who participated in the conquest of Iraq in the middle ages. He settled in Kufa, northeast of Najaf at first but then moved to Safwan, south of Basra along with his tribe who later named the city in his name.

Safwan is also part of the Az Zubayr district south of Basra and has a population of 70,000 people.

== History ==
=== During Muhammad's era ===
Muhammad ordered a Military expedition in Safwan. The expedition was ordered by Muhammad after he received intelligence that Kurz ibn Jabir al-Fihri rustled some grazing cattle belonging to Muslims. It occurred directly after the Invasion of Waddan in the year 2 AH of the Islamic calendar. Therefore, Muhammad directed about 70 Muslims, who chased him to Safwan, at the outskirts of Badr. But Kurz ibn Jabir al-Fihri managed to escape.

=== Persian Gulf War ===
Safwan is located in the south of Iraq at Iraqi Kuwaiti border, along the infamous Highway of Death from the Gulf War. The cease-fire negotiations between General Norman Schwarzkopf and the Iraqi delegation led by Lieutenant General Sultan Hashim Ahmad took place at Safwan airfield. Schwarzkopf's demand to hold the formal cease-fire negotiations in Iraqi territory led to the encounter between the 1st squadron, 4th Cavalry regiment (Quarterhorse) from Ft. Riley, Ks. of the U.S. 1st Infantry Division (Mechanized) and the Iraqi Republican Guard, known in military circles as The Ultimatum. This was detailed in the books Third Graders At War and Road to Safwan.

== See also ==
- List of expeditions of Muhammad
