= Task Force 1-41 Infantry =

U.S. Army Gulf War heavy battalion task force

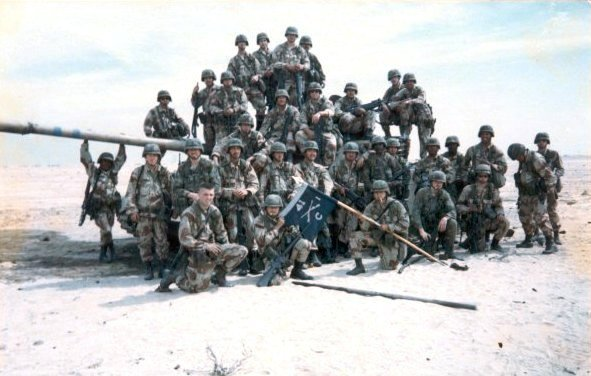
Soldiers of 2nd Platoon, Company C, 1st Battalion, 41st Infantry Regiment pose with a captured Iraqi tank during the 1st Gulf War, February 1991.

Task Force 1-41 Infantry was a U.S. Army heavy battalion task force which took part in the Gulf War of January – March 1991. It was also known as Task Force Iron. Task Force 1-41 Infantry was the first coalition force to breach the Saudi Arabian border on 15 February 1991 and conduct ground combat operations in Iraq engaging in direct and indirect fire fights with the enemy on 17 February 1991. It was the spearhead of VII Corps.

The Task Force served at the Battle of 73 Easting and the Battle of Norfolk where it was assigned to the U.S. 1st Infantry Division. It engaged and destroyed elements of 11 Iraqi divisions by the end of combat operations. This includes a significant role in the destruction of 4 Iraqi armored brigades at the Battle of Norfolk.

Task Force 1-41 Infantry was awarded a Valorous Unit Award for its accomplishments during combat operations. It consisted primarily of the 1st Battalion, 41st Infantry Regiment, 3rd Battalion, 66th Armor Regiment, and the 4th Battalion, 3rd Field Artillery Regiment all being part of the 2nd Armored Division (Forward), based at Lucius D. Clay Kaserne, 24 kilometres (15 mi) north of Bremen, in the Federal Republic of Germany. Task Force 1-41 was commanded by Lieutenant Colonel James L. Hillman.

== Organization ==
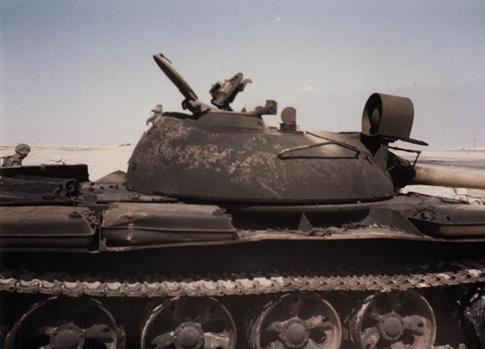
An Iraqi Republican Guard T-55 tank destroyed by Task Force 1-41 Infantry during the 1st Gulf War, February 1991.

Task Force 1-41 Infantry comprised the following units:

- Headquarters and Headquarters Company (HHC), 1st Battalion, 41st Infantry
- Company B, 1st Battalion, 41st Infantry
- Company C, 1st Battalion, 41st Infantry
- Company A, 3rd Battalion, 66th Armor
- Company B, 3rd Battalion, 66th Armor
- Company D, 317th Engineer Battalion
- Company D, 9th Engineer Battalion
- 3rd Platoon, Battery C, 2nd Battalion, 3rd Air Defense Artillery
- Two Ground Support Radar sections
- Fire Support Element, 4th Battalion, 3rd Field Artillery
- System Support Team, 498th Support Battalion

== History ==
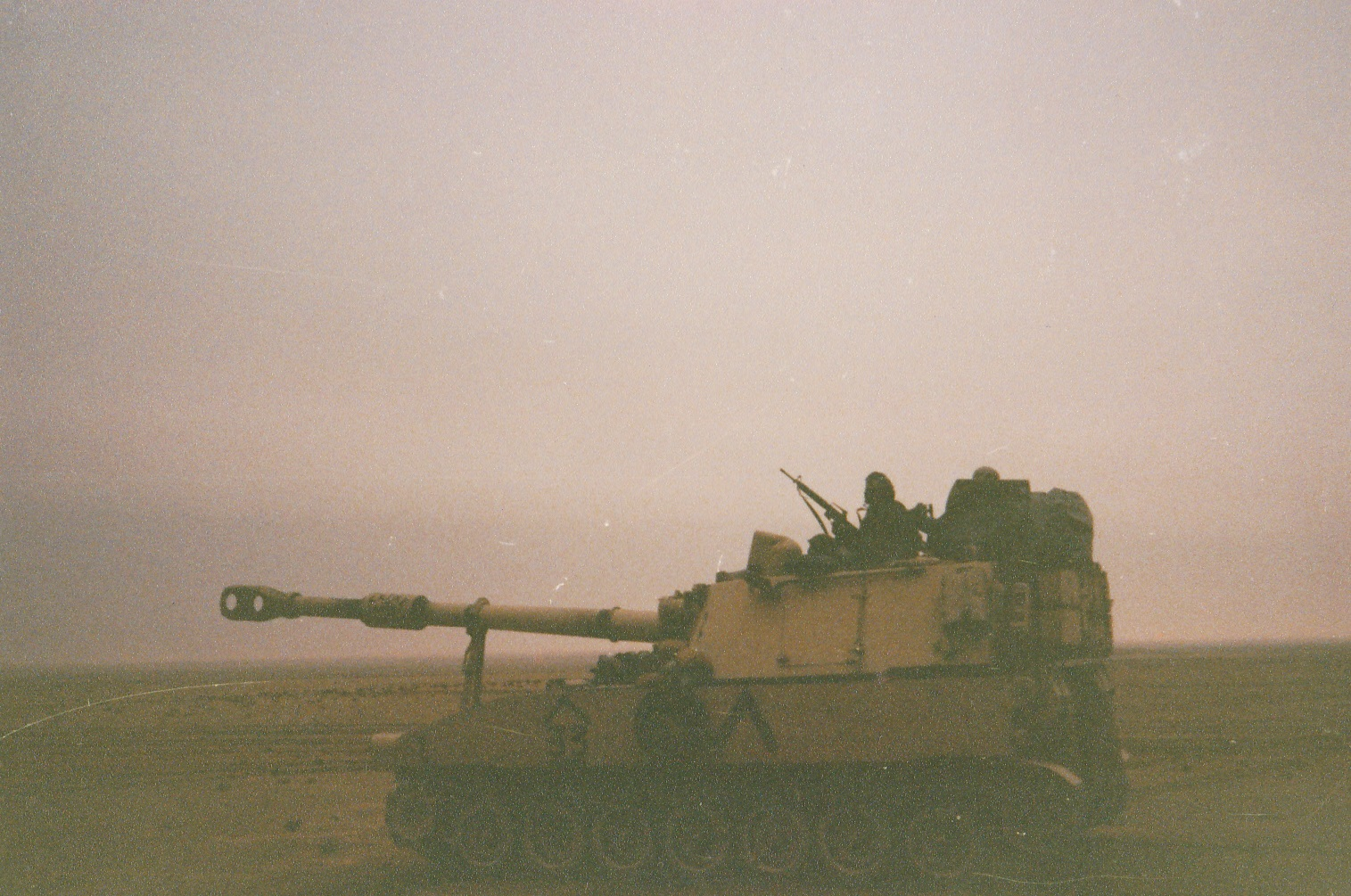
A M109A2 howitzer belonging to Battery C, 4th Battalion of the 3rd Field Artillery Regiment, 2nd Armored Division (FWD) during the Gulf War, February 1991.

=== Formation ===
The 2nd Armored Division (Forward) arrived in Saudi Arabia in early January 1991, with 1-41 Infantry arriving on 8 January. After arrival in Saudi Arabia, the 1st Battalion, 41st Infantry, was task organized (effectively merged in parts) with the 3rd Battalion, 66th Armor Regiment. This 'task organization', routine before combat, was designed to ensure that infantry and armour were present in balanced organizations so that they could provide mutual support.

The task force's higher headquarters, 3rd Brigade, 2nd Armored Division, was attached to the 1st Infantry Division (Mechanized) to make up for a missing brigade of that division. The brigade became also known as Task Force Iron. It became the spearhead of VII Corps. The U.S.VII Corps was a formidable fighting force. In its inventory were 1,487 tanks, 1,384 infantry fighting vehicles, 568 artillery pieces, 132 MLRS, 8 missile launchers, and 242 attack helicopters. It had a total troop strength of 146,321 troops.

The 1st Battalion, 41st Infantry Regiment was equipped with M2 Bradley infantry fighting vehicles and formed part of the 2nd Armored Division (Forward). The other combat battalions of the brigade were the 2nd and 3rd Battalions of the 66th Armor Regiment, equipped with M1A1 Abrams tanks, and the 4th Battalion of the 3rd Field Artillery Regiment, equipped with M109 howitzers. During exercises the battalion regularly exchanged combat elements with the other combat units in the division, with B company of 3-66 Armor being frequently attached to 1-41 Infantry.

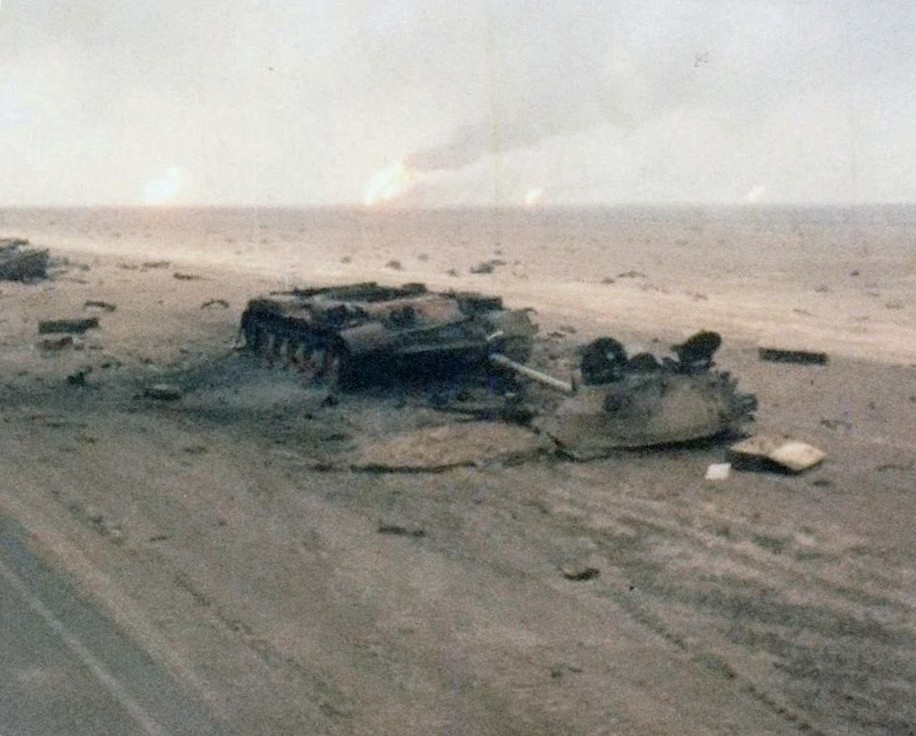
Iraqi tanks destroyed by Task Force 1-41 Infantry during the 1st Gulf War, February 1991.

After receiving their equipment and moving to a forward area near the border with Iraq, 1-41 Infantry and 3-66 Armor exchanged companies on 31 January to task organize for combat. A and D companies of 1-41 Infantry were attached to 3-66 Armor, and the infantry battalion received A and B companies of 3-66 Armor. Task Force 1-41 also comprised two companies of engineers, a platoon from the 2nd Battalion, 3rd Air Defense Artillery Regiment and a fire support element from the 4-3 FA. While technically not part of the Task Force, ten U.S. Army Special Forces ODAs performed reconnaissance operations for the Task Force and other elements of VII Corps. 4-3 FA relied on its Field Artillery Advance Party Teams to perform its reconnaissance operations.

=== Counter reconnaissance operations ===
Shortly after arrival in theatre Task Force 1-41 Infantry received a counter reconnaissance mission. This generally includes destroying or repelling the Iraqi's reconnaissance elements and denying their commander any observation of friendly forces. 1-41 Infantry was assisted by the 1st Squadron, 4th Cavalry Regiment. This joint effort would become known as Task Force Iron. On 15 February 1991 4th Battalion of the 3rd Field Artillery Regiment, fired on a trailer and a few trucks in the Iraqi sector that was observing American forces. On 16 February 1991 several groups of Iraqi vehicles appeared to be performing reconnaissance on the Task Force and were driven away by fire from 4-3 FA.

That same evening an Iraqi platoon, including six vehicles, was reported as being to the northeast of the Task Force. They belonged to the Iraqi 25th Infantry Division. They were engaged with artillery fire from 4-3 FA. Later that evening another group of Iraqi vehicles was spotted moving towards the center of the Task Force. The vehicles appeared to be Iraqi Soviet made BTR-60s and tanks. Task Force 1-41 Infantry fired TOW missiles at the Iraqi formation destroying one tank. The rest of the formation was destroyed or driven away by artillery fire from 4-3 FA. For the next hour the Task Force fought several small battles with Iraqi reconnaissance units.

On 17 February 1991 the Task Force took enemy mortar fire, and the Iraqi forces managed to escape. Later that evening the Task Force received enemy artillery fire but suffered no casualties. That same evening the Task Force identified an Iraqi mortar position and engaged it with both direct and indirect fires. The Iraqis continued probing operations against the Task Force for approximately two hours. For the next two days the Task Force observed Iraqi wheeled vehicles and small units move in front of them. Several times Iraqi mortars fired on Task Force 1-41 Infantry positions.

On 18 February Iraqi mortar positions continued to conduct fire missions against the Task Force. The Task Force returned fire on the Iraqi positions with artillery fire from 4-3 FA and 1st Infantry Division Artillery. During the Iraqi mortar attacks two American soldiers were wounded. Iraqi reconnaissance elements continued to patrol the area between the Task Force and the 1st Cavalry Division. VII Corps air units and artillery conducted combat operations against Iraqi defensive positions.

=== Breaching operations ===
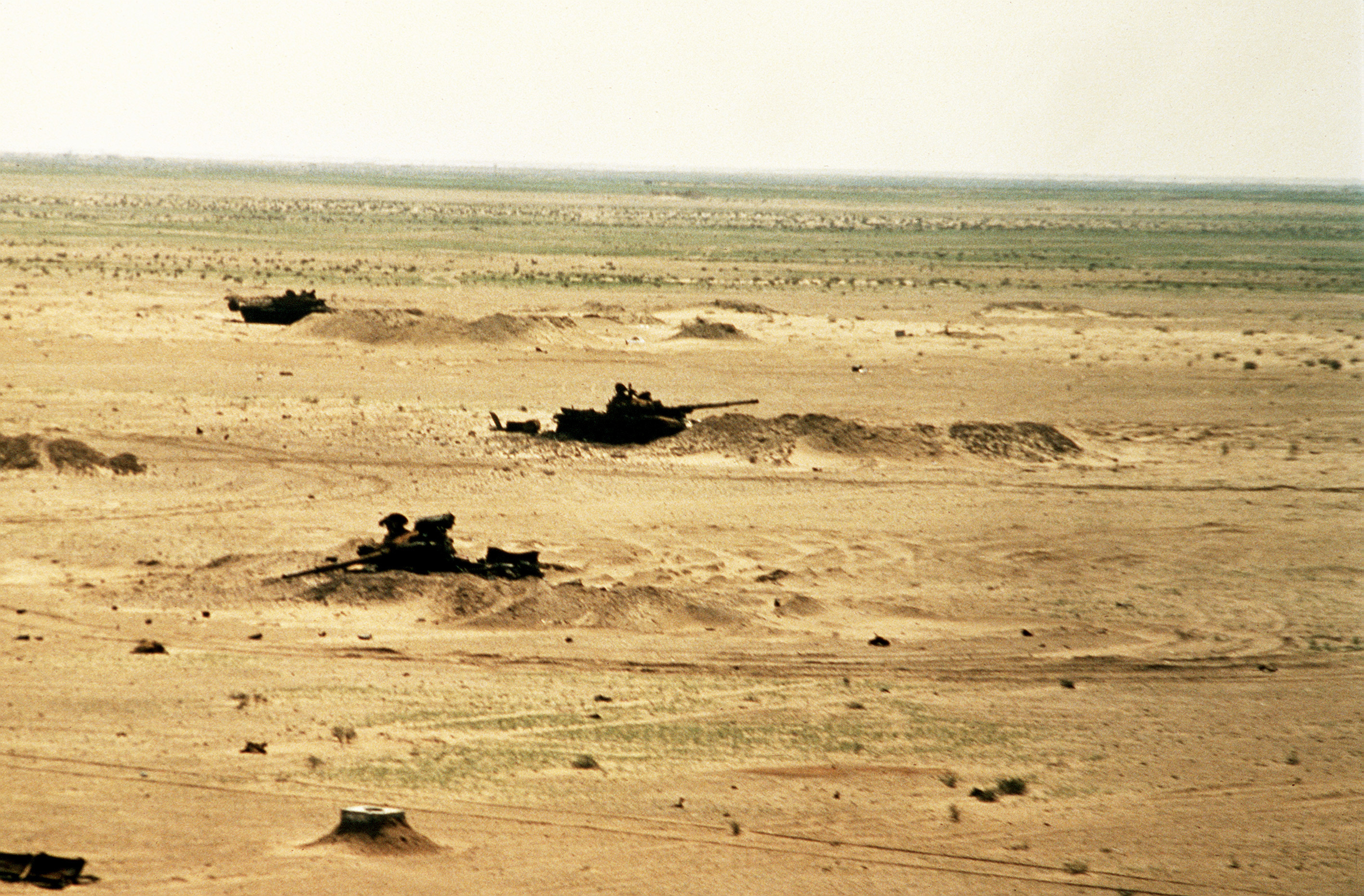
Task Force 1-41 Infantry destroyed multiple Iraqi tanks in defensive entrenchments.

On 15 February 1991, Task Force 1-41 Infantry was the first coalition force to breach the Saudi Arabian border. On 17 February 1991, they conducted ground combat operations in Iraq, engaging in direct and indirect fire fights with the enemy. On 17 February 1991, Task Force 1-41 Infantry engaged an Iraqi mortar position with direct and indirect fires. Prior to this action the Task Force's primary fire support battalion 4th Battalion of the 3rd Field Artillery Regiment participated in a massive artillery preparation against Iraq's VII Corps. Around 300 guns from multiple nations participated in the artillery barrage. Over 14,000 rounds were fired during these missions against the Iraqi VII Corps.

M270 Multiple Launch Rocket Systems contributed an additional 4,900 rockets fired at Iraqi targets. Iraq lost close to 22 artillery battalions during the initial stages of this barrage. This included the destruction of approximately 396 Iraqi artillery pieces. By the end of these raids Iraqi artillery assets had all but ceased to exist. An Iraqi unit totally destroyed during the preparation was the Iraqi 48th Infantry Division Artillery Group. The group's commander stated his unit lost 83 of its 100 guns to the artillery preparation. This artillery prep was supplemented by air attacks by B-52 bombers and Lockheed AC-130 fixed wing gunships.

On 20 February 1991, 4-3 FA participated in an artillery raid against multiple Iraqi targets. This raid led to the destructions of multiple Iraqi artillery and armor units along with multiple command posts. On 22 February and 23 February 1st Infantry Division artillery and 4-3 FA conducted artillery raids against Iraqi targets.

On 23 February 1991, 4-3 FA participated in another successful artillery raid. This raid led to the destruction of additional Iraqi artillery assets, maneuver, command, and logistics targets. The 1st Infantry Division Artillery and AH-64 Apache attack helicopters conducted operations against the Iraqi 26th Infantry Division. B-52 bombers conducted missions against the Iraqi 48th Infantry Division. On 24 February 1991, 1st Cavalry Division conducted artillery and aviation missions against a series of Iraqi bunkers, which were supported by Iraqi 25th Division's T-55 tank units.

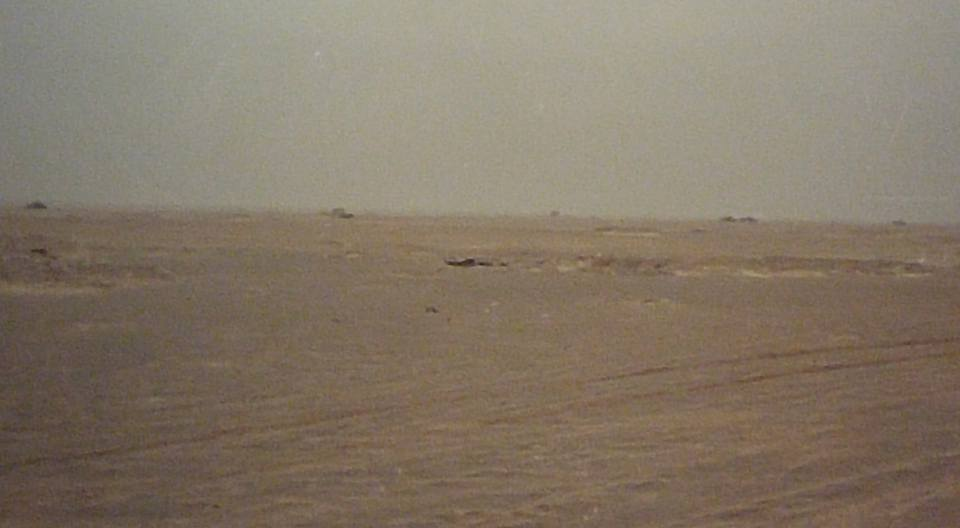
An Iraqi defensive position in Task Force 1-41 Infantry's sector of operations during the Battle of 73 Easting. The tops of Iraqi tanks can be seen as they sit in defensive entrenchments. More destroyed Iraqi armor is in the distant background.

Once into Iraqi territory Task Force 1-41 Infantry encountered multiple Iraqi defensive positions and bunkers. These defensive positions were occupied by a brigade-sized element. Task Force 1-41 Infantry elements dismounted and prepared to engage the enemy soldiers which occupied these well-prepared and heavily fortified bunkers. The Task Force found itself engaged in six hours of combat in order to clear the extensive bunker complex. The Iraqis engaged the Task Force with small arms fire, RPGs, mortar fire, and what was left of Iraqi artillery assets. A series of battles unfolded which resulted in heavy Iraqi casualties and the Iraqis being removed from their defensive positions, with many becoming prisoners of war. Some escaped to be killed or captured by other coalition forces.

In the process of clearing the bunkers, Task Force 1-41 captured two brigade command posts and the command post of the Iraqi 26th Infantry Division. The Task Force also captured a brigade commander, several battalion commanders, company commanders, and staff officers. As combat operations progressed, Task Force 1-41 Infantry engaged multiple dug in enemy tanks at short range in ambush positions. For a few hours, bypassed Iraqi RPG equipped anti-tank teams, T-55 tanks, and dismounted Iraqi infantry fired at passing American vehicles, only to be destroyed by other US tanks and fighting vehicles following the initial forces.

=== Combat ===
A two and one half hour 90,000 round artillery preparation fire, on Iraqi defensive positions, preceded the major ground assault.

On 24 February 1991 the Task Force was engaged by Iraqi infantry units armed with RPGs. The Iraqi soldiers were either killed or captured. Later that same day 4-3 FA conducted artillery strikes to the north of its position against Iraqi targets. The Iraqis engaged Task Force 1–41 with artillery and mortar fire with little success. That same day the Task Force, along with other American units, continued clearing Phase Line New Jersey. Later on 24 February 1991 Task Force 1-41 had a hand in the destruction of the Iraqi 110th and 434th Infantry Brigades of the Iraqi 26th Infantry Division.

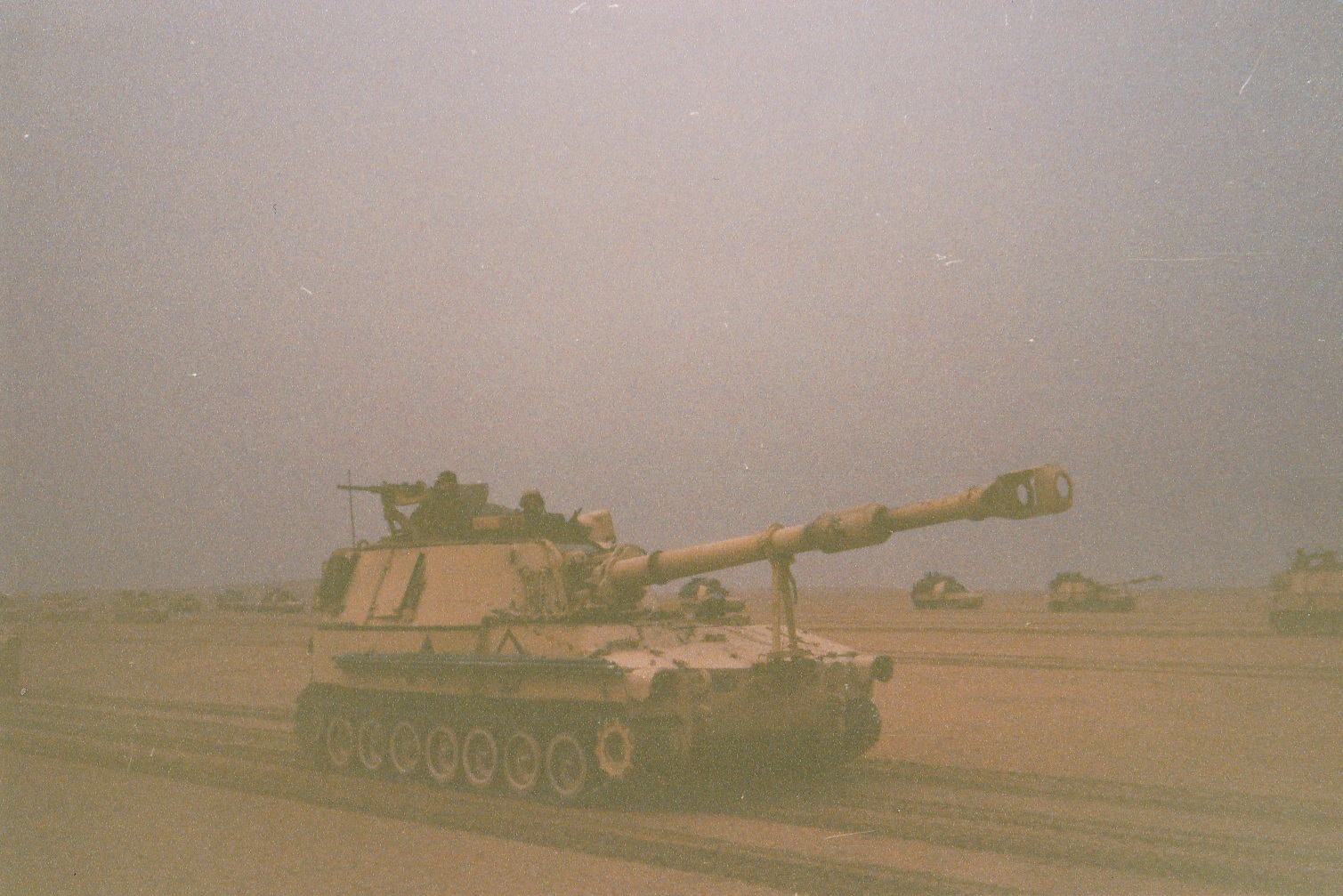
Battery C, 4th Battalion of the 3rd Field Artillery Regiment, 2nd Armored Division (FWD) moves into position to conduct fire missions during the Battle of Norfolk, February 1991.

On 25 February 1991 the Task Force would engage and destroy the Iraqi Jihad Corps, which consisted of the 10th and 12th Armored Divisions, in direct combat. The Iraqi 10th Armored Division was considered the best regular division in the Iraqi Army. It had more modern equipment than the other regular Iraqi units. It was equipped with T-72 and T-62 tanks. The T-62 tank being its primary system. It also engaged a formation of the Iraqi 110th Infantry Brigade along with the 1st Infantry Division.

On 26 February 1991 the Task Force, led by 3-66 Armor Battalion, would engage and destroy an Iraqi T-55 tank battalion.

On the eve of 26–27 February 1991 the Task Force destroyed elements of the Iraqi 12th Armored Division. This was a slow moving division that lacked the capability for modern day armored warfare. Some 40 Iraqi tanks were destroyed and a similar number of other combat vehicles.

The Task Force served at the Battle of 73 Easting with the 1st Infantry Division (Mechanized) along with the 2nd Armored Cavalry Regiment. They were responsible for destroying the Iraqi 18th Mechanized and 9th Armored Brigades of the Republican Guard Tawakalna Mechanized Infantry Division and the Iraqi 26th Infantry Division. The Tawakalna Republican Guard Division was Iraq's most powerful division which included approximately 14,000 soldiers, 220 T-72 tanks, 284 infantry fighting vehicles, 126 artillery pieces, and 18 MLRS.

In moving to and through the Battle of 73 Easting, 2nd ACR and the 1st Infantry division's lead brigades, which included Task Force 1-41, destroyed 160 tanks, 180 personnel carriers, 12 artillery pieces and more than 80 wheeled vehicles, along with several anti-aircraft artillery systems during the battle. A reconnaissance party from Battery C, 4-3 FA mistakenly moved well forward of the other Task Force 1-41 Infantry units. Task Force 3-66 Armor was given the assignment of looking for the lost reconnaissance party.

As Task Force 3-66 Armor approached the reconnaissance party, Iraqi infantry fired from fighting positions near the disoriented recon party. TF 3-66 M1A1 Abrams tanks and Bradley infantry fighting vehicles fought back with machine guns rather than cannons, to reduce the danger of hitting TF 1-41 IN, which stood just beyond the enemy. TF 3-66 AR machine gun fire drove the enemy right into TF 1-41 IN, with Hillman's troops capturing all of the enemy soldiers. TF 3-66 AR recovered the members of the lost reconnaissance party unharmed.

During the early stages of the Battle of Norfolk American artillery and MLRS units conducted fire missions against Iraqi targets a dozen miles to the east. 1st Infantry Division Artillery, including 4-3 FA battalion, was decisive during combat operations performing multiple raids and fire missions. These combat operations resulted in the destruction of 50 enemy tanks, 139 APCs, 30 air defense systems, 152 artillery pieces, 27 missile launchers, 108 mortars, and 548 wheeled vehicles, 61 trench lines and bunker positions, 92 dug in and open infantry targets, and 34 logistical sites. The 4-3 FA battalion fired a total of 2,339 rounds during all field artillery combat operations.

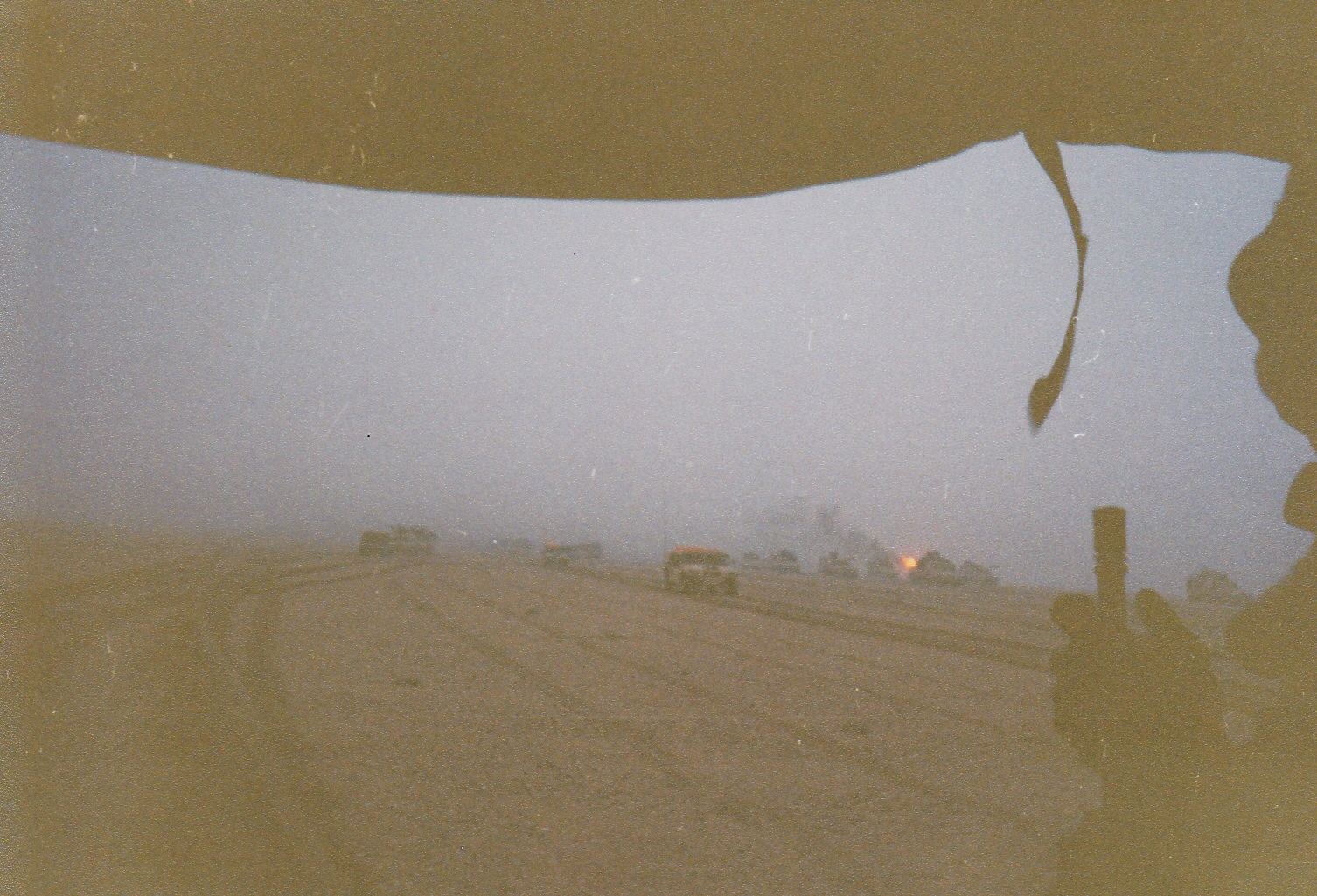
Elements of Battery C, 4th Battalion of the 3rd Field Artillery Regiment's Reconnaissance Team drive past a burning Iraqi tank. Other vehicles from 4-3 FA follow closely behind during the Battle of Norfolk during the 1st Gulf War, February 1991.

During the early stages of the battle two American Bradley Infantry Fighting Vehicles were destroyed by the Iraqi Republican Guard 18th Mechanized Brigade while conducting forward reconnaissance.

On 27 February 1991 Task Force 1-41 Infantry destroyed an Iraqi T-55 tank battalion that ambushed Battery C, 4-3 FA. The Iraqi tank unit was destroyed by a Task Force 1-41 tank platoon that was assigned to protect Battery C, 4-3 FA. The Iraqi tank unit managed to destroy a Bradley Fighting Vehicle and killed three soldiers belonging to the task force. On 27 February Task Force 1-41 Infantry also destroyed an Iraqi RPG team, machine gun nest, and a bunker.

On 27 February 1991 Task Force 1-41 destroyed another Iraqi tank unit at great range at Objective Denver. The 2nd Armored Division(Fwd) continued to fight a series of short, sharp battles with Iraqi tank platoons as it moved across the Wadi al-Batin into Kuwait. On 27 February 1991, the 2nd Armored Division (Forward) destroyed 60 Iraqi tanks and 35 infantry vehicles along the Iraq Pipeline to Saudi Arabia (IPSA).

Task Force 1-41 Infantry spent several hours engaging additional Iraqi infantry and armor units in a confusing melee that led to friendly fire incidents. Task Force 1-41 lost five Abrams tanks and two Bradley Fighting Vehicles during these engagements. Almost two dozen American soldiers were wounded.

The Task Force pulled back and 4-3 FA successfully engaged the remaining Iraqi Infantry units. Task Force 1-41 and other 2nd Armored Division(Fwd) units successfully secured the Iraq Pipeline to Saudi Arabia and captured a massive Iraqi logistics installation in the process. The Task Force and the 1st Infantry Division also cleared an extensive bunker complex which housed RPG equipped Iraqi infantry.

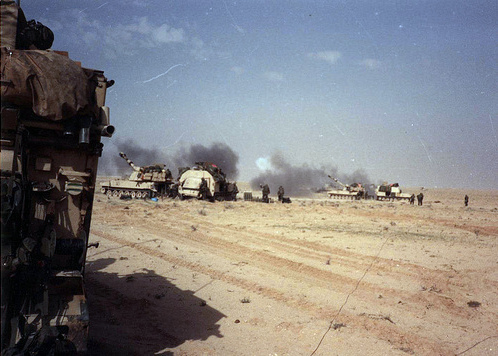
4th Battalion of the 3rd Field Artillery Regiment, 2nd Armored Division (FWD) conducts artillery strikes on Iraqi positions during the 1st Gulf War. 4-3 FA was the primary fire support battalion for Task Force 1-41 during the 1st Gulf War, February 1991.

In the thick of the fog of war, U.S. units became mixed with Iraqi units dispersed throughout the desert. This confusion led to some friendly fire incidents. Task Force 1-41 Infantry was involved in the worst US "friendly fire" incident of the Gulf War on 27 February 1991. Task Force 1-41 inflicted heavy losses on Iraqi forces and captured hundreds of Iraqi soldiers, including almost an entire Iraqi tank battalion on 27 February 1991.

Before the end of combat operations the Task Force engaged 11 Iraqi divisions. This included a significant role in the destruction of four Iraqi armored or mechanized brigades at the Battle of Norfolk. Task Force 1-41 Infantry captured over 300 enemy prisoners. The Task Force suffered 32 casualties and around a dozen combat vehicles were destroyed, including five M1A1 Abrams tanks, during combat operations. The Task Force traveled over 124 miles (200 km) in 72 hours during Operation Desert Storm. Task Force 1-41 Infantry earned a Valorous Unit Award for its efforts.

By the end of combat operations on 28 February 1991, U.S. VII Corps had driven 260 kilometers, captured 22,000 Iraqi soldiers, and destroyed 1,350 Iraqi tanks, 1,224 armored personnel carriers, 285 artillery pieces, 105 air defense systems, and 1,229 trucks.

== Valorous Unit Award citation ==
For extraordinary heroism in action against an armed enemy. Task Force 1-41 was the first coalition force to breach the Saudi Arabian border on 15 February 1991 and conduct ground combat operations in Iraq engaging in direct and indirect fire fights with the enemy on 17 February 1991. The Task Force was part of the VII Corps main attack beginning 24 February 1991 as it conducted a forward passage through 1st Infantry Division elements and began a mission to clear a zone which again resulted in enemy contact. On 26 February, following a 60 kilometer road march, the Task Force immediately engaged in ground combat with armored and dismounted enemy of brigade size. For six hours it was involved in continuous combat with a tenacious and determined enemy occupying extremely well prepared and heavily fortified bunkers. Task Force infantry elements dismounted and engaged the enemy in numerous short range fire fights while methodically clearing the extensive bunker complex. By morning the Task Force had systematically reduced the entrenched enemy positions in zone. Continuing as part of the VII Corps attack the Task Force travelled 85 kilometers in less than 24 hours while engaging at short range multiple, dug in enemy tanks in ambush positions. The Task Force reached its final objective 28 February 1991 with a push which continued the destruction of enemy armored vehicles. During the entire ground campaign, involving their attack through Iraq into Kuwait, Task Force 1-41 travelled over 200 Kilometers in 72 hours and destroyed 65 armored vehicles and 10 artillery pieces, while capturing over 300 enemy prisoners.

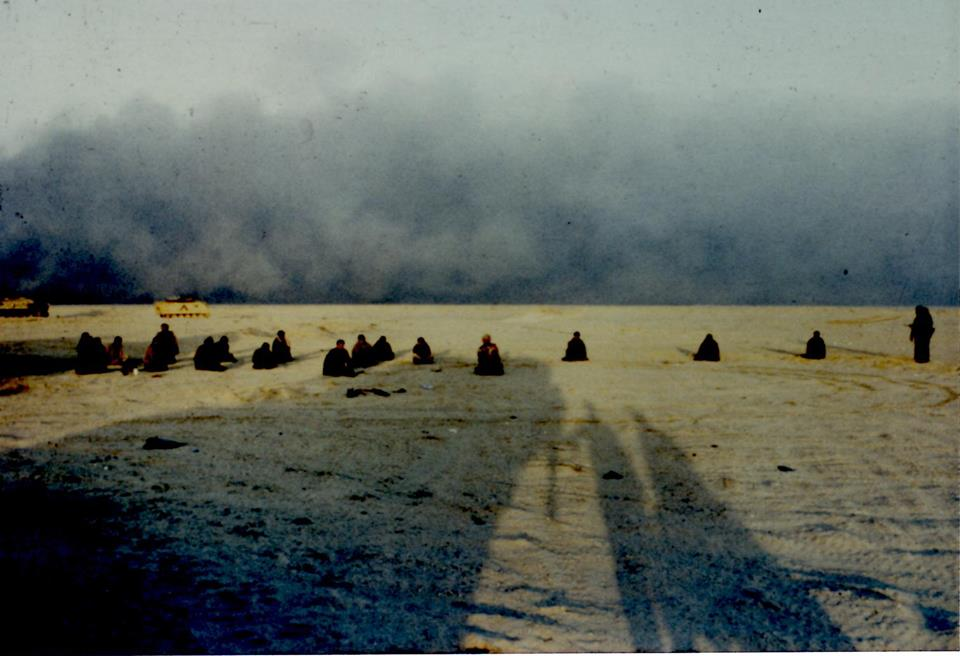
Iraqi soldiers surrender to Task Force 1-41 Infantry.

== See also ==
- History of the M1 Abrams
- Republican Guard (Iraq)
- Battle of Medina Ridge
- 2nd Armored Division (United States)
- Bradley Fighting Vehicle
- M109 howitzer
- BMP development

== Bibliography ==
- "Alpha 525 Gulf War Incident". YouTube.
- Department of the Army General Order 1991-20 (PDF). Washington, D.C.: US Army Center of Military History. 1991.
- "Desert Storm/Shield Valorous Unit Award Citations". Washington, D.C.: US Army Center of Military History. Archived from the original on 13 December 2014.
- Bourque, Stephen A. (2001). Jayhawk! The 7th Corps in the Persian Gulf War. Washington, D.C.: US Army Center of Military History. LCCN 2001028533. OCLC 51313637. Archived from the original on December 26, 2014.
- Bourque, Stephen A.; Burdan, John (2007). The Road to Safwan: The 1st Squadron, 4th Cavalry in the 1991 Persian Gulf War. Denton, Texas: University of North Texas Press. ISBN 9781574412321.
- Burns, Robert (12 November 1991). "Worst Friendly Fire Case Tied to Thermal Sights of Tanks". AP News Archive. Associated Press.
- Dinackus, Thomas D. (2000). Order of Battle: Allied Ground Forces of Operation Desert Storm. Central Point, Oregon: Hellgate Press. ISBN 1-55571-493-5.
- Hillman, James L. (1993). "Task Force 1-41 Infantry: The Fratricide Experience in Southwest Asia" (PDF). Carlisle Barracks, PA: US Army War College. OCLC 28169776. Archived (PDF) from the original on December 26, 2014.
- Houlahan, Thomas (1999). Gulf War: The Complete History. New London, NH: Schrenker Military Publishing. ISBN 9780966845600.
- Scales, Robert H. (1993). Certain Victory: The U.S. Army in the Gulf War (PDF). Fort Leavenworth: U.S. Army Command and General Staff College Press. OCLC 78302979. Archived from the original (PDF) on September 17, 2012.
- Westwell, Ian (2001). 1st Infantry Division 'Big Red One'. Spearhead #6. Hersham, Surrey: Ian Allan. ISBN 9780711029231.
- Zaloga, Steven J. (2009). M1 Abrams vs T-72 Ural: Operation Desert Storm 1991. Oxford, NY: Osprey. ISBN 9781846034077.
- The First Infantry Division and the U.S. Army Transformed: Road to Victory in Desert Storm, 1970-1991 by Gregory Fontenot
- Desert Redleg: Artillery Warfare in the First Gulf War by Col. L. Scott Lingamfelter
