= Operation Dezful =

1980 Iran–Iraq War operation

Coordinates: 32.3833°N 48.4667°E

- Part of Iran–Iraq War
- Location of the city of Dezful, Iran
Date	October 15, 1980
Location	Dezful, southwest Iran
Result	Iraqi victory: Although Iranian counter-attack is defeated it succeeds in halting elements of the Iraqi advance causing the Iraqis to reconsider their plan; Iraqis scout the surroundings but refrain from entering and occupying the weakly defended city; Iraqis choose to remain entrenched in more easily defensible positions on the west bank of Dez river from where they maintain the siege of Dezful

Belligerents
Iraq	Iran

Commanders and leaders
(Ba'athist Iraq)	(Iran)

Strength
	3,000–4,000 infantry 100 tanks

Casualties and losses
Light	400 KIA; 136 combat vehicles 84 tanks destroyed

Operation Dezful was fought in early stage of the Iran–Iraq War on 15 October 1980 as Iranian tank brigades from the 16th Qazvin, 77th Khorasan, and 92nd Khuzestan armoured divisions attacked Iraqi positions. The Iranian Army's aim was to stop Iraqis progress in Iranian territories and to push them back. However, Iraqi forces counterattacked from the flanks, and repulsed the Iranian forces. The Iranian failure was blamed on poor decision making, the purge of army commanders due to their participation in Nojeh coup plot, and underestimating fire power of Iraqi forces and they were forced to retreat to the eastern shores of Dez River west of Dezful.

== Repelling an Iranian counterattack in the Dezful sector ==
After the first week of fighting the Iraqis found themselves a number of kilometers from the city of Dezful, which served as an important logistics center for the Iranian forces in Khuzestan Province and was also a key industrial area. For this reason, extensive fortifications had been built around it in the period of the Shah's rule. The Iraqis avoided entering the city and settled for artillery fire aimed at important local infrastructure. The Iranians on their part did not sit idly by, and within a short space of time managed to organize their forces in the sector. They mounted a counterattack on 14–16 October on the northern flank of the Iraqi 10th Division by an armored brigade of the Iranian 92nd Division (about 100 tanks) and an infantry brigade reinforced by the Revolutionary Guards (3000-4000 soldiers and volunteers), with the aim of forcing the Iraqis to withdraw form the sector.

The Iraqi 42nd Armored Brigade, against which the counterattack was directed, withdrew in an organized fashion to the territory which it had full control over, and from there concentrated its fire on the killing area that the Iranians had entered. In addition, the Iraqis sent in a force of the 24th Mechanized Brigade equipped with BMP-1 AFVs armed with A/T Sagger missiles which did much damage to the Iranian armored force at a close range of 100–150 meters.

The Iranian attack, which had figured prominently in deliberations being held in the Iranian parliament in Tehran concerning the direction of the war, ended in a resounding defeat, causing the Iranians to abandon 136 armored combat vehicles, including 84 tanks, on the battlefield. This was one of the most important armored battles fought in that sector since the outbreak of the war.
