= Battle of Norfolk =

Tank battle in the Gulf War

- Part of the Persian Gulf War
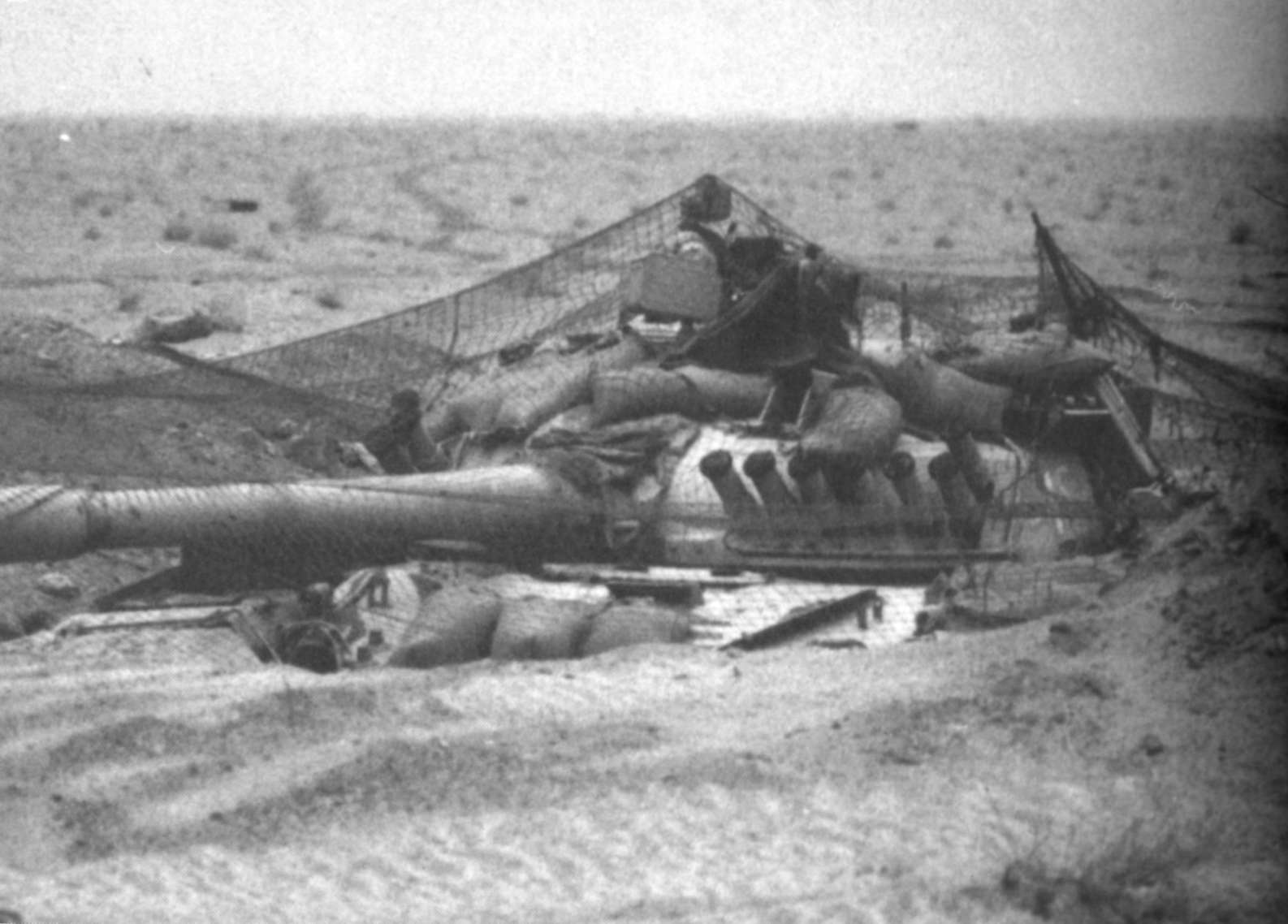
- A dug-in Iraqi T-72 Asad Babil tank at the Battle of Norfolk, 26 February 1991
Date	27–28 February 1991 (1 day)
Location	Al Muthanna Governorate, Iraq
Result	Coalition victory

Belligerents
(United Nations) Coalition; United States; United Kingdom	Ba'athist Iraq

Commanders and leaders
(United States) Norman Schwarzkopf (United States) Frederick Franks (United States) Thomas G. Rhame (United Kingdom) Rupert Smith	(Iraq) Salah Aboud Mahmoud (Iraq) Gen. Ayad Futayih al-Rawi (Iraq) Brig-Gen. Saheb Mohammed Alaw (Iraq) Brig-Gen. Bassil Omar Al-Shalham

Units involved
(United States) VII Corps: (United States) 1st Infantry Division; (United States) 1st Cavalry Division; (United Kingdom) 1st Armoured Division; (United States) 2nd Armored Division(Fwd); 3rd Armored Division (United States); (United States) 210th Field Artillery Brigade; (United States) 4th Cavalry Regiment; 1st Squadron	(Iraq) Tawakalna Division (Iraq) 10th Armored Division (Iraq) 12th Armored Division (Iraq) 17th Armored Division (Iraq) 52nd Armored Division (Iraq) 25th Infantry Division (Iraq) 26th Infantry Division (Iraq) 31st Infantry Division (Iraq) 48th Infantry Division (Iraq) 9th Armored Brigade (Iraq) 18th Mechanized Brigade (Iraq) 50th Armored Brigade (Iraq) 29th Armored Brigade (Iraq) 110th Infantry Brigade (Iraq) 11th Mechanized Brigade (Iraq) 80th Armored Brigade

Casualties and losses
American Sector: 21 killed 67 wounded 5 tanks destroyed 4– 5 IFVs destroyed Objective Dorset: 15 killed 27 wounded 3 tanks damaged British Sector: 15 killed 43 wounded 2 IFVs destroyed	American Sector: Heavy casualties 11,500 captured 550 tanks destroyed 480 armoured vehicles destroyed 396 artillery pieces destroyed Objective Dorset: Heavy casualties 2,500 captured 300 tanks & IFVs destroyed British Sector; Heavy casualties 7,000+ captured 300 tanks destroyed & captured Heavy IFV losses Heavy artillery losses

The Battle of Norfolk was a tank battle fought on February 27, 1991, during the Persian Gulf War, between armored forces of the United States and United Kingdom, and those of the Iraqi Republican Guard in the Muthanna Province of southern Iraq. The primary participants were the U.S. 2nd Armored Division (Forward), 1st Infantry Division (Mechanized), and the Iraqi 18th Mechanized and 9th Armoured Brigades of the Republican Guard Tawakalna Mechanized Infantry Division along with elements from eleven other Iraqi divisions.

The 2nd Armored Division (Forward) was assigned to the American 1st Infantry Division as its 3rd maneuver brigade because one of its brigades was not deployed. The 2nd Armored Division (Forward)'s Task Force 1-41 Infantry was the spearhead of VII Corps. The British 1st Armoured division was responsible for protecting the right flank of VII Corps, their main adversary being the Iraqi 52nd Armored Division and multiple infantry divisions. It was the final battle of the war before the unilateral ceasefire took effect.

The Battle of Norfolk has been recognized as the second largest tank battle in American history and the largest tank battle of the 1st Gulf War. 13 divisions participated in the Battle of Norfolk along with multiple heavy armored brigades and elements of a regiment. American and British forces destroyed approximately 850 Iraqi tanks and hundreds of other types of combat vehicles. Two additional Republican Guard divisions were destroyed at Objective Dorset by the U.S. 3rd Armored Division on 28 February 1991. During this battle the U.S. 3rd Armored Division destroyed an additional 300 enemy vehicles and captured 2,500 Iraqi soldiers.

== Overview ==
The battle took place about 60 miles (97 km) east of and 18 hours after the Battle of Al Busayyah, and several kilometers east of the Battle of 73 Easting, which had ended just two hours earlier. The Battle of Norfolk is named for Objective Norfolk, an area that encompassed the intersection of the IPSA Pipeline Road and several desert trails and a large Iraqi supply depot defended by Iraqi armor.

Objective Norfolk was located west of Phase Line Kiwi, east of Phase Line Smash, and north of Phase Line Grape. Phase lines are map references occurring every few kilometers used to measure progress of an offensive operation.

== Participants ==
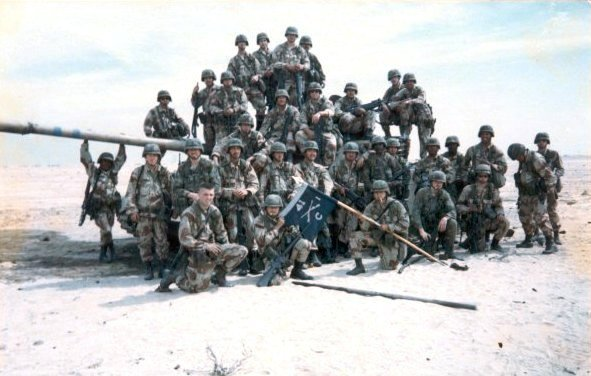
Soldiers of 2nd Platoon, Company C, 1st Battalion, 41st Infantry Regiment, Task Force 1-41 Infantry pose with a captured Iraqi tank during the 1st Gulf War, February 1991.

The U.S. Army's VII Corps was a formidable fighting force. In its inventory were 1,487 tanks, 1,384 infantry fighting vehicles (IFV), 568 artillery pieces, 132 multiple-launch rocket systems (MLRS), 8 missile launchers, and 242 attack helicopters. It had a total troop strength of 146,321 troops. The primary forces involved in the battle were the American 1st Infantry Division, the 3rd Brigade of the 2nd Armored Division (Fwd) ('Hell on Wheels') and the Iraqi 18th Mechanized and 9th Armoured Brigades of the Republican Guard Tawakalna Mechanized Infantry Division along with elements from eleven other Iraqi divisions including the Iraqi 26th, 48th, 31st, and 25th Infantry Divisions. The American 1st Infantry Division was quite formidable consisting of 334 M1A1 tanks and 224 M2A2 Bradley fighting vehicles. Task Force 1-41 Infantry of the U.S. 2nd Armored Division (Fwd) would spearhead the U.S. 1st Infantry Division and the rest of VII Corps throughout the war. The U.S. 1st Cavalry Division was also a participant.

The British fielded their 1st Armoured Division. The U.S. 3rd Armored Division handled responsibilities at Objective Dorset. At the height of the battle, the 3rd Armored Division included 32 battalions and 20,533 personnel. The 3rd Armored Division was the largest coalition division in the Gulf War and the largest U.S. armored division in history. Its equipment included 360 Abrams main battle tanks, 340 Bradley Fighting Vehicles, 128 self-propelled 155 mm howitzers, 27 McDonnell-Douglas AH-64 Apache attack helicopters, 9 M270 multiple-launch rocket systems, and additional equipment.

The Iraqi 52nd Armored Division was also a primary participant. It was a powerful division consisting of 245 tanks and 195 armored fighting vehicles. The Iraqi 10th and 12th Armored Divisions were also present. The Iraqi 10th Armored Division was considered the best regular division in the Iraqi Army. It had more modern equipment than the other regular Iraqi units. It was equipped with T-72 and T-62 tanks. The T-62 tank being its primary system.

The primary tank of the Iraqi forces was the T-55 tank. The Iraqis fielded them in great numbers. The Iraqis also had elements of two other independent armored brigades in theater, those being the 50th and 29th Armored Brigades.

The three primary elite Iraqi Republican Guard Divisions Tawakalna, Hammurabi, and the Medina Division had a strength of over 660 tanks, 660 infantry fighting vehicles, and thousands of antitank weapons, self propelled artillery, and other combat systems. The Tawakalna Republican Guard Division was Iraq's most powerful division which included approximately 14,000 soldiers, 220 T-72 tanks, 284 infantry fighting vehicles, 126 artillery pieces, and 18 MLRS.

== Counter reconnaissance ==
Task Force 1-41 Infantry was the first coalition force to breach the Saudi Arabian border on 15 February 1991 and conduct ground combat operations in Iraq engaging in direct and indirect fire fights with the enemy on 17 February 1991. Task Force 1-41 Infantry was a heavy battalion task force from the 2nd Armored Division (Forward). It consisted primarily of the 1st Battalion, 41st Infantry Regiment, 3rd Battalion, 66th Armor Regiment, and the 4th Battalion, 3rd Field Artillery Regiment. Shortly after arrival in theater Task Force 1-41 Infantry received a counter-reconnaissance mission along with the 1st Squadron, 4th Cavalry Regiment.

This joint effort became known as Task Force Iron. Counter-reconnaissance generally includes destroying or repelling the enemy's reconnaissance elements and denying their commander any observation of friendly forces. On 15 February 1991 4th Battalion of the 3rd Field Artillery Regiment fired on a trailer and a few trucks in the Iraqi sector that were observing American forces. On 16 February 1991 several groups of Iraqi vehicles appeared to be performing reconnaissance on the Task Force and were driven away by fire from 4-3 FA.

Another enemy platoon, including six vehicles, was reported as being to the northeast of the Task Force. They were engaged with artillery fire from 4-3 FA. Later that evening another group of Iraqi vehicles was spotted moving towards the center of the Task Force. They appeared to be Iraqi Soviet-made BTRs and tanks.

For the next hour the Task Force fought several small battles with Iraqi reconnaissance units. TF 1-41 IN fired TOW missiles at the Iraqi formation, destroying one tank. The rest of the formation was destroyed or driven away by artillery fire from 4-3 FA. On 17 February 1991, the Task Force took enemy mortar fire, however, the enemy forces managed to escape. Later that evening the Task Force received enemy artillery fire but suffered no casualties.

On 18 February Iraqi mortar positions continued to conduct fire missions against the Task Force. The Task Force returned fire on the Iraqi positions with artillery fire from 4-3 FA Battalion and 1st Infantry Division Artillery. During the Iraqi mortar attacks two American soldiers were wounded. Iraqi reconnaissance elements continued to patrol the area between the Task Force and the 1st Cavalry Division. VII Corps air units and artillery conducted combat operations against Iraqi defensive positions.

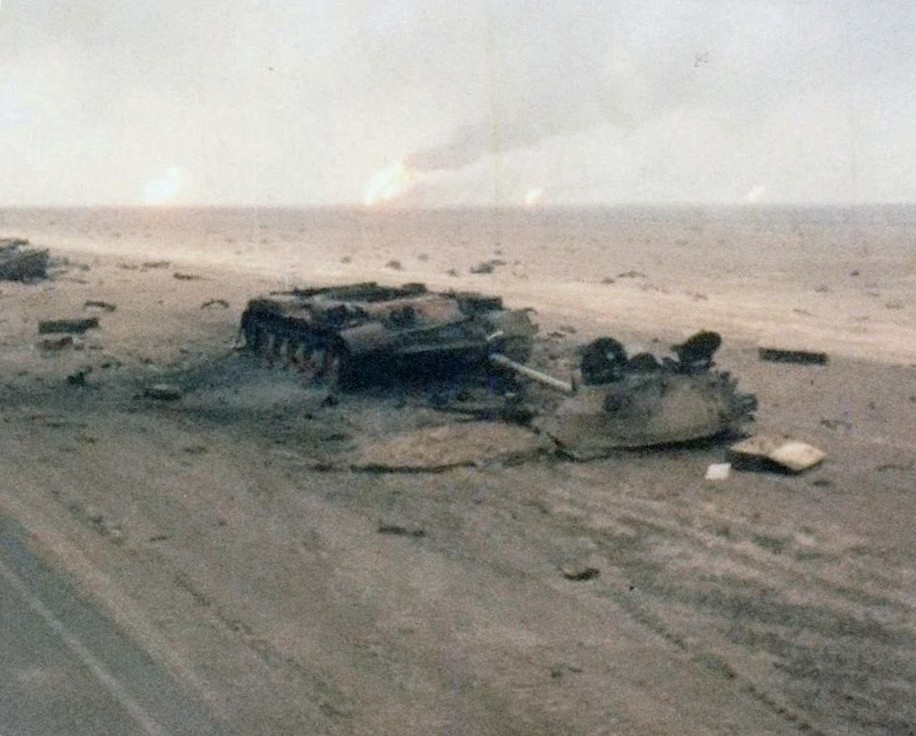
Iraqi tanks destroyed by Task Force 1-41 Infantry during the 1st Gulf War, February 1991.

== Breach ==
The breach was preceded by a heavy artillery barrage, led by VII Corps artillery units to soften up Iraqi VII Corps defenses. Around 300 guns from multiple nations participated in the barrage. Over 14,000 rounds of artillery and over 4,900 M270 MLRS rockets were fired at Iraqi VII Corps forces during these raids. Iraq lost close to 22 artillery battalions during the initial stages of this barrage. This includes the destruction of approximately 396 Iraqi artillery pieces. By the end of these raids Iraqi artillery assets had all but ceased to exist. One Iraqi unit that was totally destroyed during the preparation was the Iraqi 48th Infantry Division Artillery Group. The group's commander stated his unit lost 83 of its 100 guns to the artillery preparation. These raids were supplemented by air attacks by B-52 Stratofortress bombers and Lockheed AC-130 fixed wing gunships. 1st Infantry Division Apache helicopters and B-52 bombers conducted raids against Iraq's 110th Infantry Brigade. The 1st Engineer Battalion and 9th Engineer Battalion marked and proofed assault lanes under direct and indirect enemy fire to secure a foothold in enemy territory and pass the 1st Infantry Division and the British 1st Armoured Division forward. 1st Infantry Division Artillery made a significant contribution to the battle. They would fire 11,752 rounds of the 45,641 rounds fired during all artillery missions during the conflict. 1-5 FA would contribute 5,313 rounds. 4-5 FA contributed 4,100 rounds and 4-3 FA would fire 2,339 rounds during all artillery missions during the Gulf War. These three battalions would be the most active of all 28 of the 155mm battalions present in theatre. On 20 February 1991 4-3 FA along with 2-29 FA, C 1-17 FA(MLRS), A 1-158 FA(MLRS), and A 6-27 FA(MLRS) participated in an artillery raid against multiple Iraqi targets. This raid led to the destruction of multiple Iraqi artillery and armor units along with multiple command posts. On 23 February 1991 4-3 FA along with 1-17 FA, 1-142 FA, 2-142 FA, and 1-27 FA participated in another successful artillery raid. This raid led to the destruction of additional Iraqi artillery assets, maneuver, command, and logistics targets. 1st Infantry Division Artillery and AH-64 Apache attack helicopters conducted operations against the Iraqi 26th Infantry Division. B-52 bombers conducted missions against the Iraqi 48th Infantry Division.

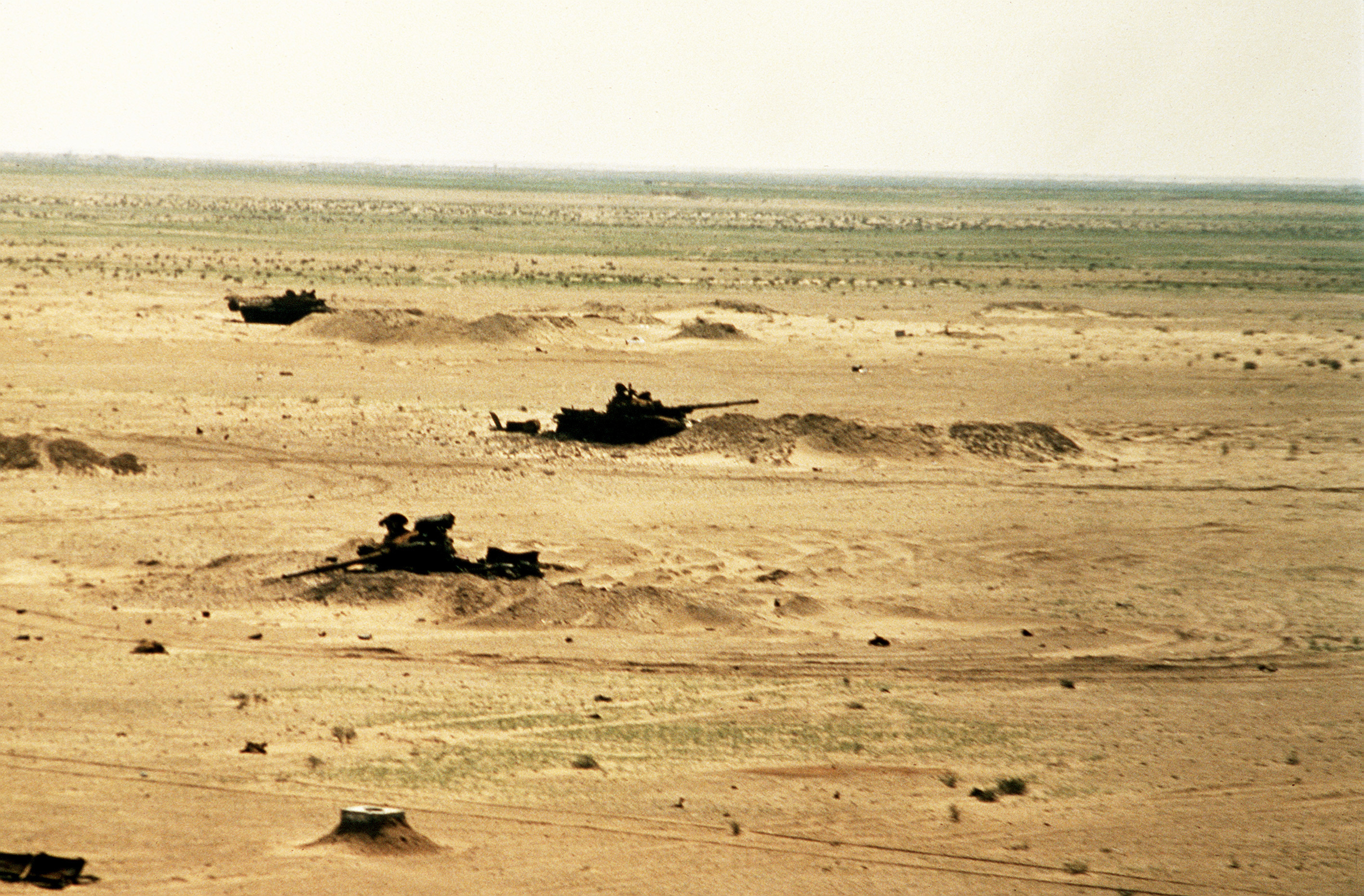
Task Force 1-41 Infantry destroyed multiple Iraqi tanks in defensive entrenchments.

On 24 February 1991 the 1st Cavalry Division conducted a couple artillery missions against Iraqi artillery units. One artillery mission struck a series of Iraqi bunkers, reinforced by Iraqi T-55 tanks, in the sector of the Iraqi 25th Infantry Division. The same day the 2nd Brigade, 1st Cavalry Division with the 1st Battalion, 5th Cavalry, 1st Battalion, 32nd Armor, and the 1st Battalion, 8th Cavalry destroyed Iraqi bunkers and combat vehicles in the sector of the Iraqi 25th Infantry Division. On 24 February 1991 2nd Brigade, 1st Infantry Division rolled through the breach in the Iraqi defense west of Wadi al-Batin and also cleared the northeastern sector of the breach site of enemy resistance. Task Force 3-37th Armor breached the Iraqi defense clearing four passage lanes and expanding the gap under direct enemy fire.

Also, on 24 February the American 1st Infantry Division along with the 1st Cavalry Division destroyed Iraqi outposts and patrols belonging to the Iraqi 26th Infantry Division. The two divisions also began capturing prisoners. The 1st Infantry Division also cleared a zone between Phase Line Vermont and Phase Line Kansas. Once the 1st Infantry Division's 3rd Battalion, 37th Armor reached the Iraqi rear defensive positions it destroyed an Iraqi D-30 artillery battery and many trucks and bunkers.

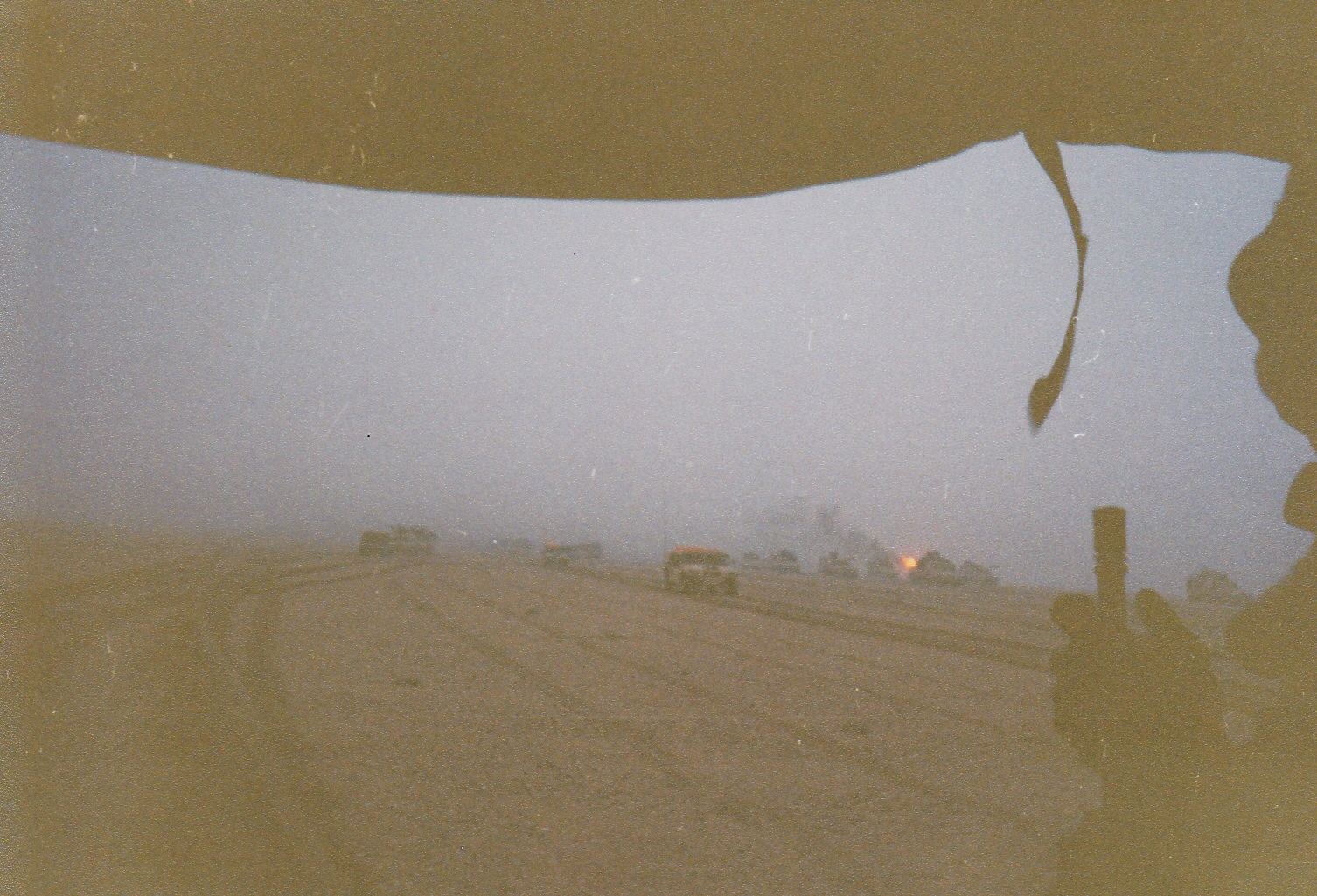
Elements of Battery C, 4th Battalion of the 3rd Field Artillery Regiment's Reconnaissance Team drive past a burning Iraqi tank. Vehicles from 4-3 FA follow closely behind during the Battle of Norfolk during the 1st Gulf War, February 1991.

=== Task Force 1-41 ===
Task Force 1-41 Infantry was given the task of breaching Iraq's initial defensive positions along the Iraq-Saudi Arabia border. The 1st Squadron, 4th Armored Cavalry Regiment handled similar responsibilities in its sector of operations. The 1st Infantry Division's 5th Battalion, 16th Infantry also played a significant role clearing the trenches and captured 160 Iraqi soldiers in the process. Once into Iraqi territory Task Force 1-41 Infantry encountered multiple Iraqi defensive positions and bunkers. These defensive positions were occupied by a brigade-sized element.

Task Force 1-41 Infantry elements dismounted and prepared to engage the enemy soldiers which occupied these well-prepared and heavily fortified bunkers. The Task Force found itself engaged in six hours of combat in order to clear the extensive bunker complex. The Iraqis engaged the Task Force with small arms fire, RPGs, mortar fire, and what was left of Iraqi artillery assets. A series of battles unfolded which resulted in heavy Iraqi casualties and the Iraqis being removed from their defensive positions with many becoming prisoners of war. Some escaped to be killed or captured by other coalition forces. In the process of clearing the bunkers Task Force 1-41 captured two brigade command posts and the command post of the Iraqi 26th Infantry Division.

The Task Force also captured a brigade commander, several battalion commanders, company commanders, and staff officers. As combat operations progressed Task Force 1-41 Infantry engaged at short range multiple dug in enemy tanks in ambush positions. For a few hours, bypassed Iraqi RPG equipped anti-tank teams, T-55 tanks, and dismounted Iraqi infantry fired at passing American vehicles, only to be destroyed by other US tanks and fighting vehicles following the initial forces.

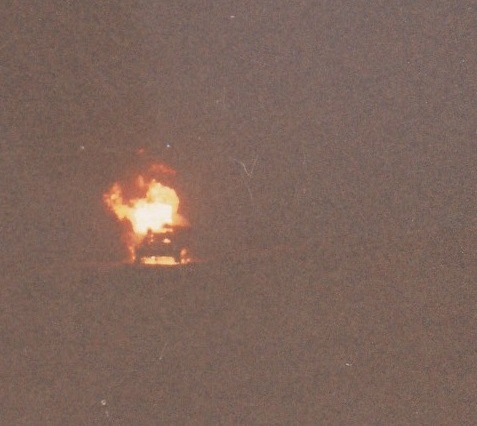
An Iraqi tank destroyed by Task Force 1-41 Infantry during a night combat operation during the Gulf war, February 1991.

The 1st Infantry Division's Task Force 2-16 Infantry cleared four lanes simultaneously through an enemy fortified trench system while inflicting heavy casualties. Task Force 2-16 continued the attack clearing over 13 miles of entrenched enemy positions resulting in the capture and destruction of numerous enemy vehicles, equipment, personnel and command bunkers.

== Battle ==
For three and a half hours 90,000 artillery rounds were fired on Iraqi defensive positions preceding the major ground assault.

On 22 February and 23 February 1st Infantry Division artillery and 4-3 FA Battalion conducted artillery raids against Iraqi targets.

Early morning on 23 February the 1st Cavalry Division also conducted artillery raids and reconnaissance operations along the border berm.

Also, on 23 February the 210th Field Artillery Brigade conducted fire missions at Iraqi targets across the berm. On 23 February the 1st Infantry Division conducted Apache helicopter raids against the Iraqi 110th Infantry Brigade.

On 24 February 1991 Task Force 1-41 Infantry was engaged by Iraqi infantry units armed with RPGs. The Iraqi soldiers were either killed or captured. Later that same day 4-3 FA conducted artillery strikes to the north of its position against Iraqi positions. The Iraqis engaged Task Force 1–41 with artillery and mortar fire with little success. That same day the Task Force along with other American units continued clearing Phase Line New Jersey.

Later on 24 February 1991 Task Force 1-41 would have a hand in the destruction of the Iraqi 110th and 434th Infantry Brigades of the Iraqi 26th Infantry Division.

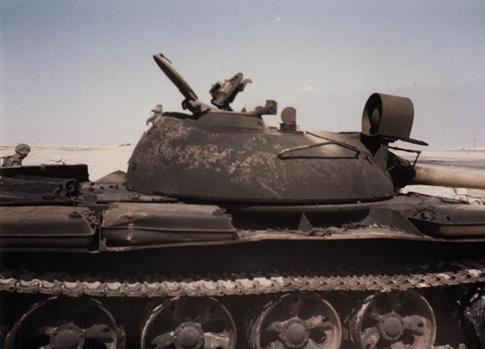
An Iraqi Republican Guard T-55 tank destroyed by Task Force 1-41 Infantry during the 1st Gulf War, February 1991.

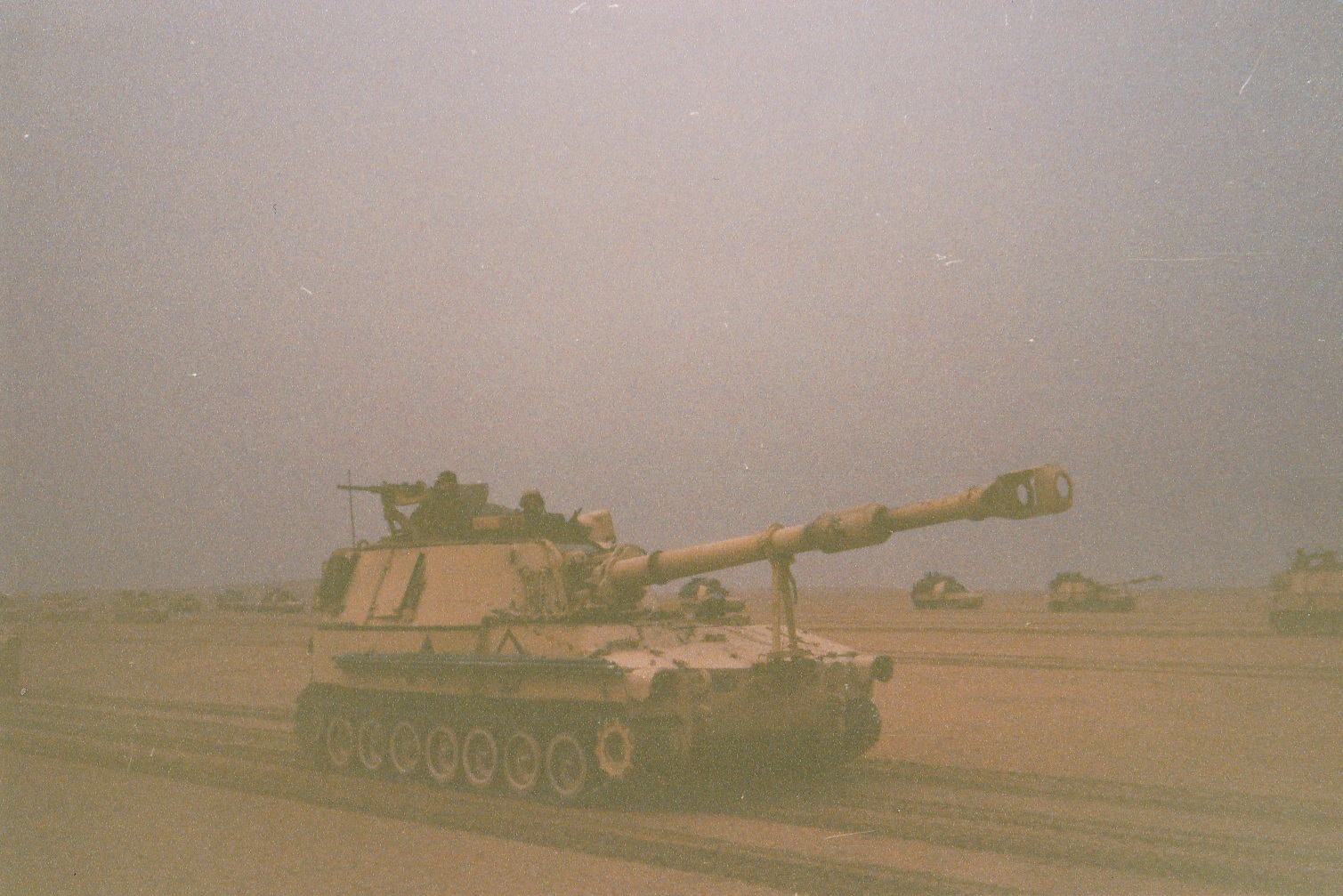
Battery C, 4th Battalion of the 3rd Field Artillery Regiment, 2nd Armored Division (FWD) moves into position to conduct fire missions during the Battle of Norfolk, February 1991.

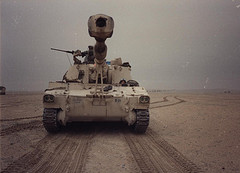
A M109A2 self-propelled howitzer, belonging to 4-3 FA Battalion, prepares to move into position to engage Iraqi forces, February 1991. 4-3 FA Battalion conducted numerous fire missions and artillery raids during the 1st Gulf War.

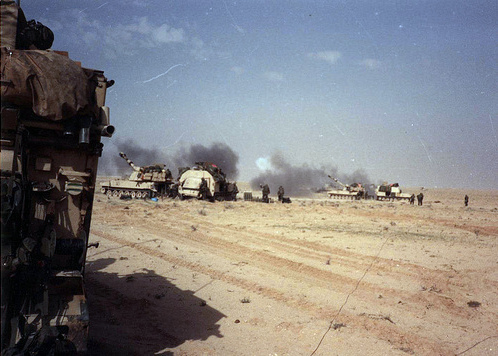
The 4th Battalion of the 3rd Field Artillery Regiment, 2nd Armored Division (FWD) conducts artillery strikes on Iraqi positions during the 1st Gulf War. 4-3 FA was the primary fire support battalion for Task Force 1-41 during the 1st Gulf War, February 1991.

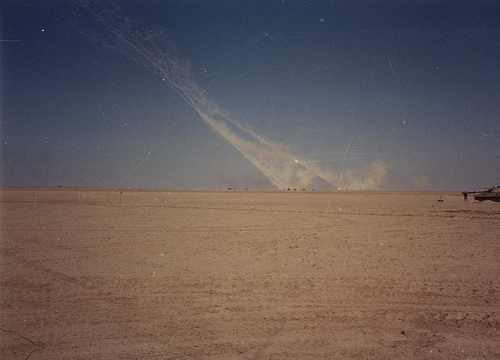
M270 Multiple Launch Rocket Systems attack Iraqi positions at the Battle of Norfolk during the 1st Gulf War, February 1991.

On 25 February 1991 Task Force 1-41 Infantry engaged and destroyed the Iraqi Jihad Corps, which consisted of the 10th and 12th Armored Divisions, in direct combat. It also engaged the heavy divisions of the Republican Guard Forces Command. This formation had an arsenal of 660 tanks and another 660 combat vehicles.

On 26 February 1991 Task Force 1-41 Infantry, led by 3-66 Armor Battalion, engaged and destroyed an Iraqi T-55 tank battalion.

The Battle of Norfolk was in a sense a continuation of the fighting that began with the Battle of 73 Easting. It took place under rainy and foggy weather conditions. It began at 0030 on 27 February 1991. During the early stages 1st Infantry Division Artillery, including 4-3 FA battalion, was decisive during combat operations performing multiple raids and fire missions. These combat operations resulted in the destruction of 50 enemy tanks, 139 APCs, 30 air defense systems, 152 artillery pieces, 27 missile launchers, 108 mortars, and 548 wheeled vehicles, 61 trench lines and bunker positions, 92 dug in and open infantry targets, and 34 logistical sites. Two American Bradley Infantry Fighting Vehicles were destroyed by the Iraqi Republican Guard 18th Mechanized Brigade while conducting forward reconnaissance. American artillery and MLRS units continued to conduct fire missions against Iraqi targets a dozen miles to the east. With air support from the 2nd Battalion, 1st Aviation's attack helicopters and fire support from both the 4th Battalion of the 3rd Field Artillery Regiment and the rest of 1st Infantry Division artillery preventing Iraqi artillery from interfering, the U.S. 1st Infantry Division conducted a passage of the 2nd ACR's lines.

The two attacking brigades of the U.S. 1st Infantry Division, including the 3rd Brigade of the 2nd Armored Division (Fwd), were positioned along the 75 Easting, 2,000 meters east of 73 Easting. The Brigades clashed with the Iraqi Tawakalna Division of the Republican Guard, including the 37th Brigade of the 12th Iraqi Armored Division. The 1st Infantry Division's two lead Brigades also clashed with the Iraqi 9th Armored Brigade and 18th Mechanized Brigade in the early stages of the battle. 1st Battalion, 1st Aviation's attack helicopters also participated in these initial battles. Elements of the Iraqi 12th Armored Division were destroyed during this engagement by Task Force 1-41 Infantry. This was a slow moving division that was significantly outmatched by U.S. and British forces. Some 40 Iraqi tanks were destroyed and a similar number of other combat vehicles.

A reconnaissance party from 4-3 FA mistakenly moved well forward of the other Task Force 1-41 Infantry units. Task Force 3-66 Armor was given the assignment of looking for the lost reconnaissance party. As Task Force 3-66 Armor approached the reconnaissance party, enemy infantry foolishly took it under fire from fighting positions near the disoriented 4-3 FA recon party. TF 3-66 M1A1 Abrams tanks and Bradley infantry fighting vehicles fought back with only machine guns rather than cannons to reduce the danger of hitting TF 1-41 IN, which stood just beyond the enemy. TF 3-66 AR machine gun fire drove the enemy right into TF 1-41 IN with Hillman's troops capturing all of the enemy soldiers. TF 3-66 AR recovered the members of the lost reconnaissance party unharmed.

On 27 February 1991 Task Force 1-41 Infantry destroyed an Iraqi T-55 tank battalion that ambushed the Task Force. The Iraqi tank unit managed to destroy a Bradley Fighting Vehicle and killed three soldiers belonging to the Task Force. That same day Task Force 1-41 destroyed an Iraqi RPG team, machine gun nest, and a bunker.

On 27 February 1991 Task Force 1-41 destroyed another Iraqi tank unit at great range at Objective Denver. The 2nd Armored Division (Forward) destroyed 60 Iraqi tanks and 35 AFVs along the Iraq Pipeline to Saudi Arabia (IPSA). Task Force 1-41 and other 2nd Armored Division(Fwd) units successfully secured the Iraq Pipeline to Saudi Arabia and capture a massive Iraqi logistics installation in the process. The Task Force and the 1st Infantry Division also cleared an extensive bunker complex which housed RPG equipped Iraqi infantry.

In the thick of the fog of war, U.S. units became mixed with Iraqi units dispersed throughout the desert. This confusion led to some friendly fire incidents. Task Force 1-41 Infantry was involved in the worst US "friendly fire" incident of the Gulf War on 27 February 1991.

The 2nd Armored Division(Fwd) continued to fight a series of short, sharp battles with Iraqi tank platoons as it moved across the Wadi al-Batin into Kuwait. On 27 February 1991 an Iraqi tank unit attacked 4-3 FA. The Iraqi tank unit was destroyed by a Task Force 1-41 tank platoon that was assigned to protect 4-3 FA.

Task Force 1-41 captured almost an entire Iraqi tank battalion on 27 February 1991.

The 1st Engineer Battalion was a key participant in the subsequent destruction of one and the rout of two Iraqi Republican Guard Divisions. Elements of the battalion destroyed 58 Iraqi tanks, 41 anti-aircraft artillery pieces, and other large quantities of ammunition and war material.

The 1st Infantry Division's Task Force 2nd Battalion, 16th Infantry destroyed elements of the Iraqi 48th Infantry Division. The 1st Infantry Division's Task Force 2nd Battalion, 34th Armor destroyed the 9th Armored Brigade of the Tawakalna Division of the Republican Guard.

The 1st Squadron, 4th Armored Cavalry Regiment led the 1st Infantry Division's attack across Iraq and Kuwait, cutting the Iraqi army's escape route along the Kuwait City/Basra Highway. The Squadron continued its rapid advance, culminating with the capture of the Safwan Airfield, Iraq. The 1st Squadron, 4th Armored Cavalry Regiment destroyed 65 tanks, 66 Armored Personnel Carriers, 66 trucks, 91 bunkers, and captured 3,010 enemy soldiers.

As part of the 1st Infantry Division, Task Force 3-37 Armor attacked 186 miles across southern Iraq into northern Kuwait, severing Iraqi lines of communication, and then drove north into Iraq to assist in the seizure of the City of Safwan, Iraq, and the securing of the Safwan Airfield for the Coalition Forces-Iraqi Cease-Fire negotiations. During the operation, over 50 enemy combat vehicles were destroyed and over 1,700 Iraqi soldiers were captured.

During the battle, the 4th Battalion, 37th Armor, 2nd Brigade, 1st Infantry Division engaged elements of five Iraqi Divisions, destroyed numerous combat vehicles and captured over 450 enemy soldiers, ensuring an unprecedented victory for Coalition Forces.

By dawn, the U.S. 1st Infantry Division controlled Objective Norfolk and the Tawakalna Mechanized Infantry Division had ceased to exist as a fighting force. A total of eight Iraqi divisions were destroyed. Task Force 1-41 Infantry had around a dozen combat vehicles destroyed, including multiple M1A1 Abrams tanks, during combat operations. The 2nd Armored Division(Fwd) and the 1st Infantry Division destroyed 550 Iraqi tanks and 480 other armored vehicles during combat operations.

Approximately 11,500 Iraqi soldiers surrendered to the 1st Infantry Division by the end of combat operations. The 2nd Armored Division(Fwd) suffered 5 M1A1 Abrams tanks destroyed or damaged during combat operations. It also suffered the loss of 5 Bradley Infantry Fighting Vehicles. The 1st Infantry Division, including the 2nd Armored Division(Fwd), suffered 21 soldiers killed in action and another 67 soldiers wounded in action by the end of combat operations.

== British contribution ==
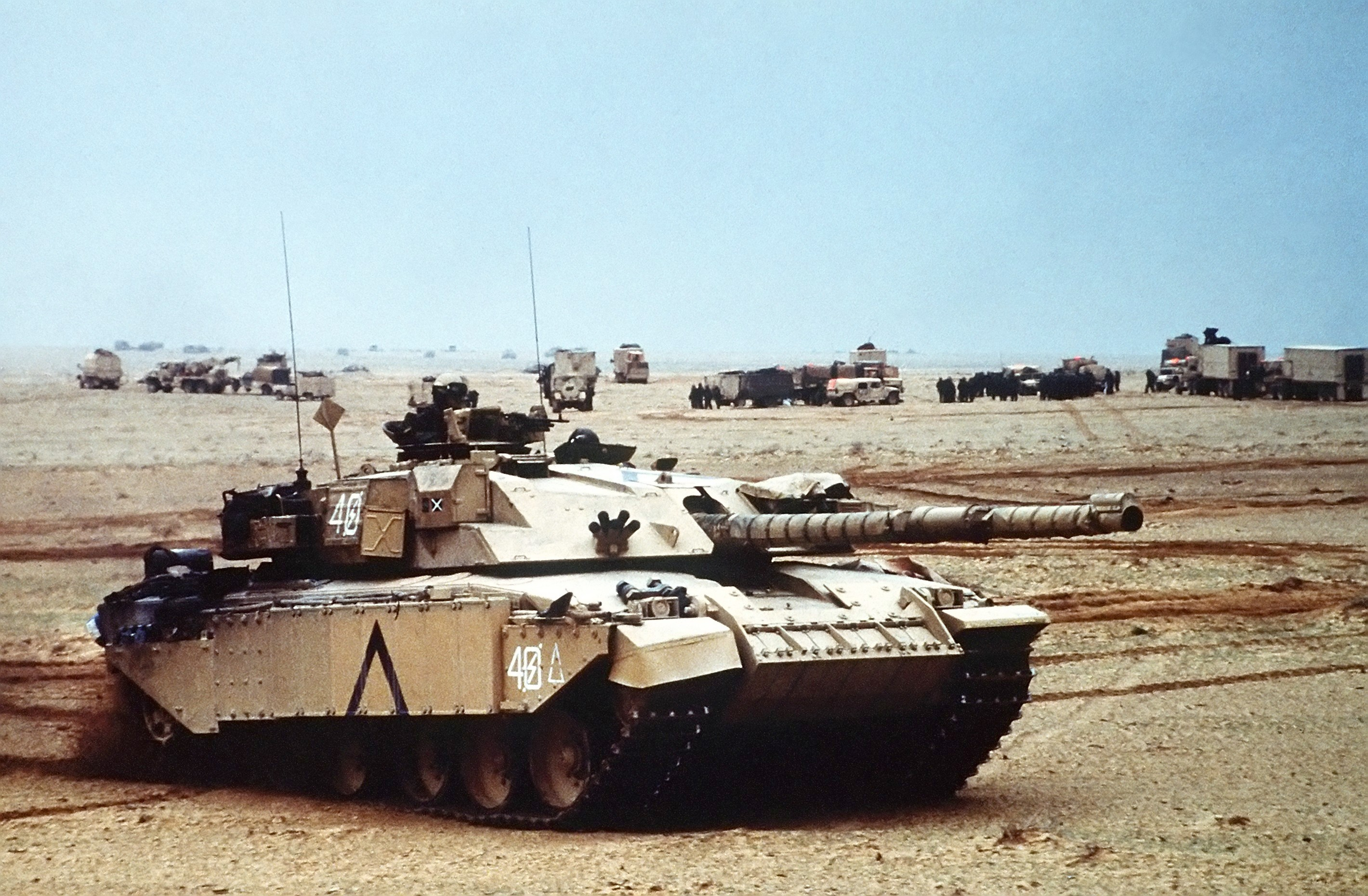
A British Army Challenger 1 main battle tank during Operation Desert Storm. The Challenger proved to be very effective at the Battle of Norfolk. Not a single Challenger was lost in battle and a Challenger set a record for the longest tank on tank kill at around 3 miles.

The British 1st Armoured Division was responsible for protecting the right flank of VII Corps. It was assumed by the Corps' planners the Iraqi 52nd Armored Division would counterattack VII Corps once their penetration into Iraqi defenses was discovered. The British 1st Armoured Division had two brigades (the 4th and 7th) which participated in Operation Granby, the name given to the British military operations during the 1991 Gulf War.

The 1st Armoured was equipped with the Challenger 1 main battle tank. The British 1st Armoured Division fielded approximately 176 Challenger 1 tanks. With a 120mm rifled main gun, thermal optics, and state of the art Chobham armor, its only rival in-theatre was the American M1A1 Abrams tank. British infantry rode into battle on the Warrior tracked armoured vehicle. It had reasonable armour protection and a 30mm gun. Modified versions of the vehicle included mortar carriers, MILAN antitank systems, and command and control vehicles.

The British also possessed a variety of excellent light armoured vehicles built on their FV101 Scorpion chassis. British artillery was primarily American made M109 howitzers (155mm), M110 howitzers (203mm), and M270 MLRS which were compatible with American systems. Their air support consisted of Gazelle helicopters, used for reconnaissance, and the Lynx helicopter which was comparable to the American AH-1 Cobra. The British had their full contingent of engineer, logistics, and medical units.

This small but powerful division was commanded by 47-year-old Maj. General Rupert Smith. He was a member of the British Parachute Regiment and an expert on Soviet armour and tank tactics. The 4th Brigade was reinforced with extra engineers and artillery. The 4th Brigade was used for breakout operations and to clear the ground at the breach. The armour-heavy 7th Brigade was used for tank on tank engagements.

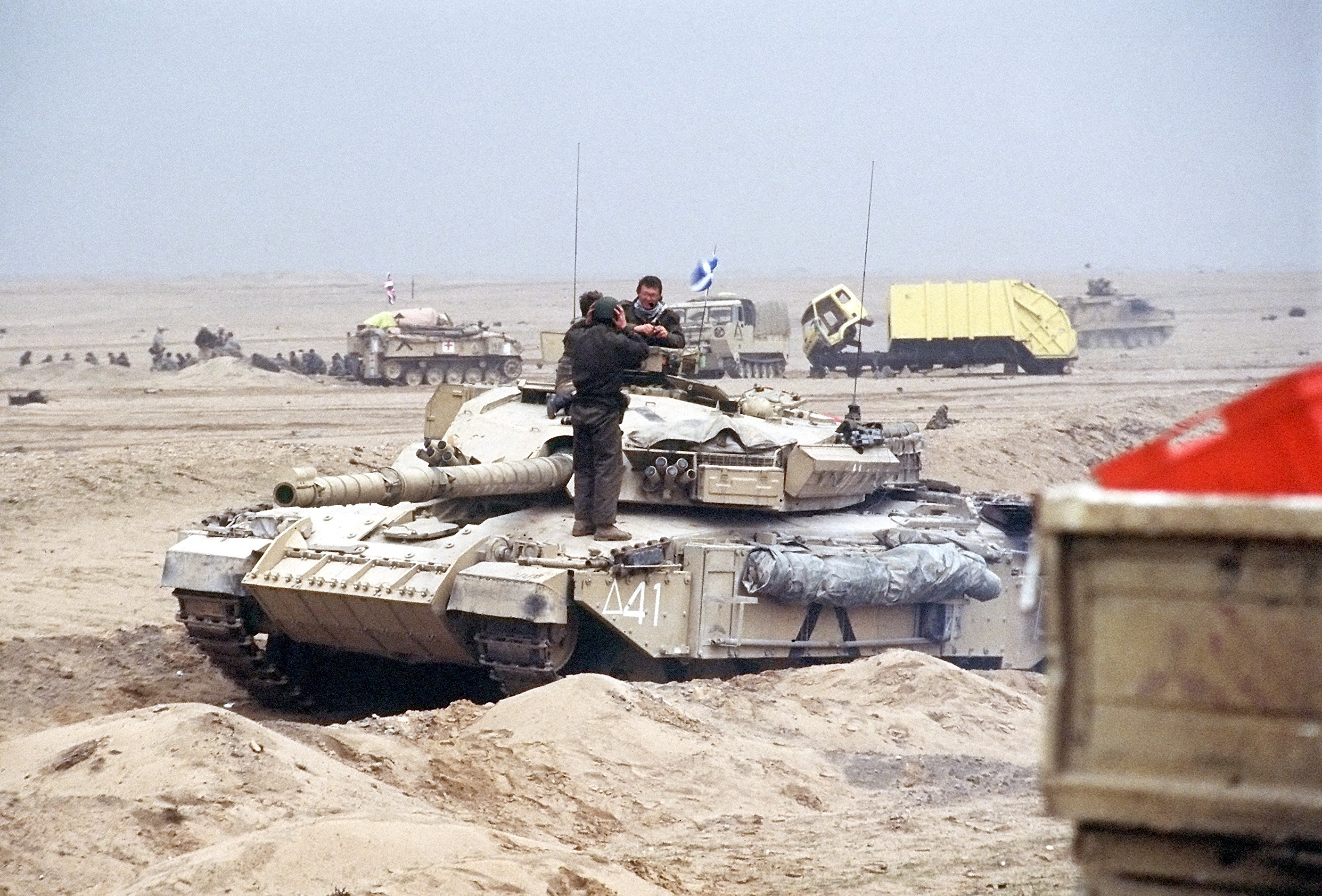
A Challenger 1 of the Royal Scots Dragoon Guards near Kuwait City during the Gulf War.

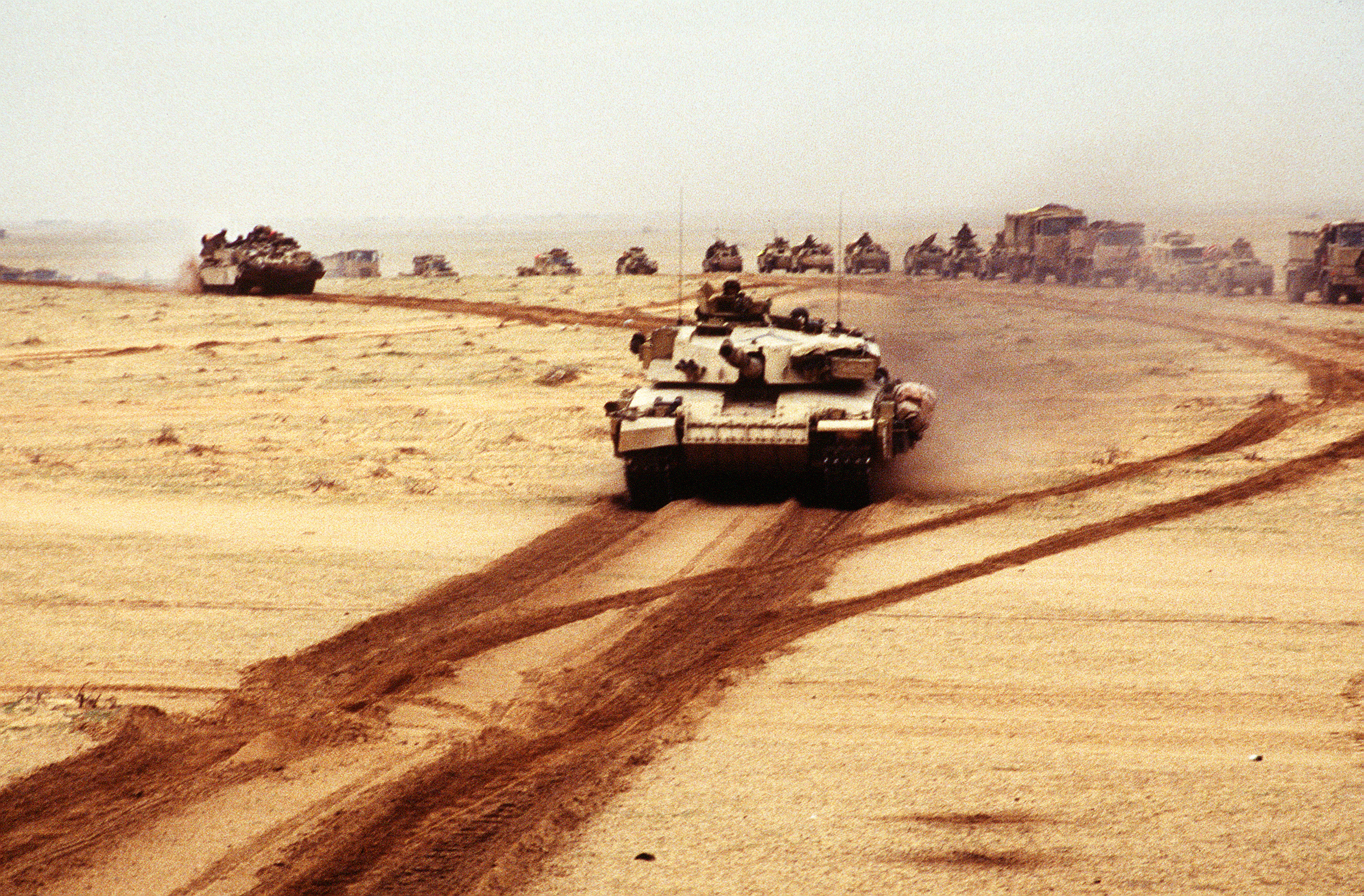
A British Challenger 1 tank during the 1st Gulf War. The British Challenger tank was the most efficient tank of the Gulf war suffering no losses while destroying approximately 300 Iraqi tanks during combat operations.

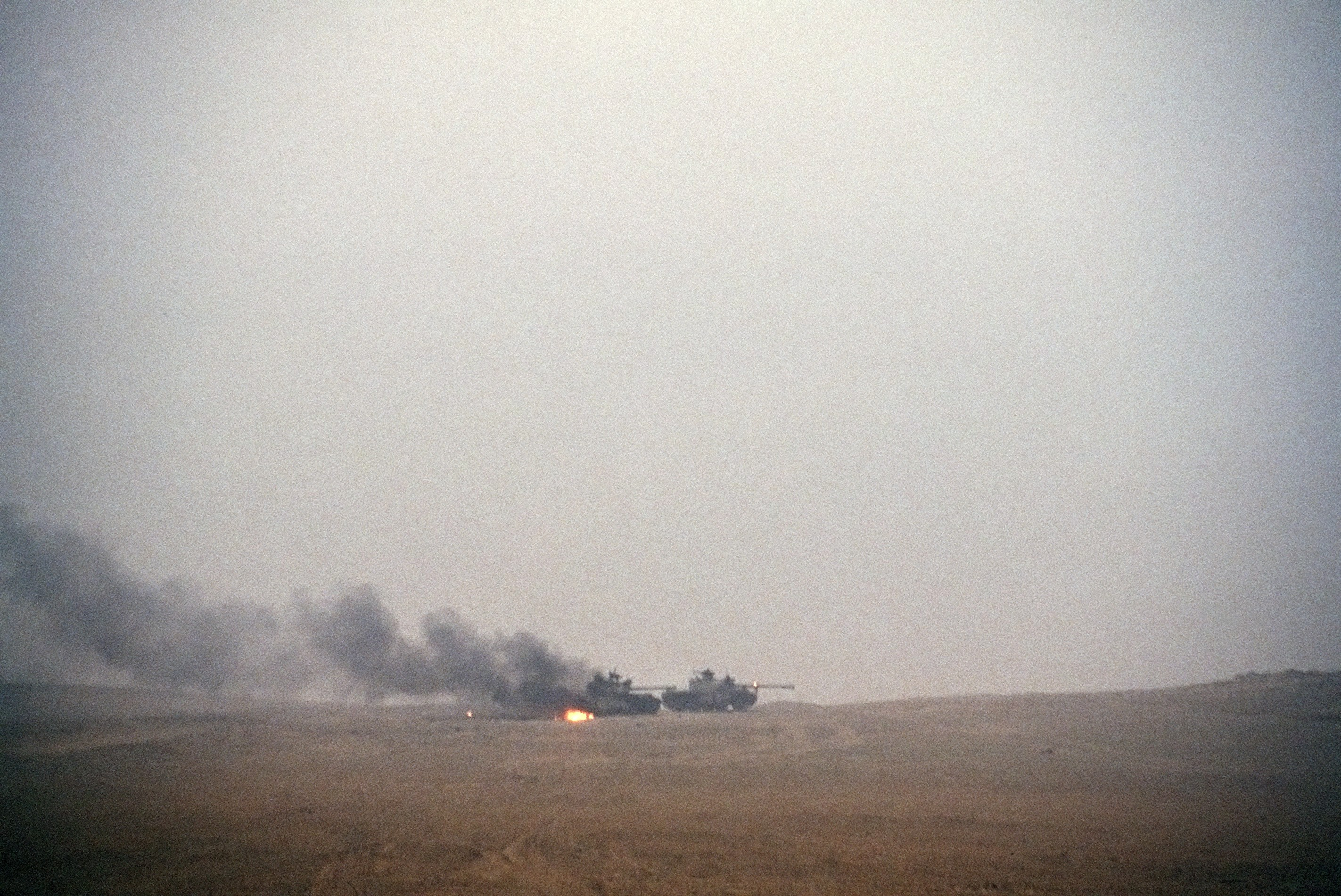
Iraqi Type 69 tanks after an attack by the British 1st Armoured Division during Operation Desert Storm.

On 25 February 1991 the 1st Armoured Division broke into the western flank of the Iraqi 48th Infantry Division which was commanded by Brigadier General Saheb Mohammed Alaw. That night the 48th Infantry Division was destroyed and General Alaw was captured by the British. That same night the British cleared two lines of enemy positions during close combat engagements. The British also destroyed several Iraqi companies of T-55 tanks. That same night other elements of the division were engaging the Iraqi 31st Infantry Division.

On 26 February 1991 British artillery units unleashed an hour-long artillery strike on Iraqi positions. It was the greatest British artillery display since World War II. That same night the British 7th Brigade fought a night tank battle against an Iraqi tank battalion from the Iraqi 52nd Armored Division. After ninety minutes of battle over 50 Iraqi tanks and armoured personnel carriers were destroyed. That same night the British 4th Brigade destroyed a headquarters and artillery site belonging to the 807th Brigade of the Iraqi 48th Infantry Division. British infantry units cleared Iraqi defensive positions which were occupied by the Iraqi 803rd Infantry Brigade.

After 48 hours of combat the British 1st Armoured Division destroyed or isolated four Iraqi infantry divisions (the 26th, 48th, 31st, and 25th) and overran the Iraqi 52nd Armored Division in several sharp engagements. The Iraqi 80th Armored Brigade would also fall victim to the British 1st Armoured Division. For several hours the 4th Brigade was involved in a battle against a battalion of dug in Iraqi soldiers and T-55 tanks.

A Challenger 1 from the Royal Scots Dragoon Guards destroyed an Iraqi tank at a range of 5,000 metres (3.1 mi). This was the longest recorded tank to tank kill in the history of armored warfare.

The British 7th Brigade cleared Objective Platinum destroying at least six additional T-55 tanks in dug in positions and a bunker using Milan missiles.

The 4th Brigade seized Objective Steel defeating the Iraqi 103rd Brigade, 25th Infantry Division in the process. As the British 4th Brigade advanced they destroyed additional Iraqi guns and fighting positions. The British lost two Warrior combat vehicles to friendly fire in the process.

British ground forces had defeated Iraqi forces during combat engagements at Objectives Copper, Zinc, Bronze, and Steel. During combat operations at Objective Zinc the British destroyed 50 enemy tanks, destroyed 50 combat vehicles, and captured 1,850 Iraqi soldiers.

British forces destroyed a communications site and two artillery positions en route to Objective Bronze. British forces also destroyed 12 Iraqi tanks, 11 guns, and 20 light armor and thin skin vehicles while clearing Objective Bronze. Elements of several Iraqi infantry brigades would also be destroyed at Objective Bronze.

The British 4th Brigade destroyed an entire tank battle group which included 25 main battle tanks at Objective Copper South. The 4th Brigade also cleared Copper South of Iraqi soldiers, IFVs, artillery, logistics support vehicles, and captured two division commanders.

The British 26 Field Artillery Regiment conducted fire missions against a tank heavy unit at Objective Brass. This included the destruction of 48 tanks, APCs, and 25 MT-LBs all hidden in fighting positions. An artillery position was also present and destroyed. The entire enemy position was destroyed and British infantry cleared the trench lines of Iraqi soldiers.

British forces destroyed another 25 tanks and 20 APCs at position Brass 3.

While taking Objective Platinum 2 the British destroyed an Iraqi tank company in the process.

Later in the day the 1st Battalion, Staffordshire Regiment, 7th Brigade engaged Iraqi forces at Objective Lead. The 1st Battalion, Staffordshire Regiment destroyed over 40 Iraqi tanks and numerous other combat systems. The British forces also captured over 800 Iraqi soldiers including the Iraqi 52nd Armored Division commander while destroying additional Iraqi infantry units.

The British also destroyed several companies of Iraqi T-55 tanks and MT-LBs at the Iraqi 52nd Armored Division's headquarters.

In the process of moving to Phase Line Smash the British forces took artillery and anti tank fire from Iraqi forces. The Iraqis failed to inflict any casualties on the British forces.

On 27 February 1991 a joint British and American artillery fire mission destroyed what was left of Iraqi artillery and infantry forces at Objective Tungsten. Approximately 70 Iraqi artillery pieces were destroyed.

The British also took Objective Waterloo. In the process the British destroyed approximately five Iraqi divisions in 48 hours of combat.

The British 1st Armoured Division secured the final objectives on the Basra Highway north of Multa Ridge.

In the final operation the British 7th Brigade took Objective Cobalt while the 4th Brigade halted farther west.

The British 1st Armoured Division had traveled 217 miles in 97 hours. The British 1st Armored Division had captured or destroyed about 300 tanks and other combat vehicles and a very large number of armored personnel carriers, trucks, reconnaissance vehicles, etc. The Desert Rats destroyed multiple Iraqi artillery positions.

The division took over 7,000 Iraqi prisoners of war, including two division commanders and two other general officers. British forces did not lose a single Challenger 1 tank during combat operations. The British suffered 15 soldiers killed and another 43 soldiers wounded during combat operations. The British also lost 2 Warrior APCs in a friendly fire incident.

== Objective Dorset ==
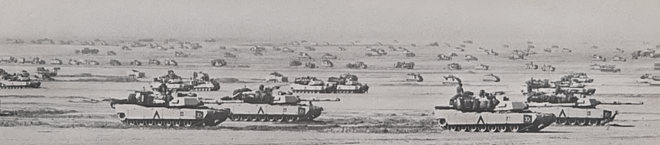
US M1A1 Abrams tanks from the 3rd Armored Division along the Line of Departure. The 3rd Armored Division inflicted heavy casualties on Iraqi forces. The 3rd Brigade alone destroyed 300 Iraqi combat vehicles of various types.

On 26 February the U.S. 3rd Armored Division was tasked with clearing Objective Dorset which was well defended by Iraqi forces. The 3rd Armored Division was already responsible for the destruction of 76 Iraqi tanks and 84 infantry fighting vehicles during the Battle of 73 Easting. The Iraqi Tawakalna Republican Guard division had a significant presence at Objective Dorset. The 50th Armored Brigade was the first unit the 3rd Armored Division encountered during the operation.

The Iraqi defenses in this sector also consisted of three mechanized battalions from the 29th Armored Brigade and two armored and one mechanized battalion from the 9th Armored Brigade. The 46th Mechanized Brigade of the 12th Armored Division was also present. A T-62 tank battalion from the 10th Armored Division was also attached to the Tawakalna Republican Guard Division. This added up to approximately eight Iraqi heavy battalions occupying Objective Dorset.

In the space of only 270 square kilometers the Iraqis massed over 122 tanks, 78 BMPs, and hundreds of other combat vehicles and fighting systems. All fell victim to the 3rd Armored Division. On 26 February 3rd Armored Division Artillery conducted fire missions against Iraqi targets including trucks, a mortar position, and a series of bunker complexes. An Iraqi artillery position was also destroyed.

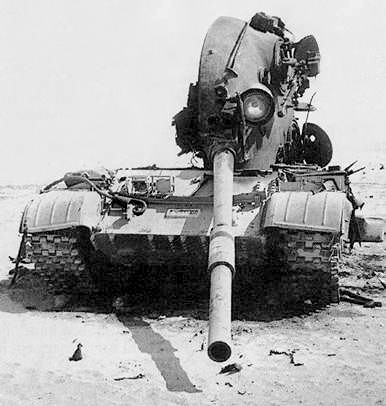
An Iraqi T-62 knocked out by 3rd Armored Division fire

Initially thousands of Iraqi infantrymen engaged the U.S. 3rd Armored Division with Sagger antitank missiles and RPGs from dug in defensive fighting positions. The Iraqi defensive network also consisted of bunkers and dug in vehicles. The Iraqis also had the support of a dozen field artillery batteries directly behind the rear of the Tawakalna Republican Guard Division. There were no soft or exposed Iraqi flanks to exploit. The 3rd Armored Division overcame these Iraqi defensive positions utilizing superior command and control along with well coordinated combined arms tactics. On 27 February 3rd Armored Division Artillery conducted 42 fire missions, and fired 827 rounds at Iraqi targets. The 3rd Armored Division Artillery fired 2,854 rounds and its MLRS units fired 555 rockets during combat operations. U.S. A-10 attack aircraft and Apache helicopters also conducted operations against Iraqi targets.

By late 27 February the U.S. 3rd Armored Division cleared Objective Dorset after meeting stiff resistance and destroying more than 300 enemy vehicles. The 3rd Brigade, 3rd Armored Division also captured 2,500 enemy prisoners. The 3rd Brigade, 3rd Armored Division actions contributed greatly to the destruction of two Iraqi Republican Guard Divisions. In 24 hours of nearly continuous combat, the Brigade destroyed or captured 547 vehicles, including 102 tanks, 81 armored personnel carriers, 34 artillery pieces, 15 AAA guns and captured hundreds of tons of supplies and 528 prisoners of war.

The 3rd Armored Division had three M1A1 Abrams tanks damaged during combat operations. The 3rd Armored Division suffered 15 soldiers killed between December 1990 and late February 1991. Approximately 7 of the soldiers were killed in action. Another 27 soldiers from the division were wounded in action during combat operations.

== Aftermath ==
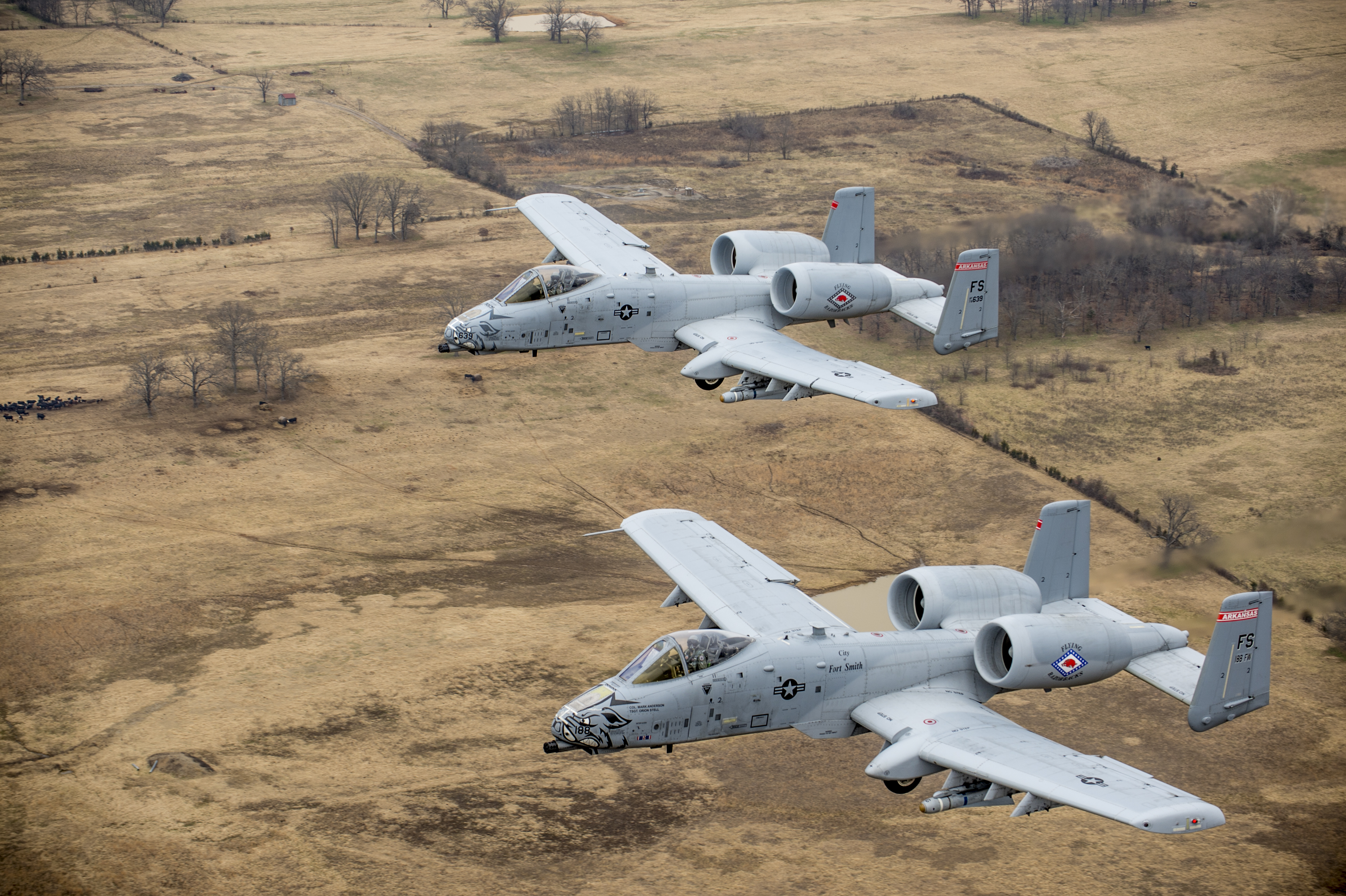
U.S. A-10 attack aircraft units distinguished themselves during combat operations.

By the end of combat operations on 28 February 1991, VII Corps had driven 260 kilometers, captured 22,000 Iraqi soldiers, and destroyed 1,350 Iraqi tanks, 1,224 armored personnel carriers, 285 artillery pieces, 105 air defense systems, and 1,229 trucks.

The U.S. Fairchild Republic A-10 Thunderbolt II ground attack aircraft would distinguish itself during the Gulf War. It wreaked havoc on Iraqi ground forces. U.S. A-10 "Warthog" crews would destroy 900 Iraqi tanks, 2,000 other military vehicles and 1,200 artillery pieces during combat operations.

VII Corps suffered 62 killed and 235 wounded. It also suffered 18 M1A1 tanks destroyed or damaged, 14 Bradley Fighting Vehicles were destroyed and 9 damaged, 2 helicopters were destroyed and 3 damaged, and 9 other vehicles of various types were destroyed or damaged during combat operations.

== Historical significance ==
Current sources consider it the largest tank battle of the Gulf War. Some sources list the Battle of Norfolk as the second largest tank battle in American history behind the Battle of the Bulge.

== See also ==
- Battle of Medina Ridge
- History of the M1 Abrams
