= 12th Division (Iraq) =

Defunct Iraqi Army formation

- Active: 1959–2003; 2008–2014
- Country: Ba'athist Iraq (1968–2003); Iraq (2003–present)
- Branch: Iraqi Army
- Type: Light infantry
- Size: Division
- Part of: Iraqi Ground Forces Command
- Engagements: Gulf War; Iraq War

The 12th Light Infantry Division was a formation of the Iraqi Army. It dissolved under ISIS pressure during the Northern Iraq offensive (June 2014) and was not reformed.

The 12th Division was originally activated in the 1970s or 1980s, and probably disbanded after 1991 (it was not listed in a Jane's Intelligence Review survey of September 1997). It was an armoured division during the 1991 Persian Gulf War. It was part of the armoured reserves in the rear of the Kuwaiti theatre, as part of the Jihad Corps alongside the 10th Armoured Division. U.S. Army analysts believed the two divisions retained an average "combat effectiveness percentage" of 59%. Among the division's brigades was the 50th Armoured Brigade, under the command of Colonel Mohammed Ashad.

After the ground offensive began, the U.S. 1st Infantry Division (Mechanized) and the 2nd Armored Cavalry Regiment destroyed most of the division, destroying no less than 80 combat vehicles. Other elements of the division were destroyed by British forces during the Battle of Norfolk.

== After 2003 invasion of Iraq ==
The 12th Division was planned to be established in July 2008 by doubling the 4th Division. Its home base was planned to be at Tikrit and take into account the province of Salah ad-Din Governorate. It was to be initially made up of three trained strategic infrastructure brigades and was to receive the 4th Brigade, 4th Division. A new 4th Brigade was to have been formed for the 4th Division from effective excess staff from the other three brigades of the division.

Division Units:

- Headquarters and Service Company
- 46th Motorised Brigade (ex-1st Strategic Infrastructure Brigade)
- 47th Motorised Brigade (ex-2nd Strategic Infrastructure Brigade)
- 48th Brigade (ex-9th Strategic Infrastructure Brigade)
- 49th Brigade (ex-4-4)
- 12th Motorized Transportation Regiment

The 49th Brigade, former 4th Brigade of the 4th Division, the more operational brigade of 12th Division was in Baghdad, fighting in the battles of Sadr City in July 2008.

The 48th Brigade is now part of the 4th Division.

Circa 2009 the 12th Division was located in Tikrit.

As July 2010, the division's units were its Headquarters and Service Company; the 15th (Eagles) Brigade (from 4th Division); the 46th Motorised Brigade (ex-1st Strategic Infrastructure Brigade); the 47th Motorised Brigade (ex-2nd Strategic Infrastructure Brigade); the 49th Brigade (ex-4-4); and the 12th Motorized Transportation Regiment.

The division dissolved under pressure during the Northern Iraq offensive (June 2014) and was not reformed.

== Works Consulted ==
- Bourque, Stephen A. (2001). Jayhawk! The 7th Corps in the Persian Gulf War. Center of Military History, United States Army. LCCN 2001028533. OCLC 51313637.
