= 10th Division (Iraq) =

- Active: 1959–2003; 2007–present
- Country: Republic of Iraq (1959–1968); Ba'athist Iraq (1968–2003); Iraq (2007–present)
- Allegiance: Iraq
- Branch: Iraqi Army
- Type: Armoured
- Size: Division
- Part of: Iraqi Ground Forces Command
- Equipment: T-90; T-72
- Engagements: Iran–Iraq War; First Battle of Khorramshahr; Operation Dezful; Operation Tariq al-Qods; Operation Jerusalem; Operation Ramadan; First Battle of al-Faw; Gulf War; Battle of Khafji; Iraq War; Operation Phantom Thunder; Battle of Baqubah

The 10th Division is a formation of the Iraqi Army that was dissolved in 2003, but reinstated in 2007.

== History ==
The 10th Armoured Division served in the Iran–Iraq War. It participated in the initial liberation of the Iraqi border enclaves which had been occupied for years by Iran. Its 24th Mechanized Brigade was tasked with seizing the Saif Sa'ad enclave, located halfway between Mehran and Naft-e-Shah (northeast of Tursaq). The division commander received his orders on 8 September 1980, and the operation was under way by 10 September. The northern part of the enclave was seized by 13 September, and the southern part several days later. Later in the war, the division suffered heavy losses in Operation Fath ol-Mobin. It also fought in Operation Ramadan and Operation Jerusalem.

The division fought in the 1991 Gulf War with Jihad Forces (corps). It was considered the best regular division in the Iraqi Army. It had more modern equipment than the other regular Iraqi formations, being equipped with T-72 and T-62 tanks. It engaged American and British forces during the Battle of Norfolk. The U.S. 3rd Armored Division engaged an Iraqi 10th Armoured Division T-62 tank battalion that was assigned to the Republican Guard Tawakalna Division at the battle for Objective Dorset.

In September 1997 a Jane's Intelligence Review article listed the 10th Armoured Division as being part of the 4th Corps, located at Al Teab in Al Amarah Governorate (sic: Maysan Governorate), and consisting of the 17th, 24th, and 42nd Brigades. The division began the 2003 invasion of Iraq under the command of the 4th Corps on the Iranian border north of Al Amarah.

The division and the remainder of Saddam Hussein's Iraqi Army was dissolved by Coalition Provisional Authority Order 2 of May 2003. However, by mid-2007 the division was active again; a Freedom of Information request answered by the UK Permanent Joint Headquarters stated on 23 May 2007 that "..The 10th Division (10 Div) are responsible for the four southern Iraqi provinces with one Brigade taking responsibility for each Dhi Qar, Maysan and al-Muthanna provinces and two brigades (1 and 5) responsible for Basra. The 5th Brigade is not yet fully stood up, but is recruiting and training. This is expected to be completed before the end of the year."

The division was then involved in the Battle of Basra (2008), also known as Operation "Charge of the Knights."

During the 4th Brigade Combat Team, 1st Cavalry Division's tour from June 2008-mid-2009, the division conducted Operation "Lion's Roar," a combined live-fire exercise in Maysan Province in April 2009 – the first of its kind in the Iraqi Army. The exercise integrated U.S. enablers and demonstrated the capability and lethality of the Iraqi Army.

On 29 August 2015, Brigadier General Mahmoud al-Filahi was appointed as the commander of the division, after the former commander, Brigadier General Safin Abdulmajid, was killed by a suicide car bomber in Ramadi.

In November 2014, the former 1st Division's 4th Brigade was reported to be now part of the 10th Division, operating south of Baghdad.
